= Tokyo city district =

Legislative district of Japan

Tokyo Tokyo city district (東京府東京市区, Tōkyō-fu-Tōkyō-shi-ku) was a constituency of the House of Representatives in the Imperial Diet of Japan (national legislature). Between 1902 and 1917 it elected eleven representatives by single non-transferable vote (SNTV). It was located in Tokyo and consisted of Tokyo City. Tokyo city often elected (anti-mainstream) Kenseitō, Kokumintō, Dōshikai and independent politicians while few Seiyūkai politicians (compared to the party's nationwide position) managed to be elected among the top five. Exceptions were Hatoyama Kazuo and his son Ichirō who in 1917 managed to achieve top tōsen, i.e. be elected with the highest vote. Other prominent representatives from the city of Tokyo include economist Taguchi Ukichi, Bukichi Miki, Kenseikai secretary-general in the 1920s and co-founder of Hatoyama's postwar Japan Democratic Party in 1954, and Tanomogi Keikichi, Minister of Communication in the 1930s and mayor of Tokyo.

In 1900 a change of the electoral law brought the transition to SNTV multi-member districts, the introduction of secret balloting and a reduction of the census requirement for suffrage. With the return to single-member districts in the election of 1920, Tokyo's wards were split up into 11 electoral districts.

== Elected representatives ==
election year	highest vote (top tōsen)	2nd	3rd	4th	5th	6th	7th	8th	9th	10th	11th
1902	Ōhashi Shintarō (Jin’inkai)	Hatoyama Kazuo (Kensei Hontō)	Hitosugi Hide (Jin’inkai)	Tsunoda Shimpei (Kensei Hontō)	Akiyama Teisuke	Ōishi Kumakichi (Kensei Hontō)	Isobe Shirō (Rikken Seiyūkai)	Kurizuka Seigo (Rikken Seiyūkai)	Nakahachi Yoshiaki (?) (Rikken Seiyūkai)	Asakura Tomoo (??)	Taguchi Ukichi
1903	Iwaya Matsuhei	Akiyama Teisuke	Taguchi Ukichi	Ebara Soroku (Rikken Seiyūkai)	Miwa Shinjirō	Hatoyama Kazuo (Kensei Hontō)	Maruyama Namasa	Tsunoda Shimpei (Kensei Hontō)	Isobe Shirō (Rikken Seiyūkai)	Kurizuka Seigo (Rikken Seiyūkai)	Takanashi Tetsushirō (Chūsei Club)
1904	Ōishi Kumakichi (Kensei Hontō)	Hatoyama Kazuo (Kensei Hontō)	Miwa Shinjirō	Akiyama Teisuke	Seki Naohiko (Kensei Hontō)	Taguchi Ukichi	Tsunoda Shimpei (Kensei Hontō)	Ebara Soroku (Rikken Seiyūkai)	Kurizuka Seigo (Rikken Seiyūkai)	Takanashi Tetsushirō (Kōshin Club)	Fukuchi Gen’ichirō
1908	Takagi Masutarō	Kurahara Korehiro (Yūkōkai)	Hatoyama Kazuo (Rikken Seiyūkai)	Nakano Takenaka	Ema Shun’ichi	Inamoto Saburō	Yamane Masatsugu (Daidō Club)	Matsushita Gunji (Daidō Club)	Miwa Shinjirō (Yūkōkai)	Seki Naohiko (Kensei Hontō)	Watanabe Kanjūrō (Rikken Seiyūkai)
1912	Takagi Masutarō (Rikken Kokumintō)	Kurahara Korehiro (Rikken Kokumintō)	Suzuki Umeshirō	Nakajima Yukitaka (Rikken Kokumintō)	Hoshino Shaku	Kurosu Ryūtarō (Rikken Kokumintō)	Seki Naohiko (Rikken Kokumintō)	Miwa Shinjirō	Kojima Kazuo (Rikken Kokumintō)	Inamoto Saburō	Matsushita Gunji (Chūō Club)
1915	Kojima Kazuo (Rikken Kokumintō)	Tanomogi Keikichi (Rikken Dōshikai)	Imai Kihachi (Rikken Dōshikai)	Takagi Masutarō (Rikken Kokumintō)	Seki Naohiko (Rikken Kokumintō)	Hatoyama Ichirō (Rikken Seiyūkai)	Ema Shun’ichi (Rikken Dōshikai)	Akiyama Teisuke (Rikken Dōshikai)	Suzuki Umeshirō (Rikken Kokumintō)	Suzuki Manjirō (Rikken Dōshikai)	Kurosu Ryūtarō (Rikken Dōshikai)
1917	Hatoyama Ichirō (Rikken Seiyūkai)	Suzuki Umeshirō (Rikken Kokumintō)	Takagi Masutarō (Rikken Kokumintō)	Kurosu Ryūtarō (Kenseikai)	Kanesugi Eigorō	Seki Naohiko (Rikken Kokumintō)	Yokoyama Katsutarō (Kenseikai)	Isobe Hisashi (Rikken Seiyūkai)	Miki Bukichi (Kenseikai)	Tanomogi Keikichi (Kenseikai)	Kojima Kazuo (Rikken Kokumintō)
