= Tokyo counties district =

Former electoral district

The Tokyo counties district (東京府郡部区, Tōkyō-fu gun-bu ku) was an electoral district for the House of Representatives in the Imperial Diet of Japan. Between 1902 and 1917, it eletected five representatives by single non-transferable vote. It was located in Tokyo and consisted of all counties (gun) of the prefecture and the Izu and Ogasawara islands, in other words all parts of Tokyo that did not belong to Tokyo city. The counties were: Ebara County, Toyotama County, Kita-Toshima County, Minami-Adachi County, Minami-Katsushika County, Kita-Tama County, Minami-Tama County and Nishi-Tama County; the island communities hadn't yet been organized into modern municipalities (the villages in the present-day town of Ōshima, Tokyo were set up 1908, while, for example, the village of Iōjima, Tokyo – now part of Ogasawara – on Iwo Jima was only created in 1923).

Unlike the Tokyo city constituency, the Seiyūkai's position in the still mostly rural Tokyo counties district was strong and it managed to win four of the five seats several times even though anti-mainstream candidate Takagi Masatoshi achieved to be elected with the highest vote (top tōsen) four times in a row. Takagi, a blind Shinagawa native, had been a member of the prefectural parliament from 1881 and had already been elected to the first Diet in 1890 where he opposed the Meiji government's military expenditures – as did initially most representatives from the former Freedom and People's Rights Movement before the Seiyūkai was formed. Another representative for the counties district, first elected in 1917, was Maeda Yonezō who went on to become co-president of the Seiyūkai in the 1930s alongside Hatoyama Ichirō, Shimada Toshio and Nakajima Chikuhei.

With the return to "small" single- and two-member districts in the 1920 general election, Tokyo's counties and Hachiōji that was elevated from town to city in 1917 were divided into five electoral districts.

== Elected representatives ==
| election year | highest vote (top tōsen) | 2nd | 3rd | 4th | 5th |
|---|---|---|---|---|---|
| 1902 | Murano Tsuneemon (Seiyukai) | Sekine Ryūsuke (Seiyukai) | Hiruma Kuninosuke (Seiyukai) | Hotta Rentarō (Kensei Hontō) | Urushi Shōgan (Seiyukai) |
| 1903 | Murano Tsuneemon (Seiyukai) | Urushi Shōgan (Seiyukai) | Sekine Ryūsuke (Seiyukai) | Hotta Rentarō (Kensei Hontō) | Asaka Katsutaka (?) (Kensei Hontō) |
| 1904 | Morikubo Sakuzō (Seiyukai) | Murano Tsuneemon (Seiyukai) | Urushi Shōgan (Seiyukai) | Sekine Ryūsuke (Seiyukai) | Hotta Rentarō (Kensei Hontō) |
| 1908 | Takagi Masatoshi (Yūkōkai) | Urushi Shōgan (Seiyukai) | Okazaki Kunisuke (Seiyukai) | Morikubo Sakuzō (Seiyukai) | Murano Tsuneemon (Seiyukai) |
| 1912 | Takagi Masatoshi (Kokumintō) | Morikubo Sakuzō (Seiyukai) | Mochizuki Unai (Seiyukai) | Urushi Shōgan (Seiyukai) | Murano Tsuneemon (Seiyukai) |
| 1915 | Takagi Masatoshi (Ōkuma Hakukōenkai) | Moriya Konosuke (Dōshikai) | Akimoto Kishichi (Seiyukai) | Morikubo Sakuzō (Seiyukai) | Murano Tsuneemon (Seiyukai) |
| 1917 | Takagi Masatoshi (Kenseikai) | Akimoto Kishichi (Seiyukai) | Maeda Yonezō (Seiyukai) | Murano Tsuneemon (Seiyukai) | Urushi Shōgan (Seiyukai) |
