= Ōishi Masami =

Japanese politician (1855–1935)

Senior Third Rank Ōishi Masami
- 大石 正巳
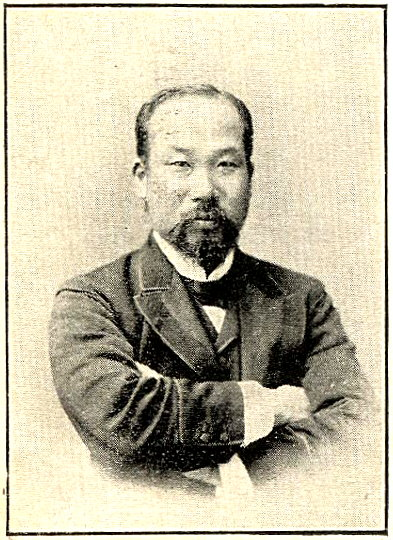

Minister of Agriculture and Commerce
- In office 30 June 1898 – 8 November 1898
- Prime Minister: Ōkuma Shigenobu
- Preceded by: Kaneko Kentarō
- Succeeded by: Sone Arasuke

Member of the House of Representatives
- In office 10 August 1898 – 25 December 1914
- Preceded by: Yatsuchi Kazuyuki
- Succeeded by: Ishimoto Kantaro
- Constituency: Mie 4th (1898–1902); Mie Counties (1902–1903); Kōchi Counties (1903–1914)

Personal details
- Born: 26 May 1855 Tosa Province, Japan
- Died: 12 July 1935 (aged 80)
- Resting place: Aoyama Cemetery
- Party: Rikken Dōshikai (1913–1915)
- Other political affiliations: Liberal (1881–1882); Shimpotō (1896–1898); Kensei Hontō (1898–1910); Rikken Kokumintō (1910–1913)

Ōishi Masami (大石 正巳; 26 May 1855 – 12 July 1935) was a politician and cabinet minister in the pre-war Empire of Japan.

== Biography ==
Ōishi was a native of Tosa Province (modern-day Kōchi Prefecture), where his father was a samurai in the service of Tosa Domain. In 1873, he joined with Itagaki Taisuke and became an important member of the Freedom and People's Rights Movement. He became one of the leaders of the Jiyūtō political party in 1881. However, he had a falling out with Itagaki in 1882 and left the party. He subsequently joined with Gotō Shōjirō’s daidō danketsu (coalition) movement in 1887. In 1892, he was appointed to the Japanese legation in Seoul, Korea. He was back in Japan by 1896, and was one of the founding members of the Shimpotō political party. Under the short-lived 1st Ōkuma Shigenobu administration in 1898, Oishi was appointed Minister of Agriculture and Commerce.

Ōishi later joined the Rikken Kokumintō and was at one point a contender against Inukai Tsuyoshi for its leadership. In 1913, he broke with Inukai, and joined Katsura Tarō’s new Rikken Dōshikai, where he was ranked as one of its five leaders. He retired from politics in 1915, after having been elected to the Lower House of the Diet of Japan for six terms.

Political offices
Preceded by Kaneko Kentarō	Minister of Agriculture & Commerce; 30 June – 8 November 1898	Succeeded by Sone Arasuke
