= Boshin Club =

Former political party in Japan

The Boshin Club was a political party in Japan.

== History ==
The party was established in December 1908 during a period in which several anti-Rikken Seiyūkai groups began to coalesce in reaction to Rikken Seiyūkai's victory in the 1908 elections. Its 42 MPs were involved in commerce and industry and many had been elected as independents,while some were defectors from other parties: Matsuo Torazō (Seiyūkai-Shimonoseki), Īda Seiichi (Seiyūkai-Yamaguchi Prefecture), Kaji Suekichi (Daidō Club-Marugame) and Ishida Heikichi (Yūkōkai-Moji).

In March 1910 the party was dissolved when around half its members joined with several independent MPs and the Daidō Club to form the Chūō Club, whilst seven of its MPs participated in the formation of Rikken Kokumintō.
