= Yūshinkai =

Japanese political party

The Yūshinkai (Japanese: 又新会, lit. Society for Rebirth) was a political party in Japan. It was active from 1908 through 1910.

== History ==
The party was established on 21 December 1908 by a merger of the Yūkōkai and several independent members of the National Diet. The party had few coherent policies except for anti-corruption, and co-operated with Kensei Hontō in opposing the Rikken Seiyūkai. In March 1910 over half of its 45 members left to join the new Rikken Kokumintō, and in December 1910 the party was disbanded, with its 18 remaining members sitting as independents.
