= Liberal Party (Japan, 1903) =

Political party in Japan

The Liberal Party (Japanese: 自由党, Jiyūtō) was a political party in Japan.

== History ==
The Liberal Party was established in mid-1903 as a breakaway from Rikken Seiyūkai by a group of around 20 National Diet members opposed to co-operation with Prime Minister Katsura Tarō. It sought to bring back the ideals of the original Liberal Party, but suffered from the widespread suspicion that it was a tool of Katsura's.

In December 1905 it merged with the Kōshin Club and Teikokutō to form the Daidō Club (1905–10).
