= Seiyū Club =

Seiyū Club may refer to:

- Seiyū Club (1900s), a defunct political party in Japan
- Seiyū Club (1913), a defunct political party in Japan
- Valiente Toyama, a football club known as Seiyū Club until 1999
