= Chūō Club =

Political party in Japan

Chūō Club 中央倶楽部
- Founded: March 1910
- Dissolved: February 1913
- Split from: Boshin Club; Daidō Club
- Merged into: Rikken Dōshikai

The Chūō Club (Japanese: 中央倶楽部, lit. Central Club) was a political party in Japan.

== History ==
The party was established in March 1910 by a group of around 50 MPs who had previously been members of the Boshin Club and the Daidō Club or who had sat as independents, following negotiations between the Boshin Club's Hida Kageyuki and Nakamura Yaroku and the Daidō Club's Adachi Kenzō, together with the intervention of Minister of Agriculture and Commerce Ōura Kanetake. It retained the former parties' association with the faction of the army headed by Yamagata Aritomo and Katsura Tarō.

In the 1912 elections it was reduced to 31 seats, and ceased to exist in February the following year when it merged with the reformist faction of Rikken Kokumintō to form Rikken Dōshikai.
