= Kensei Hontō =

Kensei Hontō 憲政本党
- Founded: 3 November 1898
- Dissolved: 13 March 1910
- Split from: Kenseitō
- Succeeded by: Rikken Kokumintō

Kensei Hontō (Japanese: 憲政本党 , literally "Authentic Constitutional Party") was a political party in Japan.

== History ==
The party was established on 3 November 1898 following a split in the Kenseitō. Kenseitō had been formed earlier in the year by a merger of the Liberal Party and Shimpotō, and it was former members of the latter that founded Kensei Hontō. However, 34 party members defected in 1901 over party leader Ōkuma Shigenobu's support for the 4th Itō government's efforts to raise taxes to pay for expenses incurred in the Boxer Rebellion.

In the 1902 elections it won 95 of the 376 seats, finishing second to Rikken Seiyūkai, which had been formed by a merger of the remainder of the Kenseitō, several independent National Diet members, some Teikokutō members, and nine members of Kensei Hontō, including Yukio Ozaki. It was reduced to 85 seats in the 1903 elections, at which point it allied with Rikken Seiyūkai to oppose the first Katsura Tarō government. It gained five seats in the 1904 elections.

In 1907, Ōkuma resigned as president, and in the 1908 general elections, the party was reduced to 70 seats. In March 1910 it merged with the Mumeikei, seven National Diet members from the Boshin Club and half of the Yūshinkai to form Rikken Kokumintō.
