= Seiyū Club (1900s) =

Political party in Japan

Seiyū Club (Japanese: 政友倶楽部, lit. 'Political Friends Club') was a political party in Japan in the 1900s.

The party contested the 1903 general elections, winning 13 of the 376 seats. It did not contest any further general elections.
