= National Diet =

Bicameral national legislature of Japan

National Diet of Japan 国会 Kokkai
- 222nd Session of the National Diet

Type
- Type: Bicameral
- Houses: Senate (upper house); House of Representatives (lower house)

History
- Founded: 29 November 1890 (135 years, 347 days)

Leadership
- President of the Senate: Masakazu Sekiguchi, LDP since 11 November 2024
- Speaker of the House of Representatives: Eisuke Mori, LDP since 18 February 2026
- Prime Minister: Sanae Takaichi, LDP since 21 October 2025

Structure
- Seats: 713; 248 (Senate); 465 (House of Representatives)
- Senate political groups: Government (120): LDP (101); JIP (19); Opposition (120): CDP (39); DPFP (25); Kōmeitō (21); Sanseitō (15); JCP (7); Life (5); CPJ (2); Okinawa Whirlwind (2) (Note: Independent (2)); Team Mirai (2) (Note: Team Mirai (1); Independent (1)); SDP (2); Unaffiliated (7): LDP (1/Speaker); CDP (1/Vice Speaker); Independent (5); Vacant (1): Vacant (1)
- House of Representatives political groups: Government (351): LDP (315) (Note: LDP (314); Independent (1)); JIP (36); Opposition (107): Centrists (47) (Note: Kōmeitō (27); DRP (18); CRA (1); Independent (1)); DPFP (28); Sanseitō (15); Team Mirai (11); JCP (4); Association of Patriots (2) (Note: Independent (2)); Unaffiliated (6): Independent (6) (Note: LDP (1/Speaker); Komeito (1/Vice Speaker); Life (1); Genzei–Yukoku (1); Independent (2)); Vacant (1): Vacant (1)

Elections
- Senate voting system: Parallel voting: Single non-transferable vote (148 seats); Party-list proportional representation (100 seats); Staggered elections
- House of Representatives voting system: Parallel voting: First-past-the-post voting (289 seats); Party-list proportional representation (176 seats)
- Last Senate election: 20 July 2025
- Last House of Representatives election: 8 February 2026
- Next Senate election: 2028
- Next House of Representatives election: By 2030

Meeting place
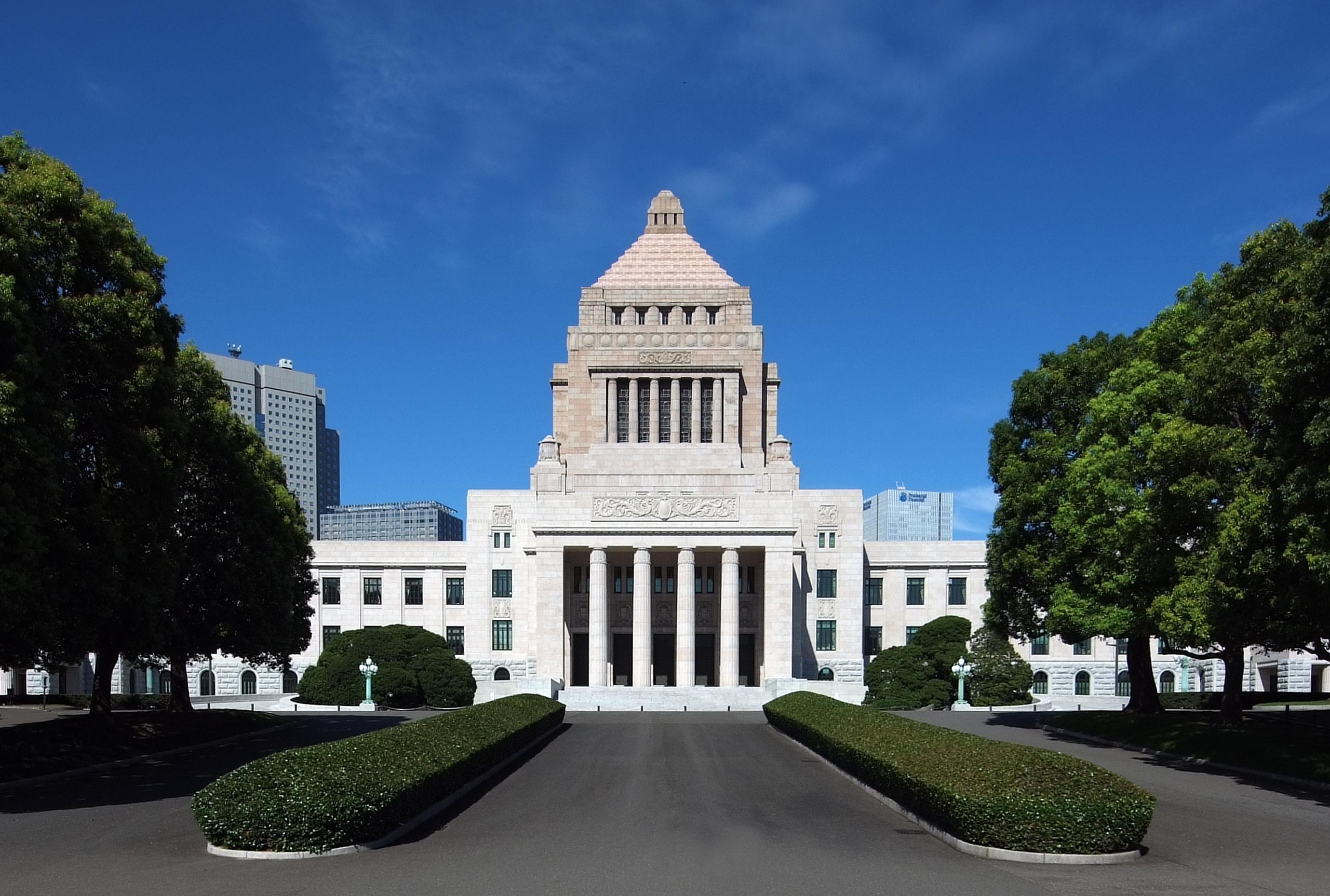
- National Diet Building, Nagatachō 1-7-1, Chiyoda District, Tokyo, Japan; 35°40′33″N 139°44′42″E

Website
- Senate – official website; House of Representatives – official website

The National Diet (Japanese: 国会, Hepburn: Kokkai; Japanese pronunciation: [kok̚.kai]) is the national legislature of Japan. It is composed of a lower house, called the House of Representatives (衆議院, Shūgiin), and an upper house, the Senate (参議院, Sangiin; formerly named the House of Councillors). Both houses are directly elected under a parallel voting system. In addition to passing laws, the Diet is formally responsible for nominating the prime minister. The Diet was first established as the Imperial Diet in 1890 under the Meiji Constitution, and took its current form in 1947 upon the adoption of the post-war constitution. Both houses meet in the National Diet Building (国会議事堂, Kokkai-gijidō) in Nagatachō, Chiyoda, Tokyo.

== Composition ==
The houses of the National Diet are both elected under parallel voting systems. This means that the seats to be filled in any given election are divided into two groups, each elected by a different method; the main difference between the houses is in the sizes of the two groups and how they are elected. Voters are asked to cast two votes: one for an individual candidate in a constituency, and one for a party list. Any national of Japan at least 18 years of age may vote in these elections, reduced from age 20 in 2016. Japan's parallel voting system (mixed-member majoritarian) is not to be confused with the mixed-member proportional systems used in many other nations. The Constitution of Japan does not specify the number of members of each house of the Diet, the voting system, or the necessary qualifications of those who may vote or be returned in parliamentary elections, thus allowing all of these things to be determined by ordinary law. However it does guarantee universal adult suffrage and a secret ballot. It also stipulates that the electoral law must not discriminate in terms of "race, creed, sex, social status, family origin, education, property or income".

The election of Diet members is controlled by statutes passed by the Diet. This is a source of contention concerning re-apportionment of prefectures' seats in response to changes of population distribution. For example, the Liberal Democratic Party (LDP) had controlled Japan for most of its post-war history, and it gained much of its support from rural areas. During the post-war era, large numbers of people relocated to urban centers for economic reasons; though some re-apportionments have been made to the number of each prefecture's assigned seats in the Diet, rural areas generally have more representation than do urban areas. Among rural interests, Japanese rice farmers historically had particular influence in internal LDP politics and national policies on trade and agricultural subsidies.

The Supreme Court of Japan began exercising judicial review of apportionment laws following the Kurokawa decision of 1976, invalidating an election in which one district in Hyōgo Prefecture received five times the representation of another district in Osaka Prefecture. In recent elections, the malapportionment ratio amounted to 3.03 in the Senate (2022 election: Kanagawa/Fukui) and 2.06 in the House of Representatives (2024 election: Hokkaidō 3/Tottori 1).

Candidates for the lower house must be 25 years old or older and 30 years or older for the upper house. All candidates must be Japanese nationals. Under Article 49 of Japan's Constitution, by law, Diet members are paid about ¥1.3 million a month in salary. Each lawmaker is entitled to employ three secretaries with taxpayer funds, and to receive free Shinkansen tickets, and four round-trip airplane tickets a month to enable them to travel back and forth to their home districts.

== Powers ==
Article 41 of the Constitution describes the National Diet as "the highest organ of State power" and "the sole law-making organ of the State". This statement is in forceful contrast to the Meiji Constitution, which described the Emperor as the one who exercised legislative power with the consent of the Diet. The Diet's responsibilities include not only the making of laws but also the approval of the annual national budget that the government submits and the ratification of treaties. It can also initiate draft constitutional amendments, which, if approved, must be presented to the people in a referendum. The Diet may conduct "investigations in relation to government" (Article 62).

The Prime Minister must be designated by Diet resolution, establishing the principle of legislative supremacy over executive government agencies (Article 67). The government can also be dissolved by the Diet if the House of Representatives passes a motion of no confidence introduced by fifty members of the House of Representatives. Government officials, including the Prime Minister and Cabinet members, are required to appear before Diet investigative committees and answer inquiries. The Diet also has the power to impeach judges convicted of criminal or irregular conduct.

In most circumstances, in order to become law a bill must be first passed by both houses of the Diet and then promulgated by the Emperor. This role of the Emperor is similar to the Royal Assent in some other nations; however, the Emperor cannot refuse to promulgate a law and therefore his legislative role is merely a formality.

The House of Representatives is the more powerful chamber of the Diet. While the House of Representatives cannot usually overrule the Senate on a bill, the Senate can only delay the adoption of a budget or a treaty that has been approved by the House of Representatives, and the Senate has almost no power at all to prevent the lower house from selecting any Prime Minister it wishes. Furthermore, once appointed it is the confidence of the House of Representatives alone that the Prime Minister must enjoy in order to continue in office. The House of Representatives can overrule the upper house in the following circumstances:

- If a bill is adopted by the House of Representatives and then either rejected, amended or not approved within 60 days by the Senate, then the bill will become law if again adopted by the House of Representatives by at least a two-thirds majority of members present.
- If both houses cannot agree on a budget or a treaty, even through the appointment of a joint committee of the Diet, or if the Senate fails to take final action on a proposed budget or treaty within 30 days of its approval by the House of Representatives, then the decision of the lower house is deemed to be that of the Diet.
- If both houses cannot agree on a candidate for Prime Minister, even through a joint committee, or if the Senate fails to designate a candidate within 10 days of House of Representatives' decision, then the nominee of the lower house is deemed to be that of the Diet.
National Diet Building Interior

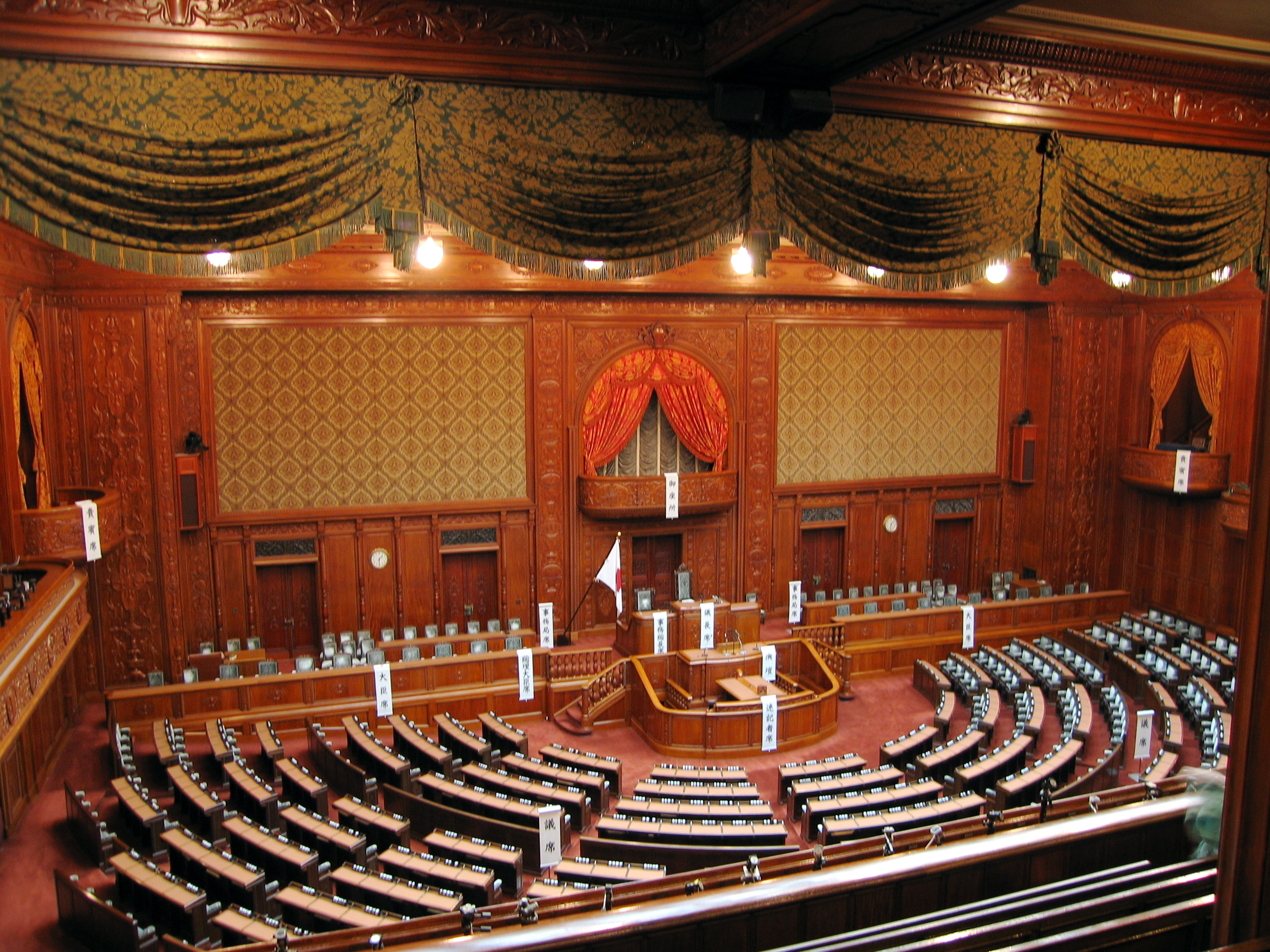
House of Representatives

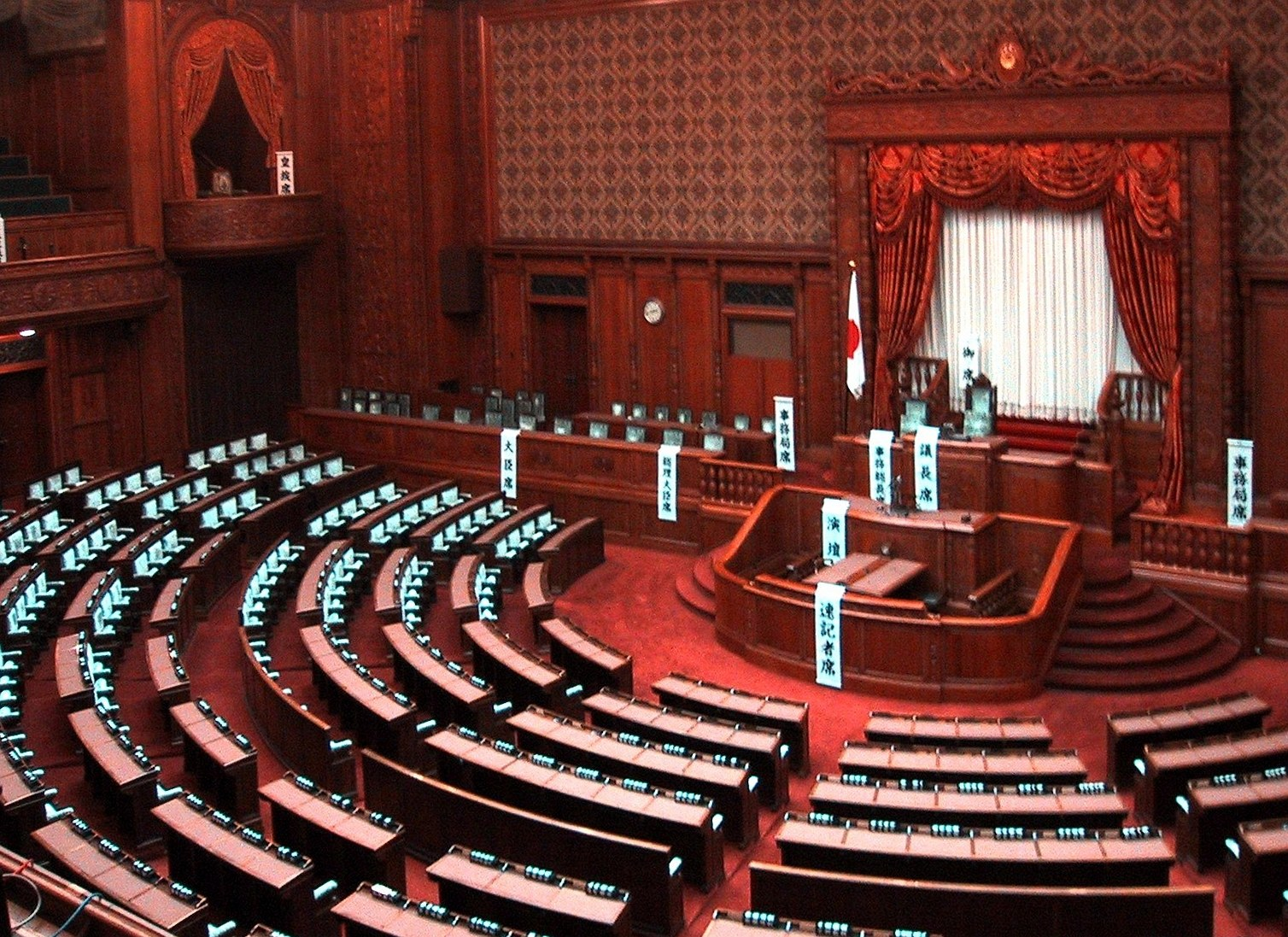
Senate

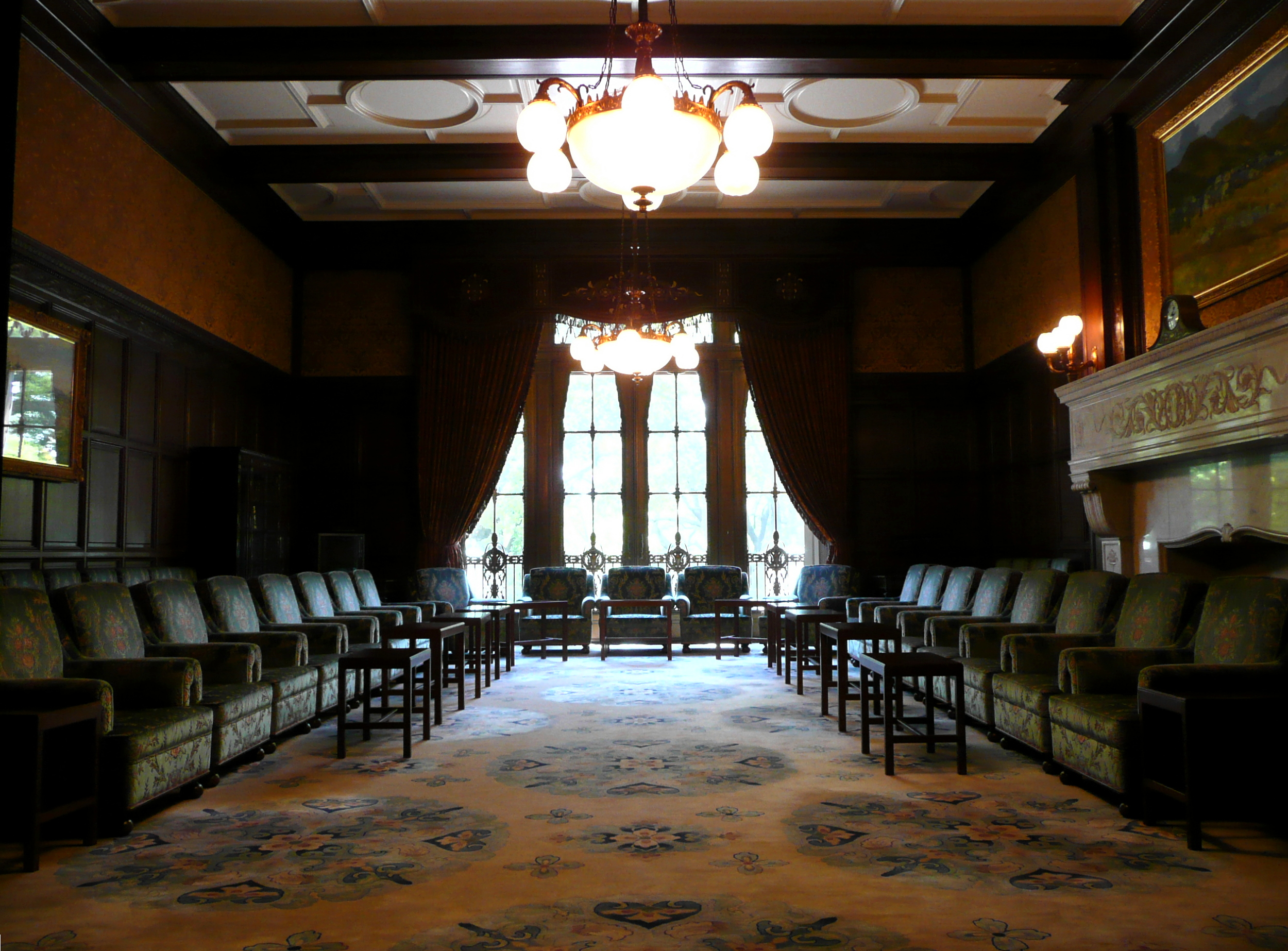
The waiting room adjacent to the Cabinet Room at the National Diet Building

== Activities ==
Under the Constitution, at least one session of the Diet must be convened each year. Technically, only the House of Representatives is dissolved before an election. But, while the lower house is in dissolution, the Senate is usually "closed". The Emperor both convokes the Diet and dissolves the House of Representatives but in doing so must act on the advice of the Cabinet. In an emergency the Cabinet can convoke the Diet for an extraordinary session, and an extraordinary session may be requested by one-quarter of the members of either house. At the beginning of each parliamentary session, the Emperor reads a special speech from his throne in the chamber of the Senate.

The presence of one-third of the membership of either house constitutes a quorum and deliberations are in public unless at least two-thirds of those present agree otherwise. Each house elects its own presiding officer who casts the deciding vote in the event of a tie. The Diet has parliamentary immunity. Members of each house have certain protections against arrest while the Diet is in session and arrested members must be released during the term of the session if the House demands. They are immune outside the house for words spoken and votes cast in the House. Each house of the Diet determines its own standing orders and has responsibility for disciplining its own members. A member may be expelled, but only by a two-thirds majority vote. Every member of the Cabinet has the right to appear in either house of the Diet for the purpose of speaking on bills, and each house has the right to compel the appearance of Cabinet members.

=== Legislative process ===
The vast majority of bills are submitted to the Diet by the Cabinet. Bills are usually drafted by the relevant ministry, sometimes with the advice of an external committee if the issue is sufficiently important or neutrality is necessary. Such advisory committees may include university professors, trade union representatives, industry representatives, and local governors and mayors, and invariably include retired officials. Such draft bills would be sent to the Cabinet Legislation Bureau of the government, as well as to the ruling party.

== History ==
Japan's first modern legislature was the Imperial Diet (帝国議会, Teikoku-gikai) established by the Meiji Constitution in force from 1889 to 1947. The Meiji Constitution was adopted on February 11, 1889, and the Imperial Diet first met on November 29, 1890, when the document entered into force. The first Imperial Diet of 1890 was plagued by controversy and political tensions. The Prime Minister of Japan at that time was General Count Yamagata Aritomo, who entered into a confrontation with the legislative body over military funding. During this time, there were many critics of the army who derided the Meiji slogan of "rich country, strong military" as in effect producing a poor country (albeit with a strong military). They advocated for infrastructure projects and lower taxes instead and felt their interests were not being served by high levels of military spending. As a result of these early conflicts, public opinion of politicians was not favorable.

The Imperial Diet consisted of a House of Representatives and a House of Peers (貴族院, Kizoku-in). The House of Representatives was directly elected, if on a limited franchise; universal adult male suffrage was introduced in 1925 when the Universal Manhood Suffrage Law was passed, but excluded women, and was limited to men 25 years or older. The House of Peers, much like the British House of Lords, consisted of high-ranking nobles chosen by the Emperor.

The first election by universal suffrage without distinction of sex was held in 1946, but it was not until 1947, when the constitution for post-war Japan came into effect, that universal suffrage was established In Japan.

The word diet derives from Latin and was a common name for an assembly in medieval European polities like the Holy Roman Empire. The Meiji Constitution was largely based on the form of constitutional monarchy found in nineteenth century Prussia that placed the king not as a servant of the state but rather the sole holder of power and sovereignty over his kingdom, which the Japanese view of their emperor and his role at the time favoured. The new Diet was modeled partly on the German Reichstag and partly on the British Westminster system. Unlike the post-war constitution, the Meiji constitution granted a real political role to the Emperor, although in practice the Emperor's powers were largely directed by a group of oligarchs called the genrō or elder statesmen.

To become law or bill, a constitutional amendment had to have the assent of both the Diet and the Emperor. This meant that while the Emperor could no longer legislate by decree he still had a veto over the Diet. The Emperor also had complete freedom in choosing the Prime Minister and the Cabinet, and so, under the Meiji Constitution, Prime Ministers often were not chosen from and did not enjoy the confidence of the Diet. The Imperial Diet was also limited in its control over the budget. However, the Diet could veto the annual budget. If no budget was approved, the budget of the previous year continued in force. This changed with the new constitution after World War II.

The proportional representation system for the Senate, introduced in 1982, was the first major electoral reform under the post-war constitution. Instead of choosing national constituency candidates as individuals, as had previously been the case, voters cast ballots for parties. Individual senators, listed officially by the parties before the election, are selected on the basis of the parties' proportions of the total national constituency vote. The system was introduced to reduce the excessive money spent by candidates for the national constituencies. Critics charged, however, that this new system benefited the two largest parties, the LDP and the Japan Socialist Party (now Social Democratic Party), which in fact had sponsored the reform. As a result of both the 2024 Japanese general election and the 2025 Japanese House of Councillors election, the LDP for the first time in party history failed to control either of the two houses in the National Diet.

National Diet buildings

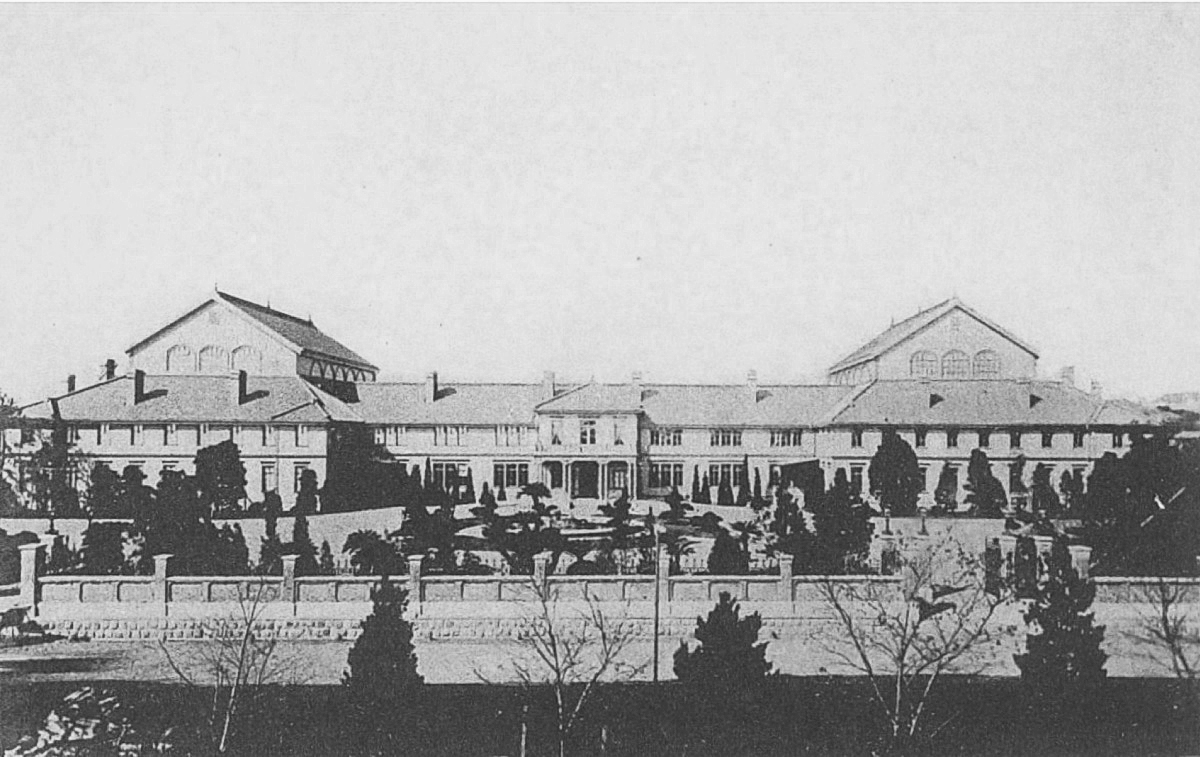
The First Japanese Diet Hall (1890–91)

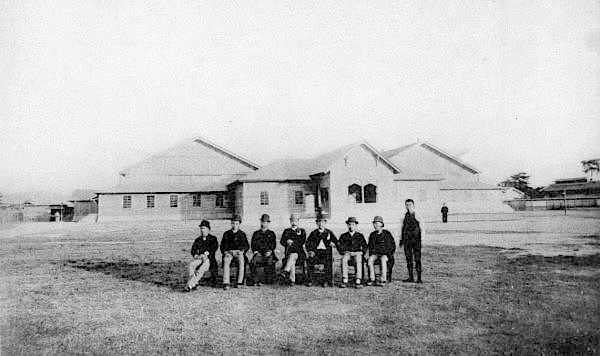
National Diet Hiroshima Temporary Building (1894)

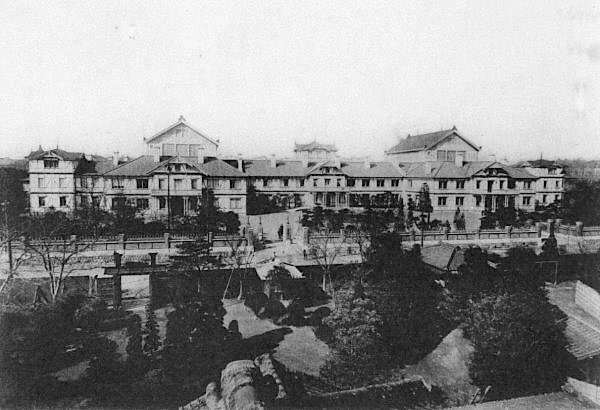
The Second Japanese Diet Hall (1891–1925)

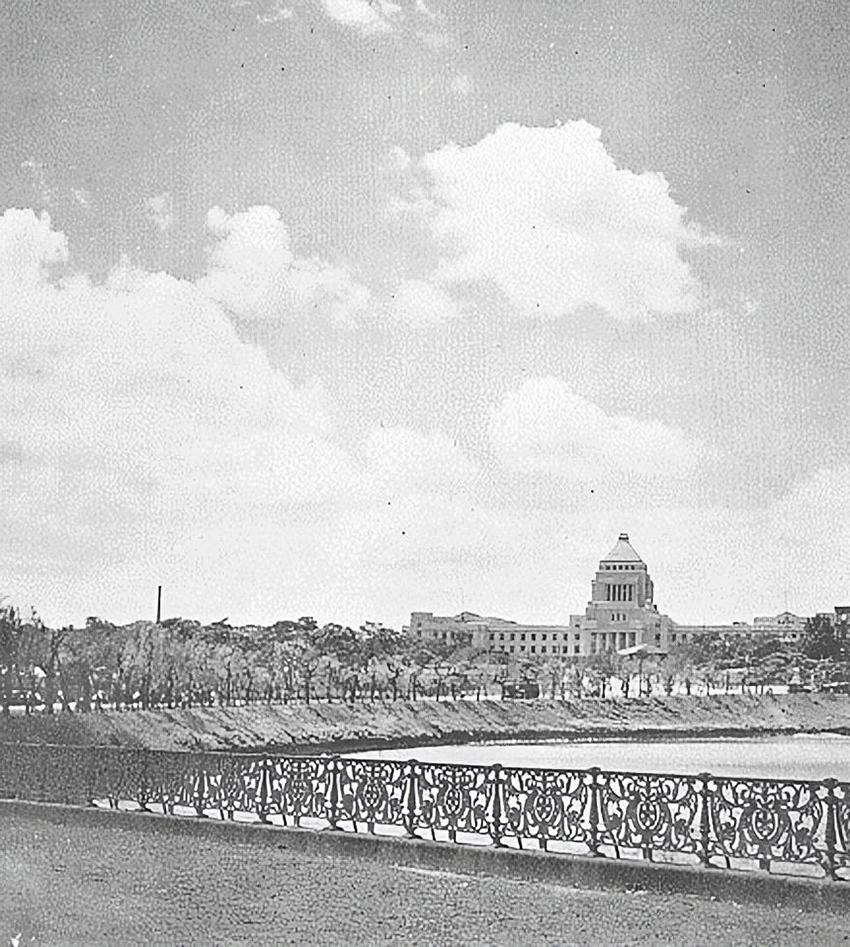
National Diet Building (1930)

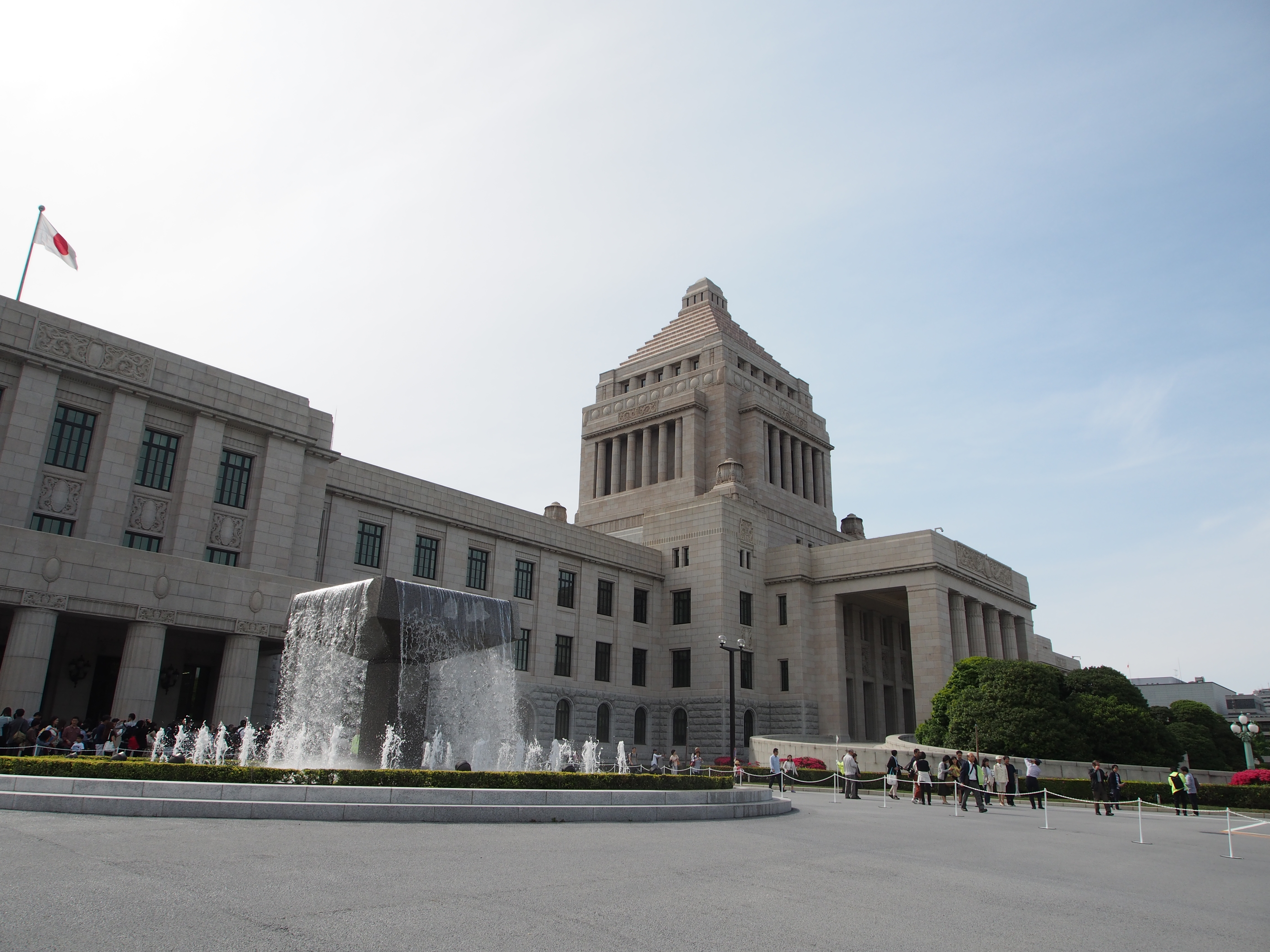
National Diet Building (2017)

== List of sessions ==
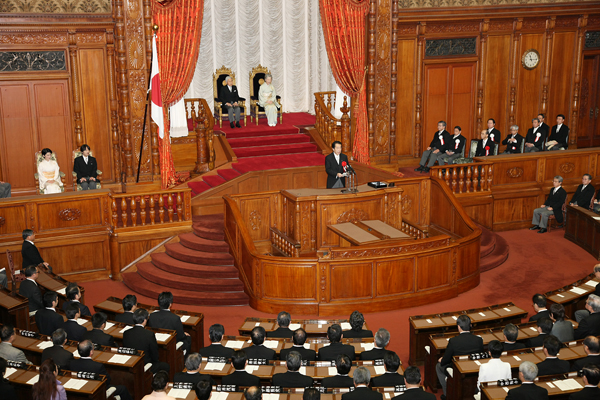
Emperor Akihito and Empress Michiko seated in the Chamber of the Senate of the National Diet, with members of the imperial family, the cabinet, and Prime Minister Naoto Kan giving the government's speech in front of the assembled members of parliament (2010)

There are three types of sessions of the National Diet:

- R – jōkai (常会), regular, annual sessions of the National Diet, often called "regular National Diet" (通常国会, tsūjō Kokkai). These are nowadays usually called in January, they last for 150 days and can be extended once.
- E – rinjikai (臨時会), extraordinary sessions of the National Diet, often called "extraordinary National Diet" (臨時国会, rinji Kokkai). These are often called in autumn, or in the summer after a regular election of the Senate (参議院議員通常選挙, sangiingiin tsūjōsenkyo) or after a full-term general election of the House of Representatives (衆議院議員総選挙, shūgiingiin sōsenkyo). Its length is negotiated between the two houses and can be extended twice.
- S – tokubetsukai (特別会), special sessions of the National Diet, often called "special National Diet" (特別国会, tokubetsu Kokkai). They are called only after a dissolution and early general election of the House of Representatives. Because the cabinet must resign after a House of Representatives election, the National Diet always chooses a prime minister-designate in a special session (but inversely, not all PM elections take place in a special Diet). A special session can be extended twice.
- HCES – There is a fourth type of legislative session: If the House of Representatives is dissolved, a National Diet cannot be convened. In urgent cases, the cabinet may invoke an emergency session (緊急集会, kinkyū shūkai) of the Senate to take provisional decisions for the whole Diet. As soon as the whole National Diet convenes again, these decisions must be confirmed by the House of Representatives or become ineffective. Such emergency sessions have been called twice in history, in 1952 and 1953.

Any session of the National Diet may be cut short by a dissolution of the House of Representatives (衆議院解散, shūgiin kaisan). In the table, this is listed simply as "(dissolution)"; the Senate or the National Diet as such cannot be dissolved.

List of National Diet sessions
Diet	Type	Opened	Closed	Length in days (originally scheduled+extension[s])
1st	S	May 20, 1947	December 9, 1947	204 (50+154)
2nd	R	December 10, 1947	July 5, 1948	209 (150+59)
3rd	E	October 11, 1948	November 30, 1948	51 (30+21)
4th	R	December 1, 1948	December 23, 1948 (dissolution)	23 (150)
5th	S	February 11, 1949	May 31, 1949	110 (70+40)
6th	E	October 25, 1949	December 3, 1949	40 (30+10)
7th	R	December 4, 1949	May 2, 1950	150
8th	E	July 21, 1950	July 31, 1950	20
9th	E	November 21, 1950	December 9, 1950	19 (18+1)
10th	R	December 10, 1950	June 5, 1951	178 (150+28)
11th	E	August 16, 1951	August 18, 1951	3
12th	E	October 10, 1951	November 30, 1951	52 (40+12)
13th	R	December 10, 1951	July 31, 1952	225 (150+85)
14th (ja)	R	August 26, 1952	August 28, 1952 (dissolution)	3 (150)
–	[HCES]	August 31, 1952	August 31, 1952	[1]
15th (ja)	S	October 24, 1952	March 14, 1953 (dissolution)	142 (60+99)
–	[HCES]	March 18, 1953	March 20, 1953	[3]
16th	S	May 18, 1953	August 10, 1953	85 (75+10)
17th	E	October 29, 1953	November 7, 1953	10 (7+3)
18th	E	November 30, 1953	December 8, 1953	9
19th	R	December 10, 1953	June 15, 1957	188 (150+38)
20th	E	November 30, 1954	December 9, 1954	10 (9+1)
21st	R	December 10, 1954	January 24, 1955 (dissolution)	46 (150)
22nd	S	March 18, 1955	July 30, 1955	135 (105+30)
23rd	E	November 22, 1955	December 16, 1955	25
24th	R	December 20, 1955	June 3, 1956	167 (150+17)
25th	E	November 12, 1956	December 13, 1956	32 (25+7)
26th	R	December 20, 1956	May 19, 1957	151 (150+1)
27th	E	November 1, 1957	November 14, 1957	14 (12+2)
28th	R	December 20, 1957	April 25, 1958 (dissolution)	127 (150)
29th	S	June 10, 1958	July 8, 1958	29 (25+4)
30th	E	September 29, 1958	December 7, 1958	70 (40+30)
31st	R	December 10, 1958	May 2, 1959	144
32nd	E	June 22, 1959	July 3, 1959	12
33rd	E	October 26, 1959	December 27, 1959	63 (60+13)
34th	R	December 29, 1959	July 15, 1960	200 (150+50)
35th	E	July 18, 1960	July 22, 1960	5
36th	E	October 17, 1960	October 24, 1960 (dissolution)	8 (10)
37th	S	December 5, 1960	December 22, 1960	18
38th	R	December 26, 1960	June 8, 1961	165 (150+15)
39th	E	September 25, 1961	October 31, 1961	37
40th	R	December 9, 1961	May 7, 1962	150
41st	E	August 4, 1962	September 2, 1962	30
42nd	E	December 8, 1962	December 23, 1962	16 (12+4)
43rd	R	December 24, 1962	July 6, 1963	195 (150+45)
44th	E	October 15, 1963	October 23, 1963 (dissolution)	9 (30)
45th	S	December 4, 1963	December 18, 1963	15
46th	R	December 20, 1963	June 26, 1964	190 (150+40)
47th	E	November 9, 1964	December 18, 1964	40
48th	R	December 21, 1964	June 1, 1965	163 (150+13)
49th	E	July 22, 1965	August 11, 1965	21
50th	E	October 5, 1965	December 13, 1965	70
51st	R	December 20, 1965	June 27, 1966	190 (150+40)
52nd	E	July 11, 1966	July 30, 1966	20
53rd	E	November 30, 1966	December 20, 1966	21
54th (ja)	R	December 27, 1966	December 27, 1966 (dissolution)	1 (150)
55th	S	February 15, 1967	July 21, 1967	157 (136+21)
56th	E	July 27, 1967	August 18, 1967	23 (15+8)
57th	E	December 4, 1967	December 23, 1967	20
58th	R	December 27, 1967	June 3, 1968	160 (150+10)
59th	E	August 1, 1968	August 10, 1968	10
60th	E	December 10, 1968	December 21, 1968	12
61st	R	December 27, 1968	August 5, 1969	222 (150+72)
62nd	E	November 29, 1969	December 2, 1969 (dissolution)	4 (14)
63rd	S	January 14, 1970	May 13, 1970	120
64th (ja)	E	November 24, 1970	December 18, 1970	25
65th	R	December 26, 1970	May 24, 1971	150
66th	E	July 14, 1971	July 24, 1971	11
67th	E	October 16, 1971	December 27, 1971	73 (70+3)
68th	R	December 29, 1971	June 16, 1972	171 (150+21)
69th	E	July 6, 1972	July 12, 1972	7
70th	E	October 27, 1972	November 13, 1972 (dissolution)	18 (21)
71st (ja)	S	December 22, 1972	September 27, 1973	280 (150+130)
72nd	R	December 1, 1973	June 3, 1974	185 (150+35)
73rd	E	July 24, 1974	July 31, 1974	8
74th	E	December 9, 1974	December 25, 1974	17
75th	R	December 27, 1974	July 4, 1975	190 (150+40)
76th	E	September 11, 1975	December 25, 1975	106 (75+31)
77th	R	December 27, 1975	May 24, 1976	150
78th	E	September 16, 1976	November 4, 1976	50
79th	E	December 24, 1976	December 28, 1976	5
80th	R	December 30, 1976	June 9, 1977	162 (150+12)
81st	E	July 27, 1977	August 3, 1977	8
82nd	E	September 29, 1977	November 25, 1977	58 (40+18)
83rd	E	December 7, 1977	December 10, 1977	4
84th	R	December 19, 1977	June 16, 1978	180 (150+30)
85th	E	September 18, 1978	October 21, 1978	34
86th	E	December 6, 1978	December 12, 1978	7
87th	R	December 22, 1978	June 14, 1979	175 (150+25)
88th	E	August 30, 1979	September 7, 1979 (dissolution)	9 (30)
89th	S	October 30, 1979	November 16, 1979	18
90th	E	November 26, 1979	December 11, 1979	16
91st	R	December 21, 1979	May 19, 1980 (dissolution)	151 (150+9)
92nd	S	July 17, 1980	July 26, 1980	10
93rd	E	September 29, 1980	November 29, 1980	62 (50+12)
94th	R	December 22, 1980	June 6, 1981	167 (150+17)
95th	E	September 27, 1981	November 28, 1981	66 (55+11)
96th (ja)	R	December 21, 1981	August 21, 1982	244 (150+94)
97th	E	November 26, 1982	December 25, 1982	30 (25+5)
98th	R	December 28, 1982	May 26, 1983	150
99th	E	July 18, 1983	July 23, 1983	6
100th	E	September 8, 1983	November 28, 1983 (dissolution)	82 (70+12)
101st	S	December 26, 1983	August 8, 1984	227 (150+77)
102nd	R	December 1, 1984	June 25, 1985	207 (150+57)
103rd	E	October 14, 1985	December 21, 1985	69 (62+7)
104th	R	December 24, 1985	May 22, 1986	150
105th (ja)	E	June 2, 1986	June 2, 1986 (dissolution)	1
106th	S	July 22, 1986	July 25, 1986	4
107th	E	September 11, 1986	July 25, 1986	4
108th	R	December 29, 1986	May 27, 1987	150
109th	E	July 6, 1987	September 19, 1987	76 (65+11)
110th	E	November 6, 1987	November 11, 1987	6
111th	E	November 27, 1987	December 12, 1987	16
112th	R	December 28, 1987	May 25, 1988	150
113th	E	July 19, 1988	December 28, 1988	163 (70+93)
114th	R	December 30, 1988	June 22, 1989	175 (150+25)
115th	E	August 7, 1989	August 12, 1989	6
116th	E	September 28, 1989	December 16, 1989	80
117th	R	December 25, 1989	January 24, 1990 (dissolution)	31 (150)
118th	S	February 27, 1990	June 26, 1990	120
119th	E	October 12, 1990	November 10, 1990	30
120th	R	December 10, 1990	May 8, 1991	150
121st	E	August 5, 1991	October 4, 1991	61
122nd	E	November 5, 1991	December 21, 1991	47 (36+11)
123rd	R	January 24, 1992	June 21, 1992	150
124th	E	August 7, 1992	August 11, 1992	5
125th	E	October 30, 1992	December 10, 1992	42 (40+2)
126th	R	January 22, 1993	June 18, 1993 (dissolution)	148 (150)
127th	S	August 5, 1993	August 28, 1993	24 (10+14)
128th	E	September 17, 1993	January 29, 1994	135 (90+45)
129th	R	January 31, 1994	June 29, 1994	150
130th	E	July 18, 1994	July 22, 1994	5
131st	E	September 30, 1994	December 9, 1994	71 (65+6)
132nd	R	January 20, 1995	June 18, 1995	150
133rd	E	August 4, 1995	August 8, 1995	5
134th	E	September 29, 1995	December 15, 1995	78 (46+32)
135th	E	January 11, 1996	January 13, 1996	3
136th (ja)	R	January 22, 1996	June 19, 1996	150
137th	E	September 27, 1996	September 27, 1996 (dissolution)	1
138th	S	November 7, 1996	November 12, 1996	6
139th	E	November 29, 1996	December 18, 1996	20
140th	R	January 20, 1997	June 18, 1997	150
141st	E	September 29, 1997	December 12, 1997	75
142nd	R	January 12, 1998	June 18, 1998	158 (150+8)
143rd (ja)	E	July 30, 1998	October 16, 1998	79 (70+9)
144th	E	November 27, 1998	December 14, 1998	18
145th	R	January 19, 1999	August 13, 1999	207 (150+57)
146th	E	October 29, 1999	December 15, 1999	48
147th	R	January 20, 2000	June 2, 2000 (dissolution)	135 (150)
148th (ja)	S	July 4, 2000	July 6, 2000	3
149th	E	July 28, 2000	August 9, 2000	13
150th	E	September 21, 2000	December 1, 2000	72
151st	R	January 31, 2001	June 29, 2001	150
152nd	E	August 7, 2001	August 10, 2001	4
153rd	E	September 27, 2001	December 7, 2001	72
154th	R	January 21, 2002	July 31, 2002	192 (150+42)
155th	E	October 18, 2002	December 13, 2002	57
156th	R	January 20, 2003	July 28, 2003	190 (150+40)
157th	E	September 29, 2003	October 10, 2003 (dissolution)	15 (36)
158th	S	November 19, 2003	November 27, 2003	9
159th	R	January 19, 2004	June 16, 2004	150
160th	E	July 30, 2004	August 6, 2004	8
161st	E	October 12, 2004	December 3, 2004	53
162nd	R	January 21, 2005	August 8, 2005 (dissolution)	200 (150+55)
163rd (ja)	S	September 21, 2005	November 1, 2005	42
164th (ja)	R	January 20, 2006	June 18, 2006	150
165th (ja)	S	September 26, 2006	December 19, 2006	85 (81+4)
166th (ja)	R	January 25, 2007	July 5, 2007	162 (150+12)
167th (ja)	E	August 7, 2007	August 10, 2007	4
168th (ja)	E	September 10, 2007	January 15, 2008	128 (62+66)
169th (ja)	R	January 18, 2008	June 21, 2008	156 (150+6)
170th (ja)	E	September 24, 2008	December 25, 2008	93 (68+25)
171st (ja)	R	January 5, 2009	July 21, 2009 (dissolution)	198 (150+55)
172nd (ja)	S	September 16, 2009	September 19, 2009	4
173rd (ja)	E	October 26, 2009	December 4, 2009	40 (36+4)
174th (ja)	R	January 18, 2010	June 16, 2010	150
175th (ja)	E	July 30, 2010	August 6, 2010	8
176th (ja)	E	October 1, 2010	December 3, 2010	64
177th (ja)	R	January 24, 2011	August 31, 2011	220 (150+70)
178th (ja)	E	September 13, 2011	September 30, 2011	18 (4+14)
179th (ja)	E	October 20, 2011	December 9, 2011	51
180th (ja)	R	January 24, 2012	September 8, 2012	229 (150+79)
181st (ja)	E	October 29, 2012	November 16, 2012 (dissolution)	19 (33)
182nd (ja)	S	December 26, 2012	December 28, 2012	3
183rd (ja)	R	January 28, 2013	June 26, 2013	150
184th (ja)	E	August 2, 2013	August 7, 2013	6
185th (ja)	E	October 15, 2013	December 8, 2013	55 (53+2)
186th (ja)	R	January 24, 2014	June 22, 2014	150
187th (ja)	E	September 29, 2014	November 21, 2014 (dissolution)	54 (63)
188th (ja)	S	December 24, 2014	December 26, 2014	3
189th (ja)	R	January 26, 2015	September 27, 2015	245 (150+95)
190th (ja)	R	January 4, 2016	June 1, 2016	150
191st (ja)	E	August 1, 2016	August 3, 2016	3
192nd (ja)	E	September 26, 2016	December 17, 2016	83 (66+17)
193rd (ja)	R	January 20, 2017	June 18, 2017	150
194th (ja)	E	September 28, 2017	September 28, 2017 (dissolution)	1
195th (ja)	S	November 1, 2017	December 9, 2017	39
196th (ja)	R	January 22, 2018	July 22, 2018	182 (150+32)
197th (ja)	E	October 24, 2018	December 10, 2018	48
198th (ja)	R	January 28, 2019	June 26, 2019	150
199th (ja)	E	August 1, 2019	August 5, 2019	5
200th (ja)	E	October 4, 2019	December 9, 2019	67
201st (ja)	R	January 20, 2020	June 17, 2020	150
202nd (ja)	E	September 16, 2020	September 18, 2020	3
203rd (ja)	E	October 26, 2020	December 5, 2020	41
204th (ja)	R	January 18, 2021	June 16, 2021	150
205th (ja)	E	October 4, 2021	October 14, 2021 (dissolution)	11
206th (ja)	S	November 10, 2021	November 12, 2021	3
207th (ja)	E	December 6, 2021	December 21, 2021	16
208th (ja)	R	January 17, 2022	June 15, 2022	150
209th (ja)	E	August 3, 2022	August 5, 2022	3
210th (ja)	E	October 3, 2022	December 10, 2022	69
211th (ja)	R	January 23, 2023	June 21, 2023	150
212th (ja)	E	October 20, 2023	December 13, 2023	55
213th (ja)	R	January 26, 2024	June 23, 2024	150
214th (ja)	E	October 1, 2024	October 9, 2024 (dissolution)	9
215th (ja)	S	November 11, 2024	November 14, 2024	4
216th (ja)	E	November 28, 2024	December 24, 2024	27
217th (ja)	R	January 24, 2025	June 22, 2025	150
218th (ja)	E	August 1, 2025	August 5, 2025	5
219th (ja)	E	October 21, 2025	December 17, 2025	58
220th (ja)	R	January 23, 2026	January 23, 2026 (dissolution)	1
221st (ja)	S	February 18, 2026	July 25, 2026	158
222nd (ja)	E	October 5, 2026	Ongoing	

== List of House of Representatives general elections ==
=== 19th century ===
Election	Date	Prime Minister appointed by Emperor (during term)	Turnout	Seats	Date of dissolution (D) / expiration of term (E)	Registered voters	Largest party / Seats Share			Emperor
Imperial Diet (1890–1947); upper house: House of Peers										Meiji (era)
1st	1 July 1890	Yamagata Aritomo	93.91%	300		450,872	Constitutional Liberal	130	43.33%	Meiji (era)
1st	1 July 1890	(Matsukata Masayoshi)	93.91%	300		450,872	Constitutional Liberal	130	43.33%	Meiji (era)
2nd	15 February 1892	Matsukata Masayoshi	91.59%	300	(D) December 25, 1891	434,594	Constitutional Liberal	94	31.33%	Meiji (era)
2nd	15 February 1892	(Itō Hirobumi)	91.59%	300	(D) December 25, 1891	434,594	Constitutional Liberal	94	31.33%	Meiji (era)
3rd	March 1, 1894	Itō Hirobumi	88.76%	300	(D) December 30, 1893	440,113	Constitutional Liberal	120	40.00%	Meiji (era)
4th	1 September 1894	Itō Hirobumi	84.84%	300	(D) June 2, 1894	460,483	Constitutional Liberal	107	35.66%	Meiji (era)
4th	1 September 1894	(Matsukata Masayoshi)	84.84%	300	(D) June 2, 1894	460,483	Constitutional Liberal	107	35.66%	Meiji (era)
4th	1 September 1894	(Itō Hirobumi)	84.84%	300	(D) June 2, 1894	460,483	Constitutional Liberal	107	35.66%	Meiji (era)
5th	15 March 1898	Itō Hirobumi	87.50%	300	(D) December 25, 1897	452,637	Constitutional Liberal	105	35.00%	Meiji (era)
5th	15 March 1898	(Ōkuma Shigenobu)	87.50%	300	(D) December 25, 1897	452,637	Constitutional Liberal	105	35.00%	Meiji (era)
6th	10 August 1898	Ōkuma Shigenobu	79.91%	300	(D) June 10, 1898	502,292	Kensei Hontō	124	41.33%	Meiji (era)
6th	10 August 1898	(Yamagata Aritomo)	79.91%	300	(D) June 10, 1898	502,292	Kensei Hontō	124	41.33%	Meiji (era)
6th	10 August 1898	(Itō Hirobumi)	79.91%	300	(D) June 10, 1898	502,292	Kensei Hontō	124	41.33%	Meiji (era)
6th	10 August 1898	(Katsura Tarō)	79.91%	300	(D) June 10, 1898	502,292	Kensei Hontō	124	41.33%	Meiji (era)

=== 20th century ===
Election	Date	Prime Minister appointed by Emperor (during term)	Turnout	Seats	Date of dissolution (D) / expiration of term (E)	Registered voters	Largest party / Seats Share			Emperor
7th	August 10, 1902	Katsura Tarō	88.39%	376	(E) August 9, 1902	982,868	Rikken Seiyūkai	191	50.79%	Meiji (era)
8th	March 1, 1903	Katsura Tarō	86.17%	376	(D) December 28, 1902	958,322	Rikken Seiyūkai	175	46.54%	Meiji (era)
9th	1 March 1904	Katsura Tarō	86.06%	379	(D) December 11, 1903	762,445	Rikken Seiyūkai	133	35.09%	Meiji (era)
9th	1 March 1904	(Saionji Kinmochi)	86.06%	379	(D) December 11, 1903	762,445	Rikken Seiyūkai	133	35.09%	Meiji (era)
10th	15 May 1908	Saionji Kinmochi	85.29%	379	(E) March 27, 1908	1,590,045	Rikken Seiyūkai	187	49.34%	Meiji (era)
10th	15 May 1908	(Katsura Tarō)	85.29%	379	(E) March 27, 1908	1,590,045	Rikken Seiyūkai	187	49.34%	Meiji (era)
10th	15 May 1908	(Saionji Kinmochi)	85.29%	379	(E) March 27, 1908	1,590,045	Rikken Seiyūkai	187	49.34%	Meiji (era)
11th	15 May 1912	Saionji Kinmochi	89.58%	381	(E) May 14, 1912	1,506,143	Rikken Seiyūkai	209	54.85%	Meiji (era)
11th	15 May 1912	(Katsura Tarō)	89.58%	381	(E) May 14, 1912	1,506,143	Rikken Seiyūkai	209	54.85%	Taishō (era)
11th	15 May 1912	(Yamamoto Gonnohyōe)	89.58%	381	(E) May 14, 1912	1,506,143	Rikken Seiyūkai	209	54.85%	Taishō (era)
11th	15 May 1912	(Ōkuma Shigenobu)	89.58%	381	(E) May 14, 1912	1,506,143	Rikken Seiyūkai	209	54.85%	Taishō (era)
12th	25 March 1915	Ōkuma Shigenobu	92.13%	381	(D) December 25, 1914	1,546,411	Rikken Dōshikai	153	40.15%	Taishō (era)
12th	25 March 1915	(Terauchi Masatake)	92.13%	381	(D) December 25, 1914	1,546,411	Rikken Dōshikai	153	40.15%	Taishō (era)
13th	20 April 1917	Terauchi Masatake	91.92%	381	(D) January 25, 1917	1,422,126	Rikken Seiyūkai	165	43.30%	Taishō (era)
13th	20 April 1917	(Hara Takashi)	91.92%	381	(D) January 25, 1917	1,422,126	Rikken Seiyūkai	165	43.30%	Taishō (era)
14th	10 May 1920	Hara Takashi	86.73%	464	(D) February 26, 1920	3,069,148	Rikken Seiyūkai	278	59.91%	Taishō (era)
14th	10 May 1920	(Takahashi Korekiyo)	86.73%	464	(D) February 26, 1920	3,069,148	Rikken Seiyūkai	278	59.91%	Taishō (era)
14th	10 May 1920	(Katō Tomosaburō)	86.73%	464	(D) February 26, 1920	3,069,148	Rikken Seiyūkai	278	59.91%	Taishō (era)
14th	10 May 1920	(Yamamoto Gonnohyōe)	86.73%	464	(D) February 26, 1920	3,069,148	Rikken Seiyūkai	278	59.91%	Taishō (era)
14th	10 May 1920	(Kiyoura Keigo)	86.73%	464	(D) February 26, 1920	3,069,148	Rikken Seiyūkai	278	59.91%	Taishō (era)
15th	10 May 1924	Katō Takaaki	91.18%	464	(D) January 31, 1924	3,288,405	Kenseikai	151	32.54%	Taishō (era)
15th	10 May 1924	(Wakatsuki Reijirō)	91.18%	464	(D) January 31, 1924	3,288,405	Kenseikai	151	32.54%	Taishō (era)
15th	10 May 1924	(Tanaka Giichi)	91.18%	464	(D) January 31, 1924	3,288,405	Kenseikai	151	32.54%	Shōwa (era)
16th	20 February 1928	Tanaka Giichi	80.36%	466	(D) January 21, 1928	12,408,678	Rikken Seiyūkai	218	46.78%	Shōwa (era)
16th	20 February 1928	(Hamaguchi Osachi)	80.36%	466	(D) January 21, 1928	12,408,678	Rikken Seiyūkai	218	46.78%	Shōwa (era)
17th	20 February 1930	Hamaguchi Osachi	83.34%	466	(D) January 21, 1930	12,812,895	Rikken Minseitō	273	58.58%	Shōwa (era)
17th	20 February 1930	(Wakatsuki Reijirō)	83.34%	466	(D) January 21, 1930	12,812,895	Rikken Minseitō	273	58.58%	Shōwa (era)
17th	20 February 1930	(Inukai Tsuyoshi)	83.34%	466	(D) January 21, 1930	12,812,895	Rikken Minseitō	273	58.58%	Shōwa (era)
18th	20 February 1932	Inukai Tsuyoshi	81.68%	466	(D) January 21, 1932	13,237,841	Rikken Seiyukai	301	64.59%	Shōwa (era)
18th	20 February 1932	(Saitō Makoto)	81.68%	466	(D) January 21, 1932	13,237,841	Rikken Seiyukai	301	64.59%	Shōwa (era)
18th	20 February 1932	(Keisuke Okada)	81.68%	466	(D) January 21, 1932	13,237,841	Rikken Seiyukai	301	64.59%	Shōwa (era)
19th	20 February 1936	Kōki Hirota	78.65%	466	(D) January 21, 1936	14,479,553	Rikken Minseitō	205	43.99%	Shōwa (era)
19th	20 February 1936	(Senjūrō Hayashi)	78.65%	466	(D) January 21, 1936	14,479,553	Rikken Minseitō	205	43.99%	Shōwa (era)
20th	30 April 1937	Senjūrō Hayashi	73.31%	466	(D) March 31, 1937	14,618,298	Rikken Minseitō	179	38.41%	Shōwa (era)
20th	30 April 1937	(Fumimaro Konoe)	73.31%	466	(D) March 31, 1937	14,618,298	Rikken Minseitō	179	38.41%	Shōwa (era)
20th	30 April 1937	(Hiranuma Kiichirō)	73.31%	466	(D) March 31, 1937	14,618,298	Rikken Minseitō	179	38.41%	Shōwa (era)
20th	30 April 1937	(Nobuyuki Abe)	73.31%	466	(D) March 31, 1937	14,618,298	Rikken Minseitō	179	38.41%	Shōwa (era)
20th	30 April 1937	(Mitsumasa Yonai)	73.31%	466	(D) March 31, 1937	14,618,298	Rikken Minseitō	179	38.41%	Shōwa (era)
20th	30 April 1937	(Fumimaro Konoe)	73.31%	466	(D) March 31, 1937	14,618,298	Rikken Minseitō	179	38.41%	Shōwa (era)
20th	30 April 1937	(Fumimaro Konoe)	73.31%	466	(D) March 31, 1937	14,618,298	Rikken Minseitō	179	38.41%	Shōwa (era)
20th	30 April 1937	(Hideki Tojo)	73.31%	466	(D) March 31, 1937	14,618,298	Rikken Minseitō	179	38.41%	Shōwa (era)
21st	30 April 1942	Hideki Tojo	83.16%	466	(E) April 29, 1942	14,594,287	Imperial Rule Assistance Association	381	81.75%	Shōwa (era)
21st	30 April 1942	(Kuniaki Koiso)	83.16%	466	(E) April 29, 1942	14,594,287	Imperial Rule Assistance Association	381	81.75%	Shōwa (era)
21st	30 April 1942	(Kantarō Suzuki)	83.16%	466	(E) April 29, 1942	14,594,287	Imperial Rule Assistance Association	381	81.75%	Shōwa (era)
21st	30 April 1942	(Kantarō Suzuki)	83.16%	466	(E) April 29, 1942	14,594,287	Imperial Rule Assistance Association	381	81.75%	Shōwa (era)
21st	30 April 1942	(Prince Naruhiko Higashikuni)	83.16%	466	(E) April 29, 1942	14,594,287	Imperial Rule Assistance Association	381	81.75%	Shōwa (era)
21st	30 April 1942	(Kijūrō Shidehara)	83.16%	466	(E) April 29, 1942	14,594,287	Imperial Rule Assistance Association	381	81.75%	Shōwa (era)
22nd	April 10, 1946	Shigeru Yoshida	72.08%	466	(D) December 18, 1945	36,878,420	Liberal	141	30.25%	Shōwa (era)
23rd	25 April 1947	Tetsu Katayama	67.95%	466	(D) March 31, 1947	40,907,493	Socialist	143	30.68%	Shōwa (era)
23rd	25 April 1947	(Hitoshi Ashida)	67.95%	466	(D) March 31, 1947	40,907,493	Socialist	143	30.68%	Shōwa (era)
23rd	25 April 1947	(Shigeru Yoshida)	67.95%	466	(D) March 31, 1947	40,907,493	Socialist	143	30.68%	Shōwa (era)
National Diet (1947–present); upper house: Senate										Shōwa (era)
24th	23 January 1949	Shigeru Yoshida	74.04%	466	(D) December 23, 1948	42,105,300	Democratic Liberal	264	56.65%	Shōwa (era)
24th	23 January 1949	(Shigeru Yoshida)	74.04%	466	(D) December 23, 1948	42,105,300	Democratic Liberal	264	56.65%	Shōwa (era)
25th	October 1, 1952	Shigeru Yoshida	76.43%	466	(D) August 28, 1952	46,772,584	Liberal	240	51.50%	Shōwa (era)
26th	19 April 1953	Shigeru Yoshida	74.22%	466	(D) March 14, 1953	47,090,167	Liberal; Yoshida faction	199	42.70%	Shōwa (era)
26th	19 April 1953	(Ichirō Hatoyama)	74.22%	466	(D) March 14, 1953	47,090,167	Liberal; Yoshida faction	199	42.70%	Shōwa (era)
27th	27 February 1955	Ichirō Hatoyama	75.84%	467	(D) January 24, 1955	49,235,375	Democratic	185	39.61%	Shōwa (era)
27th	27 February 1955	(Ichirō Hatoyama)	75.84%	467	(D) January 24, 1955	49,235,375	Democratic	185	39.61%	Shōwa (era)
27th	27 February 1955	(Tanzan Ishibashi)	75.84%	467	(D) January 24, 1955	49,235,375	Democratic	185	39.61%	Shōwa (era)
27th	27 February 1955	(Nobusuke Kishi)	75.84%	467	(D) January 24, 1955	49,235,375	Democratic	185	39.61%	Shōwa (era)
28th	22 May 1958	Nobusuke Kishi	76.99%	467	(D) April 25, 1958	52,013,529	Liberal Democratic	287	61.45%	Shōwa (era)
28th	22 May 1958	(Hayato Ikeda)	76.99%	467	(D) April 25, 1958	52,013,529	Liberal Democratic	287	61.45%	Shōwa (era)
29th	November 20, 1960	Hayato Ikeda	73.51%	467	(D) October 24, 1960	54,312,993	Liberal Democratic	296	63.38%	Shōwa (era)
30th	21 November 1963	Hayato Ikeda	71.14%	467	(D) October 23, 1963	58,281,678	Liberal Democratic	283	60.59%	Shōwa (era)
30th	21 November 1963	(Eisaku Satō)	71.14%	467	(D) October 23, 1963	58,281,678	Liberal Democratic	283	60.59%	Shōwa (era)
31st	January 29, 1967	Eisaku Satō	73.99%	486	(D) December 27, 1966	62,992,796	Liberal Democratic	277	56.99%	Shōwa (era)
32nd	27 December 1969	Eisaku Satō	68.51%	486	(D) December 2, 1969	69,260,424	Liberal Democratic	288	59.25%	Shōwa (era)
32nd	27 December 1969	(Kakuei Tanaka)	68.51%	486	(D) December 2, 1969	69,260,424	Liberal Democratic	288	59.25%	Shōwa (era)
33rd	10 December 1972	Kakuei Tanaka	71.76%	491	(D) November 13, 1972	73,769,636	Liberal Democratic	271	55.19%	Shōwa (era)
33rd	10 December 1972	(Takeo Miki)	71.76%	491	(D) November 13, 1972	73,769,636	Liberal Democratic	271	55.19%	Shōwa (era)
34th	5 December 1976	Takeo Fukuda	73.45%	511	(E) December 9, 1976	77,926,588	Liberal Democratic	249	48.72%	Shōwa (era)
34th	5 December 1976	(Masayoshi Ōhira)	73.45%	511	(E) December 9, 1976	77,926,588	Liberal Democratic	249	48.72%	Shōwa (era)
35th	October 7, 1979	Masayoshi Ōhira	68.01%	511	(D) September 7, 1979	80,169,924	Liberal Democratic	248	48.53%	Shōwa (era)
36th	22 June 1980	Zenkō Suzuki	74.57%	511	(D) May 19, 1980	80,925,034	Liberal Democratic	284	55.57%	Shōwa (era)
36th	22 June 1980	(Yasuhiro Nakasone)	74.57%	511	(D) May 19, 1980	80,925,034	Liberal Democratic	284	55.57%	Shōwa (era)
37th	December 18, 1983	Yasuhiro Nakasone	67.94%	511	(D) November 28, 1983	84,252,608	Liberal Democratic	250	48.92%	Shōwa (era)
38th	2 June 1986	Yasuhiro Nakasone	71.40%	512	(D) June 2, 1986	86,426,845	Liberal Democratic	300	58.59%	Shōwa (era)
38th	2 June 1986	(Noboru Takeshita)	71.40%	512	(D) June 2, 1986	86,426,845	Liberal Democratic	300	58.59%	Shōwa (era)
38th	2 June 1986	(Sōsuke Uno)	71.40%	512	(D) June 2, 1986	86,426,845	Liberal Democratic	300	58.59%	Akihito (Heisei) (era)
38th	2 June 1986	(Toshiki Kaifu)	71.40%	512	(D) June 2, 1986	86,426,845	Liberal Democratic	300	58.59%	Akihito (Heisei) (era)
39th	18 February 1990	Toshiki Kaifu	73.31%	512	(D) January 24, 1990	90,322,908	Liberal Democratic	275	53.71%	Akihito (Heisei) (era)
39th	18 February 1990	(Kiichi Miyazawa)	73.31%	512	(D) January 24, 1990	90,322,908	Liberal Democratic	275	53.71%	Akihito (Heisei) (era)
40th	18 July 1993	Morihiro Hosokawa	67.26%	511	(D) June 18, 1993	94,477,816	Liberal Democratic	223	43.63%	Akihito (Heisei) (era)
40th	18 July 1993	(Tsutomu Hata)	67.26%	511	(D) June 18, 1993	94,477,816	Liberal Democratic	223	43.63%	Akihito (Heisei) (era)
40th	18 July 1993	(Tomiichi Murayama)	67.26%	511	(D) June 18, 1993	94,477,816	Liberal Democratic	223	43.63%	Akihito (Heisei) (era)
40th	18 July 1993	(Ryūtarō Hashimoto)	67.26%	511	(D) June 18, 1993	94,477,816	Liberal Democratic	223	43.63%	Akihito (Heisei) (era)
41st	20 October 1996	Ryūtarō Hashimoto	59.65%	500	(D) September 27, 1996	97,680,719	Liberal Democratic	239	47.80%	Akihito (Heisei) (era)
41st	20 October 1996	(Keizō Obuchi)	59.65%	500	(D) September 27, 1996	97,680,719	Liberal Democratic	239	47.80%	Akihito (Heisei) (era)
41st	20 October 1996	(Yoshirō Mori)	59.65%	500	(D) September 27, 1996	97,680,719	Liberal Democratic	239	47.80%	Akihito (Heisei) (era)
42nd	25 June 2000	Yoshirō Mori	62.49%	480	(D) June 2, 2000	100,492,328	Liberal Democratic	233	48.54%	Akihito (Heisei) (era)
42nd	25 June 2000	(Junichiro Koizumi)	62.49%	480	(D) June 2, 2000	100,492,328	Liberal Democratic	233	48.54%	Akihito (Heisei) (era)

=== 21st century ===
Election	Date	Prime Minister appointed by Emperor (during term)	Turnout	Seats	Date of dissolution (D) / expiration of term (E)	Registered voters	Largest party / Seats Share			Emperor
43rd	9 November 2003	Junichiro Koizumi	59.86%	480	(D) 10 October 2003	102,306,684	Liberal Democratic	237	49.37%	Akihito (Heisei) (era)
44th	11 September 2005	Junichiro Koizumi	67.51%	480	(D) 8 August 2005	103,067,966	Liberal Democratic	296	61.66%	Akihito (Heisei) (era)
44th	11 September 2005	(Shinzo Abe)	67.51%	480	(D) 8 August 2005	103,067,966	Liberal Democratic	296	61.66%	Akihito (Heisei) (era)
44th	11 September 2005	(Yasuo Fukuda)	67.51%	480	(D) 8 August 2005	103,067,966	Liberal Democratic	296	61.66%	Akihito (Heisei) (era)
44th	11 September 2005	(Tarō Asō)	67.51%	480	(D) 8 August 2005	103,067,966	Liberal Democratic	296	61.66%	Akihito (Heisei) (era)
45th	30 August 2009	Yukio Hatoyama	69.28%	480	(D) 21 July 2009	104,057,361	Democratic	308	64.16%	Akihito (Heisei) (era)
45th	30 August 2009	(Naoto Kan)	69.28%	480	(D) 21 July 2009	104,057,361	Democratic	308	64.16%	Akihito (Heisei) (era)
45th	30 August 2009	(Yoshihiko Noda)	69.28%	480	(D) 21 July 2009	104,057,361	Democratic	308	64.16%	Akihito (Heisei) (era)
46th	16 December 2012	Shinzo Abe	59.32%	480	(D) 16 November 2012	103,959,866	Liberal Democratic	294	61.25%	Akihito (Heisei) (era)
47th	14 December 2014	Shinzo Abe	52.66%	475	(D) 21 November 2014	104,067,104	Liberal Democratic	291	61.26%	Akihito (Heisei) (era)
48th	22 October 2017	Shinzo Abe	53.68%	465	(D) 28 September 2017	106,091,229	Liberal Democratic	284	61.08%	Akihito (Heisei) (era)
48th	22 October 2017	(Yoshihide Suga)	53.68%	465	(D) 28 September 2017	106,091,229	Liberal Democratic	284	61.08%	Naruhito (Reiwa) (era)
48th	22 October 2017	(Fumio Kishida)	53.68%	465	(D) 28 September 2017	106,091,229	Liberal Democratic	284	61.08%	Naruhito (Reiwa) (era)
49th	31 October 2021	Fumio Kishida	55.93%	465	(D) 14 October 2021	105,622,758	Liberal Democratic	261	56.12%	Naruhito (Reiwa) (era)
49th	31 October 2021	(Shigeru Ishiba)	55.93%	465	(D) 14 October 2021	105,622,758	Liberal Democratic	261	56.12%	Naruhito (Reiwa) (era)
50th	27 October 2024	Shigeru Ishiba	53.85%	465	(D) 9 October 2024	103,880,749	Liberal Democratic	191	41.08%	Naruhito (Reiwa) (era)
50th	27 October 2024	(Sanae Takaichi)	53.85%	465	(D) 9 October 2024	103,880,749	Liberal Democratic	191	41.08%	Naruhito (Reiwa) (era)
51st	8 February 2026	Sanae Takaichi	56.26%	465	(D) 23 January 2026	103,211,224	Liberal Democratic	316	67.96%	Naruhito (Reiwa) (era)

== List of Senate regular elections ==
=== 20th century ===
Election	Cabinet	Prime Minister	Date	Turnout	Total seats	Elected seats	Term expiration date	Largest party / Seats share			Emperor
1st	Yoshida I	Shigeru Yoshida	20 April 1947	61.12%	250	250	2 May 1953	Socialist	47	18.80%	Shōwa (era)
2nd	Yoshida III	Shigeru Yoshida	4 June 1950	72.19%	250	125	3 June 1956	Liberal	76	30.40%	Shōwa (era)
3rd	Yoshida IV	Shigeru Yoshida	24 April 1953	63.18%	250	125	2 May 1959	Liberal	93	37.20%	Shōwa (era)
4th	I. Hatoyama III	Ichirō Hatoyama	8 July 1956	62.11%	250	125	7 July 1962	Liberal Democratic	122	48.80%	Shōwa (era)
5th	Kishi II	Nobusuke Kishi	2 June 1959	58.75%	250	125	1 June 1965	Liberal Democratic	132	52.80%	Shōwa (era)
6th	Ikeda II	Hayato Ikeda	1 July 1962	68.22%	250	125	7 July 1968	Liberal Democratic	142	56.80%	Shōwa (era)
7th	Satō I	Eisaku Satō	4 July 1965	67.02%	250	125	1 July 1971	Liberal Democratic	140	55.77%	Shōwa (era)
8th	Satō II	Eisaku Satō	7 July 1968	68.94%	250	125	7 July 1974	Liberal Democratic	142	54.80%	Shōwa (era)
9th	Satō III	Eisaku Satō	27 June 1971	59.24%	252	126	10 July 1977	Liberal Democratic	131	52.61%	Shōwa (era)
10th	K. Tanaka II	Kakuei Tanaka	7 July 1974	73.20%	252	126	7 July 1980	Liberal Democratic	126	50.40%	Shōwa (era)
11th	T. Fukuda	Takeo Fukuda	10 July 1977	68.49%	252	126	9 July 1983	Liberal Democratic	124	49.79%	Shōwa (era)
12th	Ōhira II	Masayoshi Ōhira	22 June 1980	74.54%	252	126	7 July 1986	Liberal Democratic	135	54.00%	Shōwa (era)
13th	Nakasone I	Yasuhiro Nakasone	26 June 1983	57.00%	252	126	9 July 1989	Liberal Democratic	137	54.36%	Shōwa (era)
14th	Nakasone II (R2)	Yasuhiro Nakasone	6 July 1986	71.36%	252	126	7 July 1992	Liberal Democratic	143	56.74%	Shōwa (era)
15th	Uno	Sōsuke Uno	23 July 1989	65.02%	252	126	22 July 1995	Liberal Democratic	109	43.25%	Akihito (Heisei) (era)
16th	Miyazawa	Kiichi Miyazawa	26 July 1992	50.72%	252	126	25 July 1998	Liberal Democratic	107	42.46%	Akihito (Heisei) (era)
17th	Murayama	Tomiichi Murayama	23 July 1995	44.52%	252	126	22 July 2001	Liberal Democratic	111	44.04%	Akihito (Heisei) (era)
18th	Hashimoto II (R)	Ryutaro Hashimoto	12 July 1998	58.84%	252	126	25 July 2004	Liberal Democratic	103	40.87%	Akihito (Heisei) (era)

=== 21st century ===
Election	Cabinet	Prime Minister	Date	Turnout	Total seats	Elected seats	Term expiration date	Majority party / Seats share			Emperor
19th	Koizumi I	Junichiro Koizumi	29 July 2001	56.44%	247	121	28 July 2007	Liberal Democratic	111	44.93%	Akihito (Heisei) (era)
20th	Koizumi II	Junichiro Koizumi	11 July 2004	56.57%	242	121	25 July 2010	Liberal Democratic	115	47.52%	Akihito (Heisei) (era)
21st	S. Abe I	Shinzo Abe	29 July 2007	58.64%	242	121	28 July 2013	Democratic	109	45.04%	Akihito (Heisei) (era)
22nd	Kan	Naoto Kan	11 July 2010	57.92%	242	121	25 July 2016	Democratic	106	43.80%	Akihito (Heisei) (era)
23rd	S. Abe II	Shinzo Abe	21 July 2013	52.61%	242	121	28 July 2019	Liberal Democratic	115	47.52%	Akihito (Heisei) (era)
24th	S. Abe III (R1)	Shinzo Abe	10 July 2016	54.70%	242	121	25 July 2022	Liberal Democratic	121	50.00%	Akihito (Heisei) (era)
25th	S. Abe IV (R1)	Shinzo Abe	21 July 2019	48.80%	245	124	28 July 2025	Liberal Democratic	113	46.12%	Naruhito (Reiwa) (era)
26th	Kishida II	Fumio Kishida	10 July 2022	52.05%	248	124	25 July 2028	Liberal Democratic	119	47.98%	Naruhito (Reiwa) (era)
27th	Ishiba II	Shigeru Ishiba	20 July 2025	58.51%	248	125	28 July 2031	Liberal Democratic	101	40.73%	Naruhito (Reiwa) (era)

== See also ==
- Bicameralism
- Diet (assembly)
- Government of Japan
- History of Japan
- List of legislatures by country
- List of members of the Diet of Japan
  - List of current members of the House of Representatives of Japan
  - List of current senators of Japan
- National Diet Building
- National Diet Library
- Parliamentary system
- Politics of Japan
- ja:国会開会式 – Opening ceremony of National Diet
