= Daidō Club =

Japanese political party

The Daidō Club (Japanese: 大同倶楽部, lit. Like-Minded Thinkers' Club) was a political party in Japan.

== History ==
The party was established in December 1905 as a merger of the Kōshin Club (27 MPs), the Liberal Party (19 MPs) and Teikokutō (18 MPs). The party gradually lost MPs through defections, and won only 29 seats in the 1908 elections. Defections continued after the elections, and the party was down to 22 MPs by 1910.

After an abortive attempt to form a new anti–Rikken Seiyūkai party in July 1908, the party merged with other anti-Rikken Seiyūkai factions in March 1910 to form the Chūō Club.
