= Yūkōkai =

Japanese political party

The Yūkōkai (Japanese: 猶興会, lit. Re-emergence Society) was a political party in Japan. It was active from 1906 until 1908.

== History ==
The party was established on 20 December 1906 by 36 National Diet members of the Seikō Club. It opposed Saionji Kinmochi's Rikken Seiyūkai government and its high level of spending on the military and public services, and advocated an anti-corruption campaign.

It won 29 seats in the 1908 elections. Following a failed attempt to form a new party by merging several parties opposed to the Rikken Seiyūkai government, it merged with a group of independent Diet members to form the Yūshinkai in December 1908.
