= Teikokutō =

Teikokutō 帝国党
- Leader: Sassa Tomofusa; Adachi Kenzō
- Founded: 5 July 1899
- Dissolved: 23 December 1905
- Preceded by: Kokumin Kyōkai
- Succeeded by: Daidō Club

The Teikokutō (Japanese: 帝国党, lit. Empire Party) was a political party in Japan. It was active from 1899 until 1905.

== History ==
The party was established on 5 July 1899 as a successor to the Kokumin Kyōkai. It initially had 21 seats and was supportive of the government and army, calling for increased military spending. In the 1902 elections it won 17 seats, retaining all 17 in the 1903 elections and going on to win 19 in the 1904 elections.

In December 1905 it merged with the Kōshin Club and the Liberal Party to form the Daidō Club.
