= 1908 Japanese general election =

- 15 May 1908

All 379 seats in the House of Representatives 190 seats needed for a majority
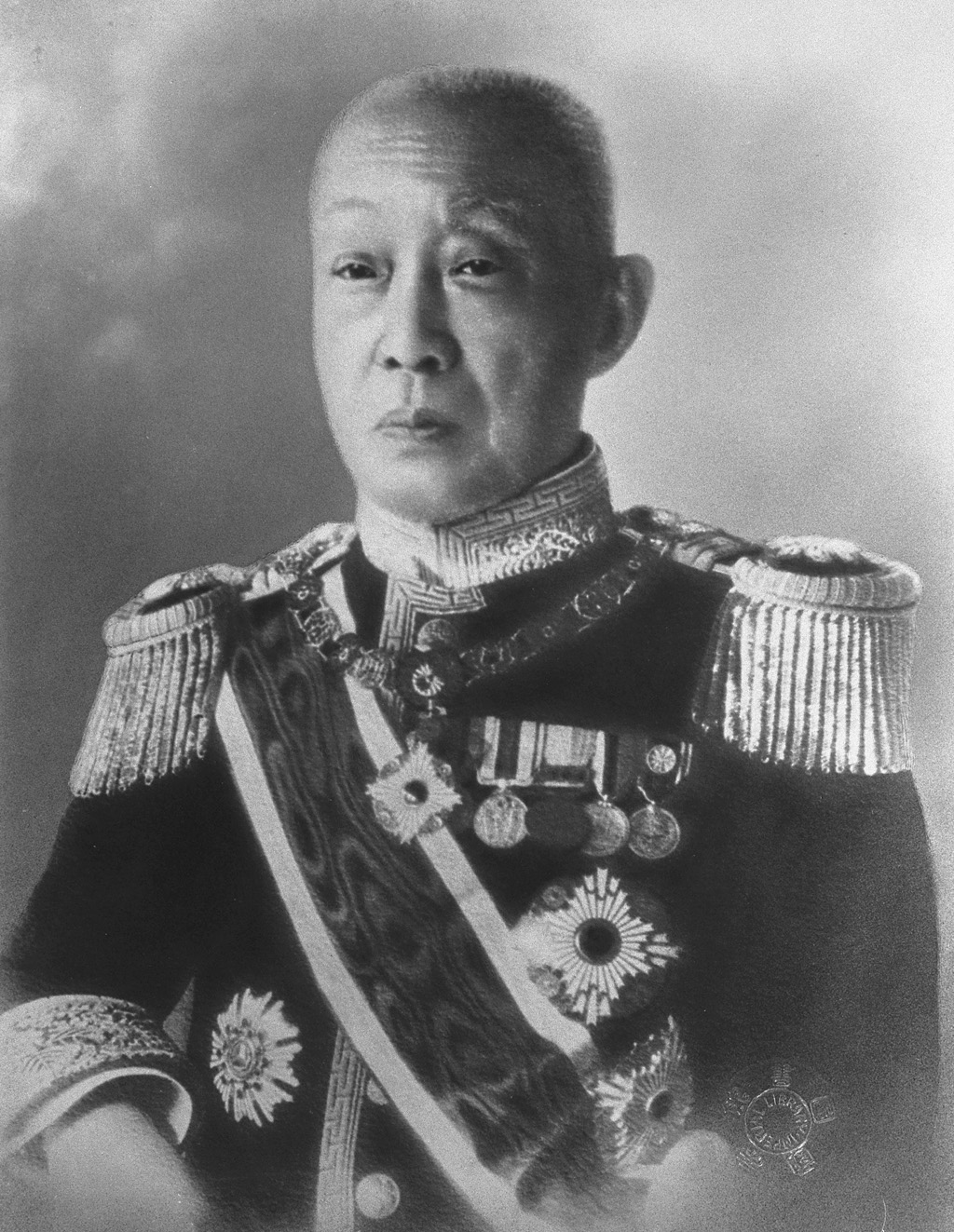
	First party	Second party
Leader	Saionji Kinmochi	Collective Leadership (Note: After Ōkuma Shigenobu resigned from the party, Ōishi Masami and Inukai Tsuyoshi co-leaded the party as General Directors.)
Party	Rikken Seiyūkai	Kensei Hontō
Last election	33.47%, 33 seats	26.19%, 90 seats
Seats won	187	70
Seat change	▲54	▼20
Popular vote	649,858	288,243
Percentage	48.40%	21.47%
Swing	▲14.93pp	▼4.72pp
	Third party	Fourth party
Leader		Collective leadership
Party	Yūkōkai	Daidō Club
Last election	–	12.76%, 58 seats (Note: Kōshin Club and Teikokutō)
Seats won	29	29
Seat change	New	▼29
Popular vote	99,690	92,477
Percentage	7.42%	6.89%
Swing	New	▼5.87pp
Prime Minister before election
Saionji Kinmochi
Rikken Seiyūkai
Prime Minister after election
Saionji Kinmochi
Rikken Seiyūkai

General elections were held in Japan on 15 May 1908. The result was a victory for the Rikken Seiyūkai party, which won 187 of the 379 seats.

== Electoral system ==
The 379 members of the House of Representatives were elected in 51 multi-member constituencies based on prefectures and cities. Voting was restricted to men aged over 25 who paid at least 10 yen a year in direct taxation.

== Campaign ==
A total of 900 candidates contested the 379 seats.

== Results ==
Party	Votes	%	Seats	+/–
Rikken Seiyūkai	649,858	48.40	187	+54
Kensei Hontō	288,243	21.47	70	–20
Yūkōkai	99,690	7.42	29	New
Daidō Club	92,477	6.89	29	–29
Others	212,377	15.82	64	+9
Total	1,342,645	100.00	379	0
Valid votes	1,342,645	99.00		
Invalid/blank votes	13,534	1.00		
Total votes	1,356,179	100.00		
Registered voters/turnout	1,590,045	85.29		
Source: Mackie & Rose

== By constituency ==
=== Tokyo City ===
Candidate	Party	Votes	%	Notes
Takagi Masutarō	Independent	4,344	16.22	Elected
Kurahara Korehiro	Yūkōkai	3,295	12.30	Elected
Hatoyama Kazuo	Rikken Seiyūkai	2,237	8.35	Elected
Nakano Takenaka	Independent	2,106	7.86	Elected
Ema Shun'ichi	Independent	1,712	6.39	Elected
Inamoto Saburō	Independent	1,598	5.97	Elected
Yamane Masatsugu	Daidō Club	1,493	5.57	Elected
Matsushita Gunji	Daidō Club	1,386	5.17	Elected
Miwa Shinjirō	Yūkōkai	1,361	5.08	Elected
Seki Naohiko	Kensei Hontō	1,300	4.85	Elected
Watanabe Kanjūrō	Rikken Seiyūkai	1,262	4.71	Elected
Isobe Shirō	Rikken Seiyūkai	1,207	4.51	
Aoki Shōtarō	Rikken Seiyūkai	1,163	4.34	
Ōishi Kumakichi	Kensei Hontō	916	3.42	
Takanashi Tetsushirō	Rikken Seiyūkai	710	2.65	
Hiyama Tetsusaburō	Independent	654	2.44	
None of the above		40	0.15	
Total		26,784	100.00	
Valid votes		26,784	99.30	
Invalid/blank votes		188	0.70	
Total votes		26,972	100.00	
Registered voters/turnout		33,870	79.63	

=== Tokyo Districts ===
Candidate	Party	Votes	%	Notes
Takagi Masatoshi	Yūkōkai	3,123	19.52	Elected
Urushi Shōgan	Rikken Seiyūkai	2,729	17.06	Elected
Okazaki Kunisuke	Rikken Seiyūkai	2,702	16.89	Elected
Morikubo Sakuzō	Rikken Seiyūkai	2,500	15.63	Elected
Murano Tsuneemon	Rikken Seiyūkai	2,465	15.41	Elected
Nakamura Katsumasa	Rikken Seiyūkai	2,398	14.99	
None of the above		80	0.50	
Total		15,997	100.00	
Valid votes		15,997	99.16	
Invalid/blank votes		135	0.84	
Total votes		16,132	100.00	
Registered voters/turnout		18,626	86.61	

=== Kyoto City ===
Candidate	Party	Votes	%	Notes
Nishimura Jibee	Independent	3,352	38.37	Elected
Kimura Seigo	Independent	2,138	24.48	Elected
Nakayasu Shinzaburō	Independent	1,814	20.77	Elected
Okuno Ichijirō	Rikken Seiyūkai	1,284	14.70	
None of the above		147	1.68	
Total		8,735	100.00	
Valid votes		8,735	99.05	
Invalid/blank votes		84	0.95	
Total votes		8,819	100.00	
Registered voters/turnout		10,780	81.81	
