= 1903 Japanese general election =

- 1 March 1903

All 376 seats in the House of Representatives 189 seats needed for a majority
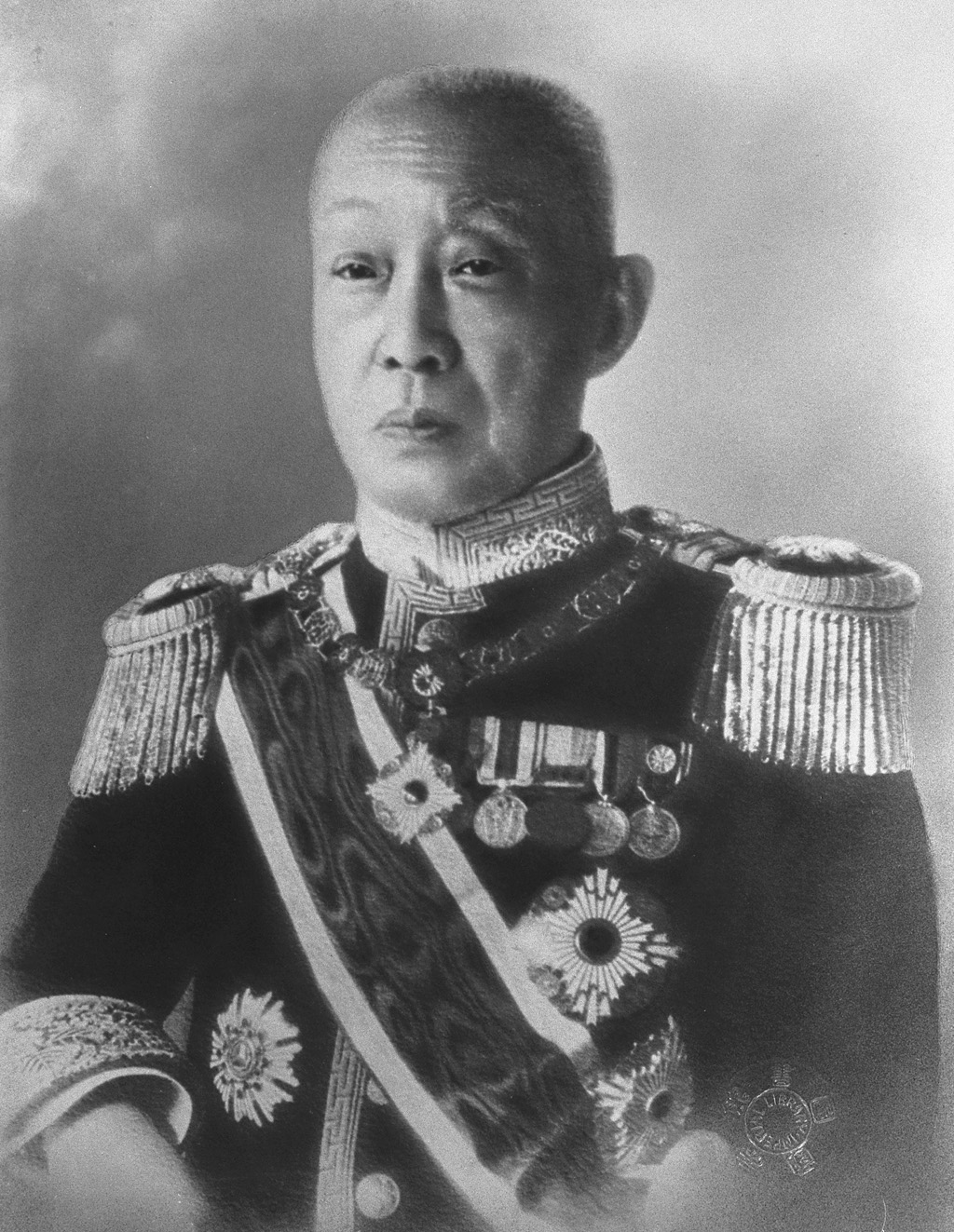

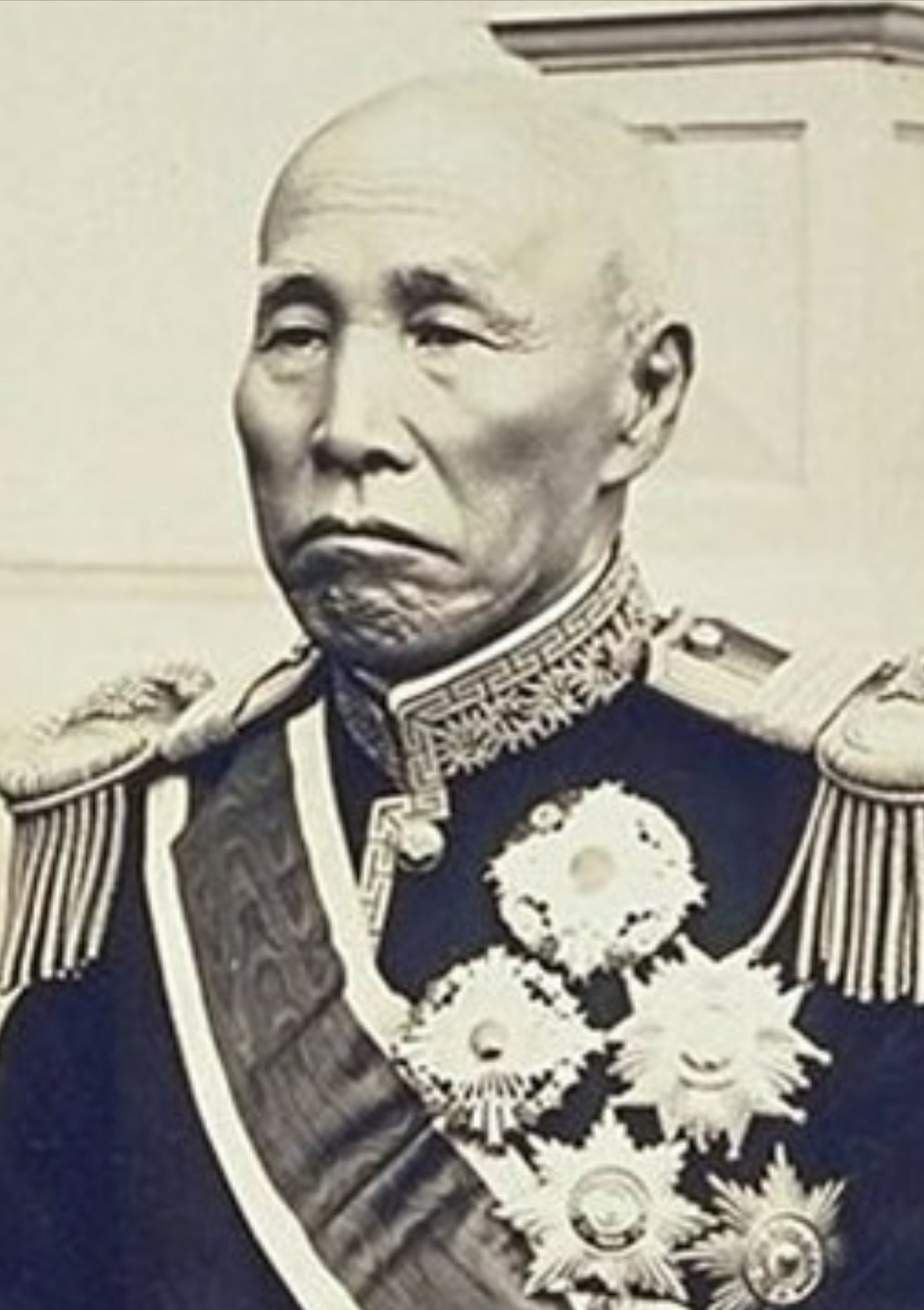
	First party	Second party
Leader	Saionji Kinmochi	Ōkuma Shigenobu
Party	Rikken Seiyūkai	Kensei Hontō
Last election	50.40%, 191 seats	25.68%, 95 seats
Seats won	175	85
Seat change	▼16	▼10
Popular vote	373,022	218,689
Percentage	45.42%	26.63%
Swing	▼4.98pp	▲0.95pp
Prime Minister before election
Katsura Tarō
Independent
Prime Minister after election
Katsura Tarō
Independent

General elections were held in Japan on 1 March 1903. The Rikken Seiyūkai party remained the largest in the House of Representatives, winning 175 of the 376 seats, but lost its majority.

== Electoral system ==
The 376 members of the House of Representatives were elected in 51 multi-member constituencies based on prefectures and cities. Voting was restricted to men aged over 25 who paid at least 10 yen a year in direct taxation.

== Campaign ==
A total of 537 candidates contested the 376 seats.

== Results ==
Party	Votes	%	Seats	+/–
Rikken Seiyūkai	373,022	45.42	175	–16
Kensei Hontō	218,689	26.63	85	–10
Chūsei Club	37,070	4.51	31	New
Teikokutō	34,811	4.24	17	0
Seiyū Club	24,129	2.94	13	New
Jinin Kai	2,748	0.33	0	–28
Dōshi Club	1,517	0.18	0	–13
Others	129,313	15.74	55	+23
Total	821,299	100.00	376	0
Valid votes	821,299	99.09		
Invalid/blank votes	7,527	0.91		
Total votes	828,826	100.00		
Registered voters/turnout	958,322	86.49		
Source: Mackie & Rose, Voice Japan
