= Rikken Kokumintō =

Rikken Kokumintō 立憲国民党
- Leader: Inukai Tsuyoshi
- Founded: 14 March 1910
- Dissolved: 1 September 1922
- Merger of: Kensei Hontō; Yūshinkai; Boshin Club (factions)
- Succeeded by: Kakushin Club
- Headquarters: Tokyo
- Ideology: Constitutionalism; Reformism; Liberalism; Tax restructuring
- Political position: Centre-left to Centre-right

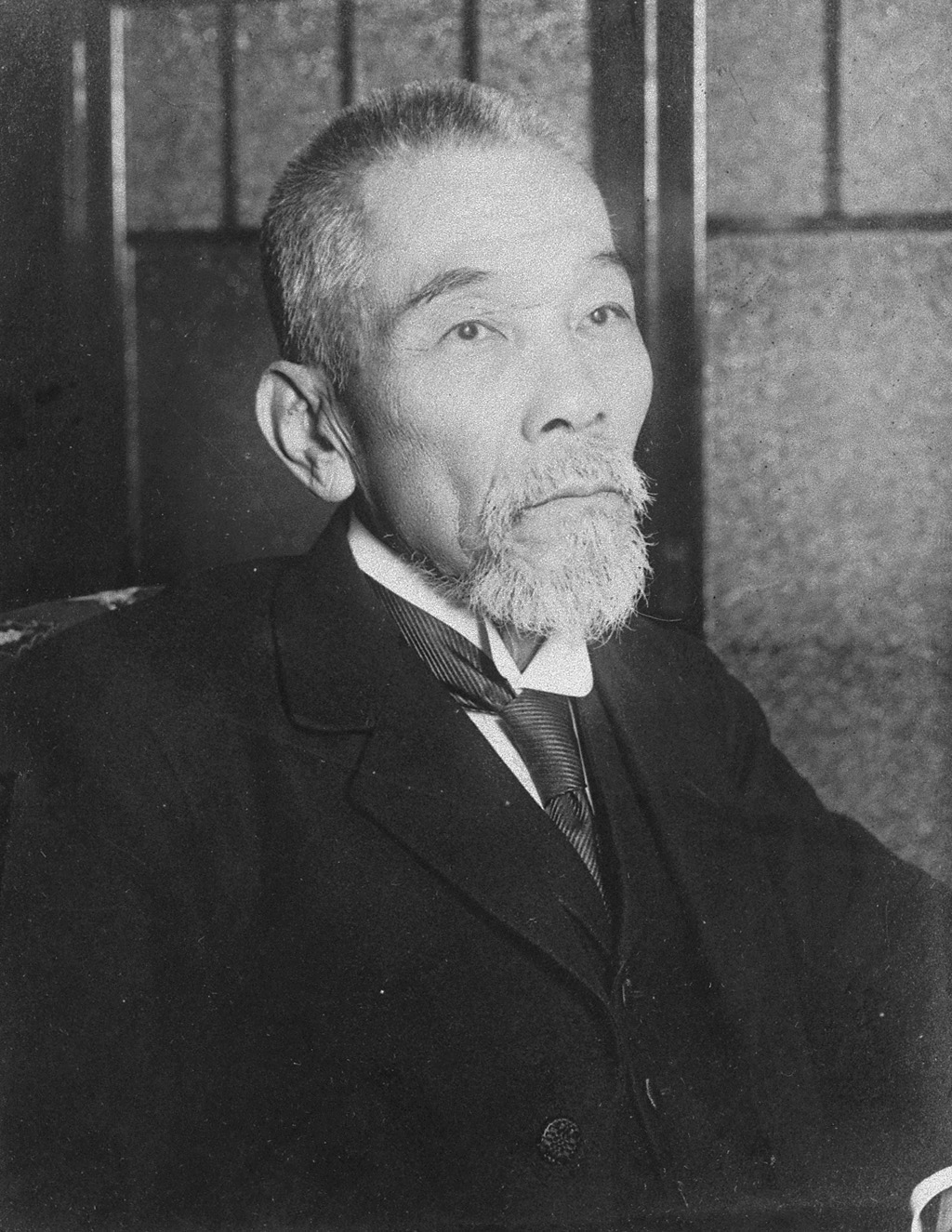
Inukai Tsuyoshi, founder of the Rikken Kokumintō

The Rikken Kokumintō (Japanese: 立憲国民党, lit. '"Constitutional Nationalist Party"') was a minor political party in the Empire of Japan. It was also known as simply the Kokumintō.

== History ==
The Kokumintō was founded in March 1910, by a merger of the Kensei Hontō with a number of minor political parties and groups within the Lower House of the Japanese Diet, and was dominated by Inukai Tsuyoshi. It advocated a constitution, an electoral franchise based on universal adult male suffrage and increased spending for the Imperial Japanese Navy. It took a strong stand against the power and influence of the genrō and Meiji oligarchy. In the 1912 general elections the new party secured 95 seats, making it the single largest opposition party (to the Rikken Seiyūkai) in the Lower House.

In January 1913, about half of the party defected to join the Rikken Dōshikai founded by Katsura Tarō. In the 1915 general elections the Kokumintō managed to retain only 27 seats. It was able to recover to 35 seats in the 1917 general elections, but in the 1920 general election dropped back to only 29 seats.

In September 1922 the Kokumintō disbanded, and many of its former members formed the core of the new Kakushin Club, also led by Inukai Tsuyoshi.

== Election results ==
Election	Votes	%	Seats	+/–
1912	381,465	28.50	95 / 381	Steady
1915	106,445	7.51	27 / 381	▼68
1917	125,974	9.68	35 / 381	▲8
1920	140,397	5.32	29 / 464	▼6
