= Rikken Dōshikai =

Rikken-Dōshi Kai 立憲同志会
- Leader: Katsura Tarō; Katō Takaaki
- Founder: Katsura Tarō
- Founded: 23 December 1913
- Dissolved: 10 October 1916
- Merger of: Chūō Club; Rikken Kokumintō (Reformist faction)
- Succeeded by: Kenseikai
- Headquarters: Tokyo

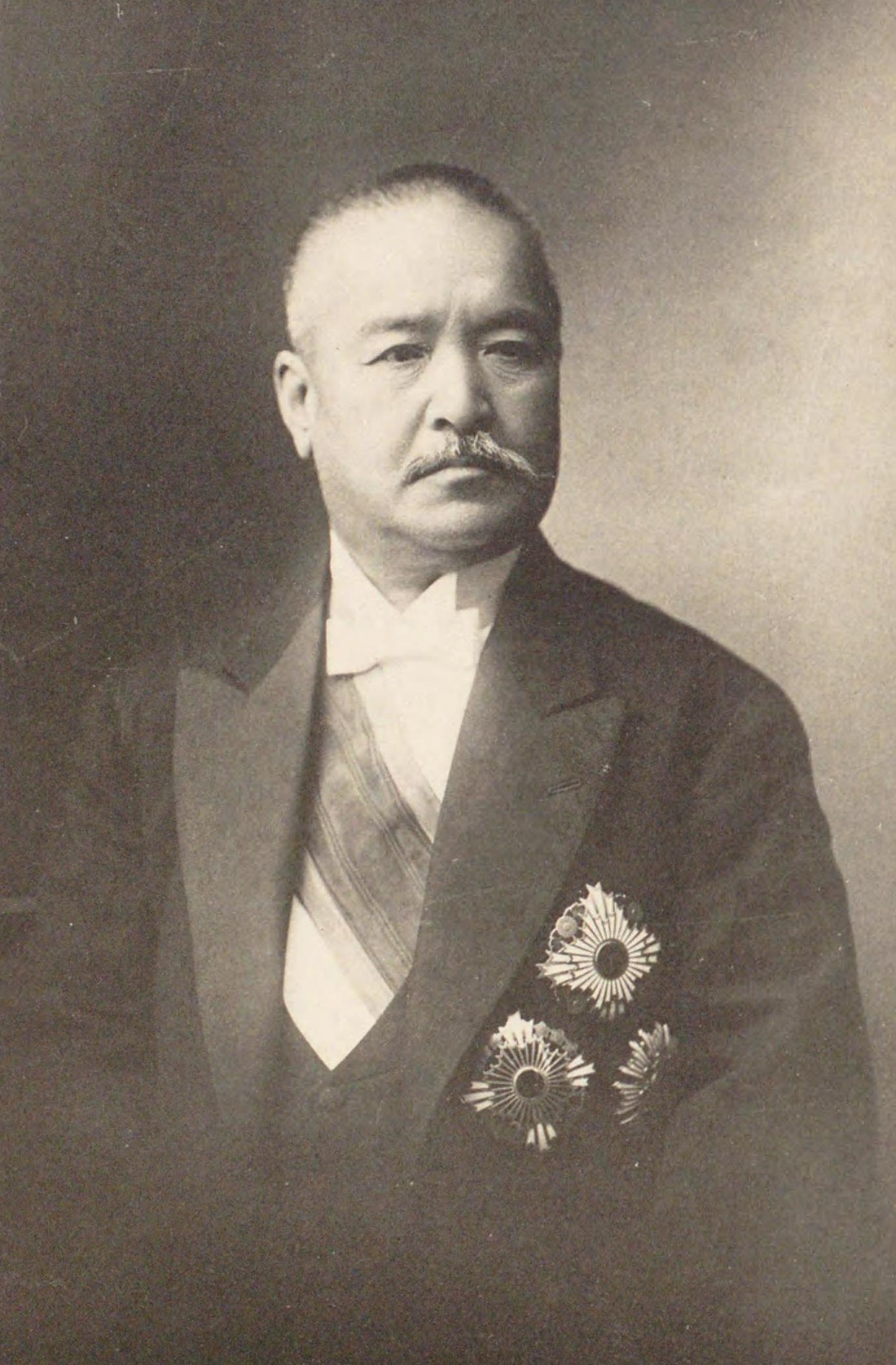
Katsura Tarō, founder of the Rikken Dōshikai

The Rikken-Dōshi Kai (Japanese: 立憲同志会, lit. 'Association of Comrades of the Constitution') was a political party active in the Empire of Japan in the early years of the 20th century. It was also known as simply the Dōshikai.

Founded by Prime Minister Katsura Tarō on February 7, 1913, the Rikken Dōshikai largely served to support his cabinet against criticism by Ozaki Yukio and his Rikken Seiyūkai party, which at the time held a majority of the seats in the Lower House of the Diet of Japan, as well as by Inukai Tsuyoshi of the Rikken Kokuminto party. Katsura was able to convince 90 Diet members (including all 31 members of the Chūō Club and half of the Rikken Kokumintō) to join his new party.

The party survived Katsura's death in 1913, and under the leadership of Katō Takaaki placed five of its members in the Cabinet of Prime Minister Ōkuma Shigenobu in 1914–1916. It became the majority party in the Diet after the 1915 General Election, with a 153 seats.

After the dissolution of the Ōkuma government, the Dōshikai merged with Chūseikai and other small political parties to form the Kenseikai in October 1916.

== Election result ==
Election	Votes	%	Seats
1915	523,228	36.92	151 / 381
