= 1902 Japanese general election =

- 10 August 1902

All 376 seats in the House of Representatives 189 seats needed for a majority
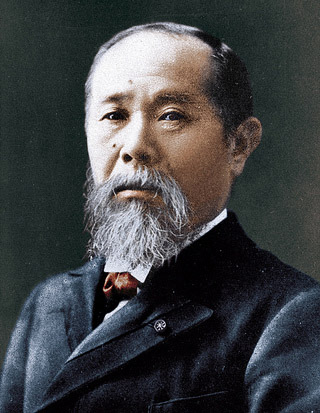

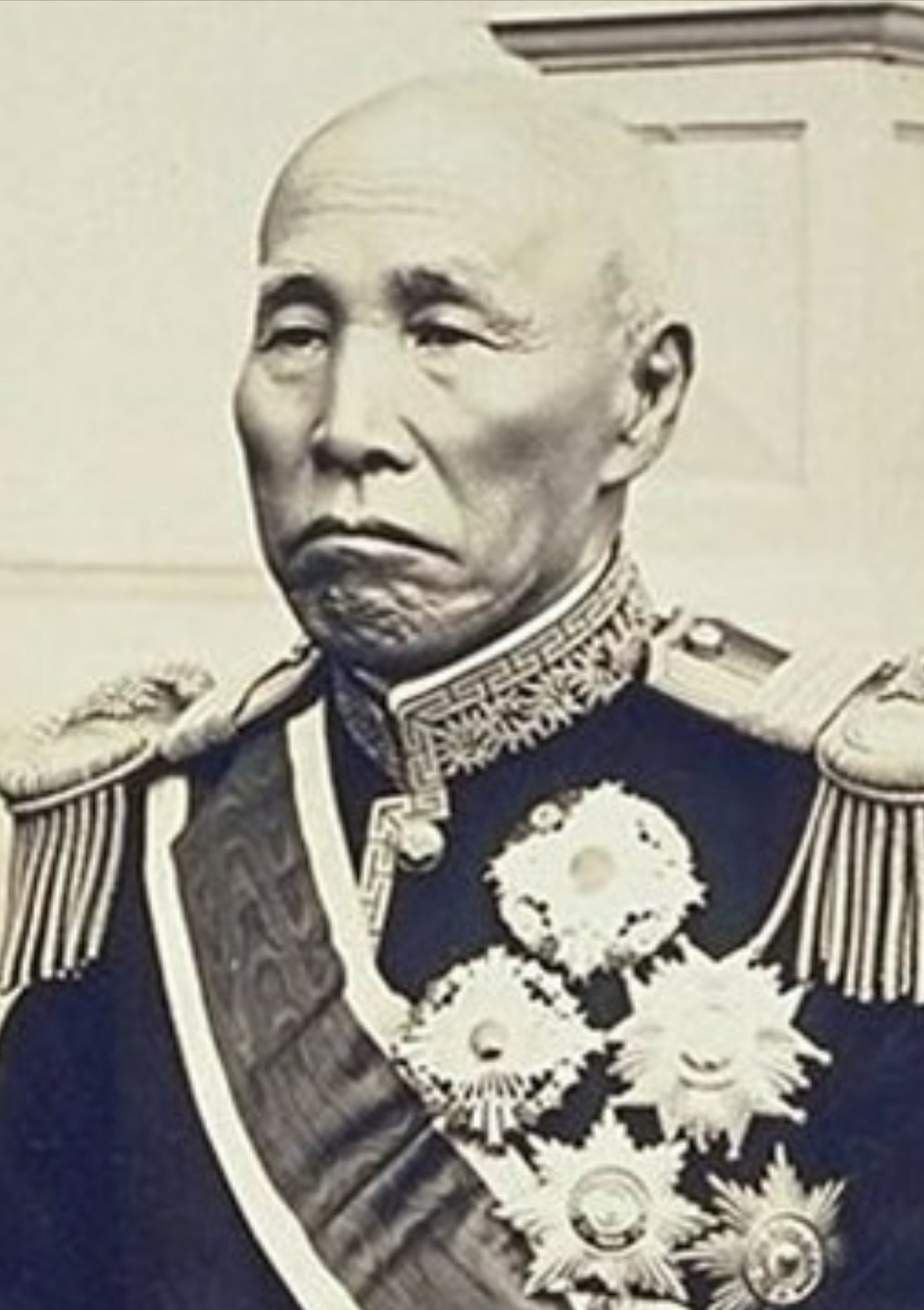
	First party	Second party
Leader	Itō Hirobumi	Ōkuma Shigenobu
Party	Rikken Seiyūkai	Kensei Hontō
Seats won	191	95
Popular vote	433,763	220,989
Percentage	50.40%	25.68%
Prime Minister before election
Katsura Tarō
Independent
Prime Minister after election
Katsura Tarō
Independent

General elections were held in Japan on 10 August 1902. The result was a victory for the Rikken Seiyūkai party, which won 191 of the 376 seats.

== Electoral system ==
Electoral reforms in 1900 had abolished the 253 single and two-member constituencies. The 376 members of the House of Representatives were now elected in 51 multi-member constituencies based on prefectures and cities.

Voting remained restricted to men aged over 25 who paid at least 10 yen a year in direct taxation, although 1900 electoral reforms had reduced the figure from 15 yen, increasing the proportion of the population able to vote from 1% to 2%.

== Results ==
Party	Votes	%	Seats	+/–
Rikken Seiyūkai	433,763	50.40	191	New
Kensei Hontō	220,989	25.68	95	New
Teikokutō	37,749	4.39	17	New
Jinin Kai	35,950	4.18	28	New
Dōshi Club	24,541	2.85	13	New
Others	107,678	12.51	32	–
Total	860,670	100.00	376	+76
Valid votes	860,670	99.07		
Invalid/blank votes	8,098	0.93		
Total votes	868,768	100.00		
Registered voters/turnout	982,868	88.39		
Source: Mackie & Rose, Voice Japan
