= 1904 Japanese general election =

- 1 March 1904

All 379 seats in the House of Representatives 190 seats needed for a majority
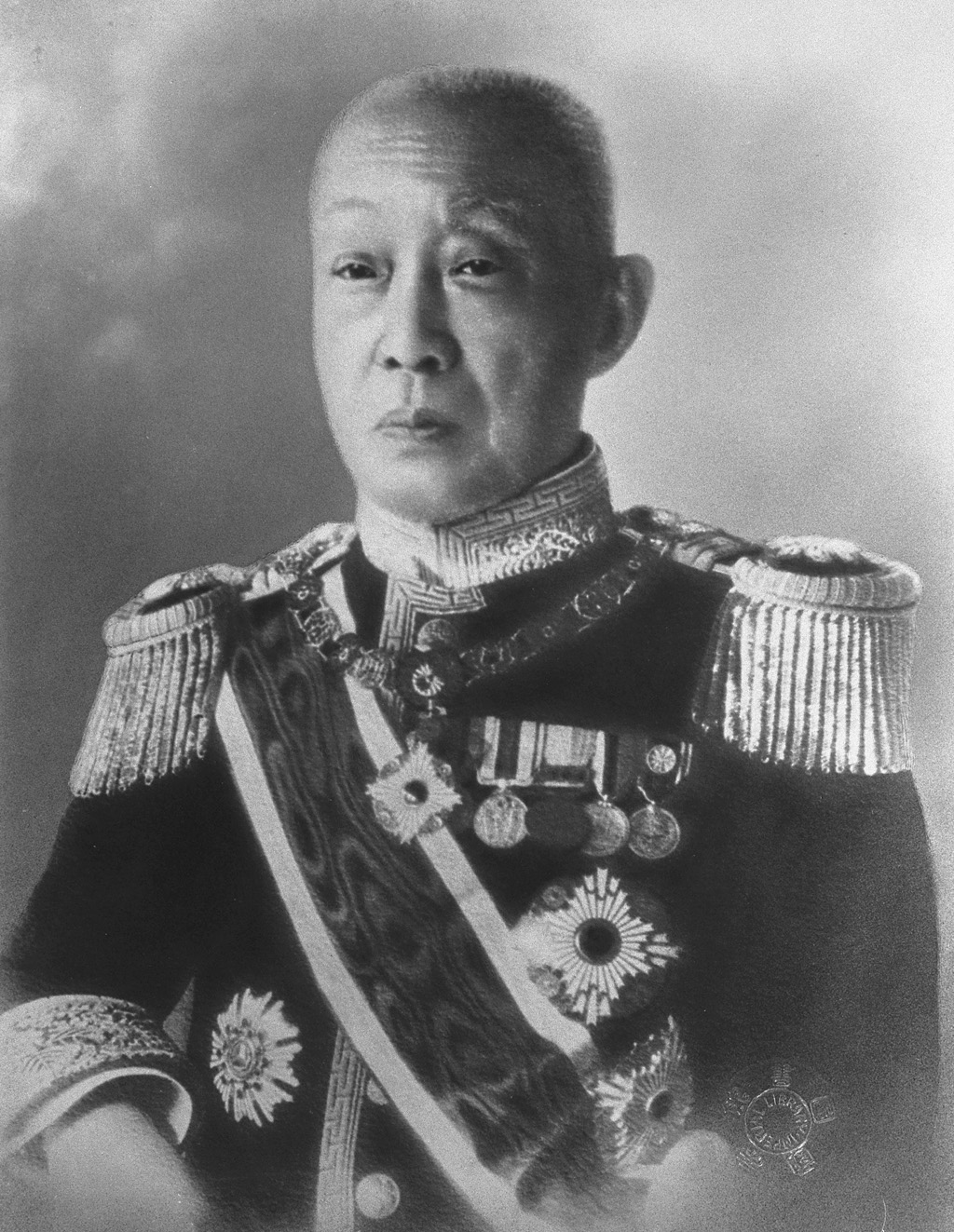

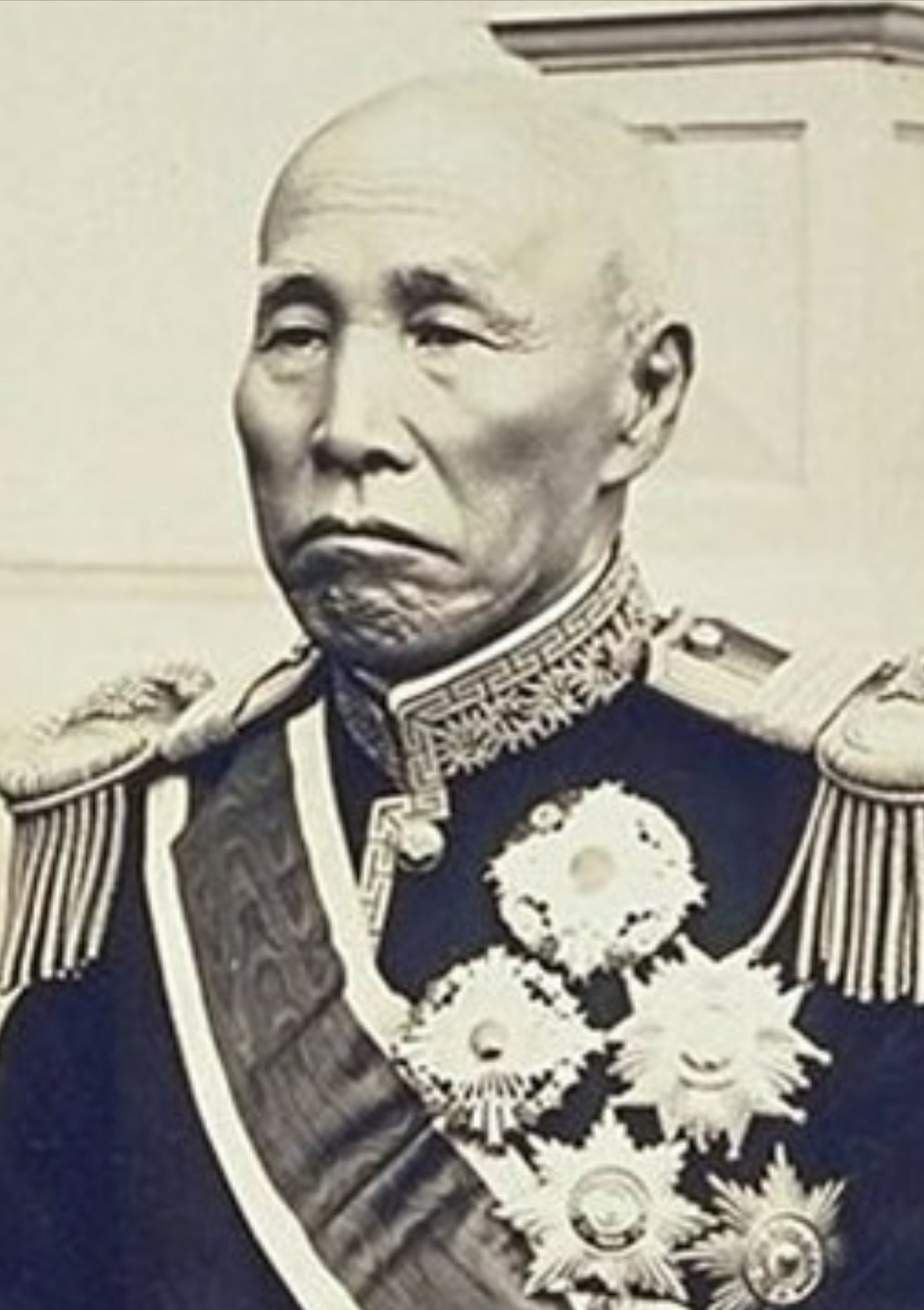

	First party	Second party	Third party
Leader	Saionji Kinmochi	Ōkuma Shigenobu
Party	Rikken Seiyūkai	Kensei Hontō	Kōshin Club
Last election	45.42%, 175 seats	26.63%, 85 seats	4.51%, 31 seats (Note: As Chūsei Club)
Seats won	133	90	39
Seat change	▼42	▲5	▲8
Popular vote	217,691	170,319	55,709
Percentage	33.47%	26.19%	8.57%
Swing	▼11.95pp	▼0.44pp	▲4.06pp
	Fourth party	Fifth party	Sixth party
Party	Jiyu Club	Mumei Club	Teikokutō
Seats won	18	25	19
Seat change	new	new	▲2
Popular vote	31,772	31,197	27,244
Percentage	4.89%	4.80%	4.19%
Prime Minister before election
Katsura Tarō
Independent
Prime Minister after election
Katsura Tarō
Independent

General elections were held in Japan on 1 March 1904. The Rikken Seiyūkai party remained the largest in the House of Representatives, winning 133 of the 379 seats.

== Electoral system ==
The 379 members of the House of Representatives were elected in 51 multi-member constituencies based on prefectures and cities. Voting was restricted to men aged over 25 who paid at least 10 yen a year in direct taxation.

== Results ==
Party	Votes	%	Seats	+/–
Rikken Seiyūkai	217,691	33.47	133	–42
Kensei Hontō	170,319	26.19	90	+5
Kōshin Club	55,709	8.57	39	+8
Jiyu Club	31,772	4.89	18	New
Mumei Club	31,197	4.80	25	New
Teikokutō	27,244	4.19	19	+2
Others	116,419	17.90	55	0
Total	650,351	100.00	379	+3
Valid votes	650,351	99.12		
Invalid/blank votes	5,777	0.88		
Total votes	656,128	100.00		
Registered voters/turnout	762,445	86.06		
Source: Mackie & Rose, Voice Japan
