= 1912 Japanese general election =

- 15 May 1912

All 381 seats in the House of Representatives 191 seats needed for a majority
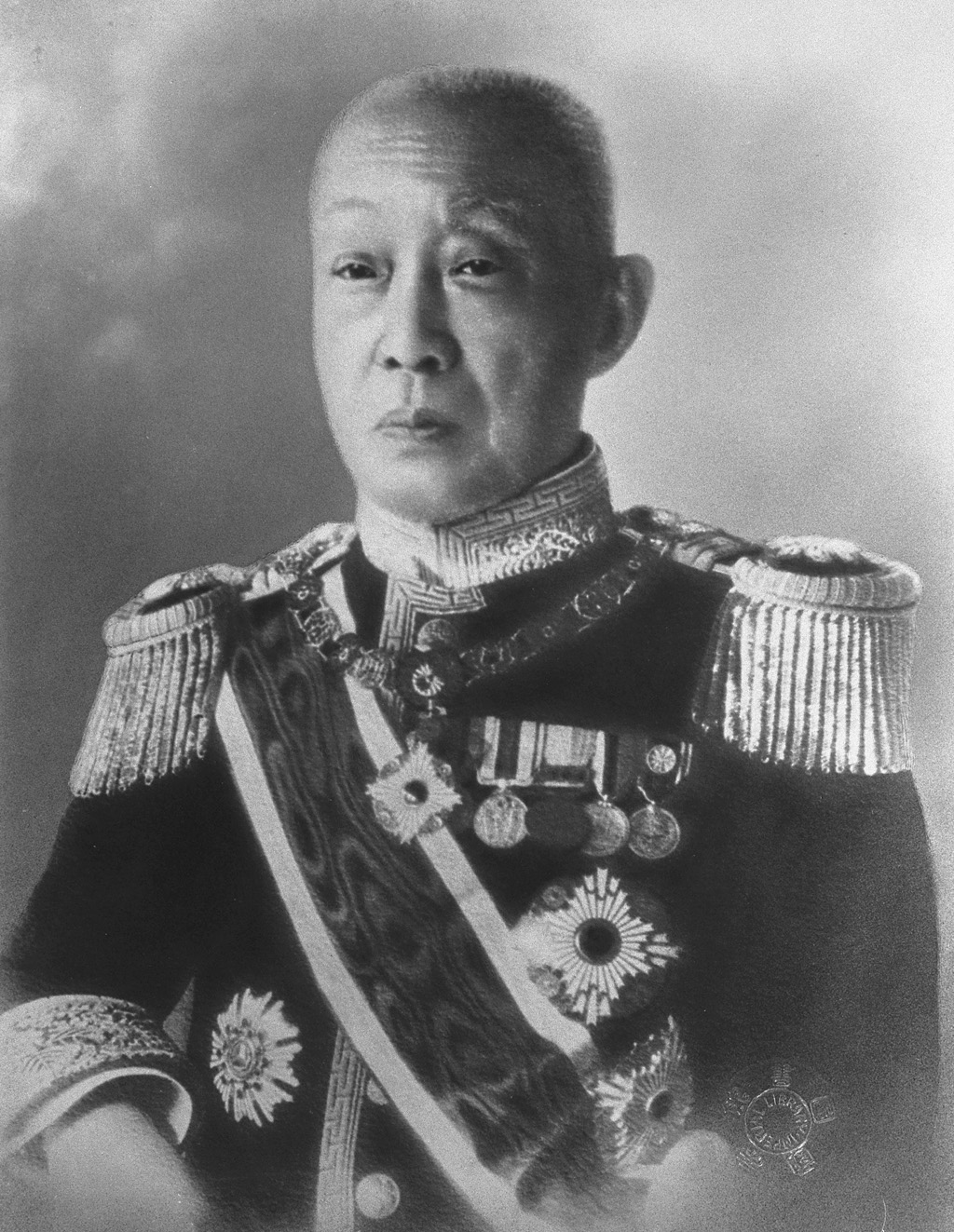

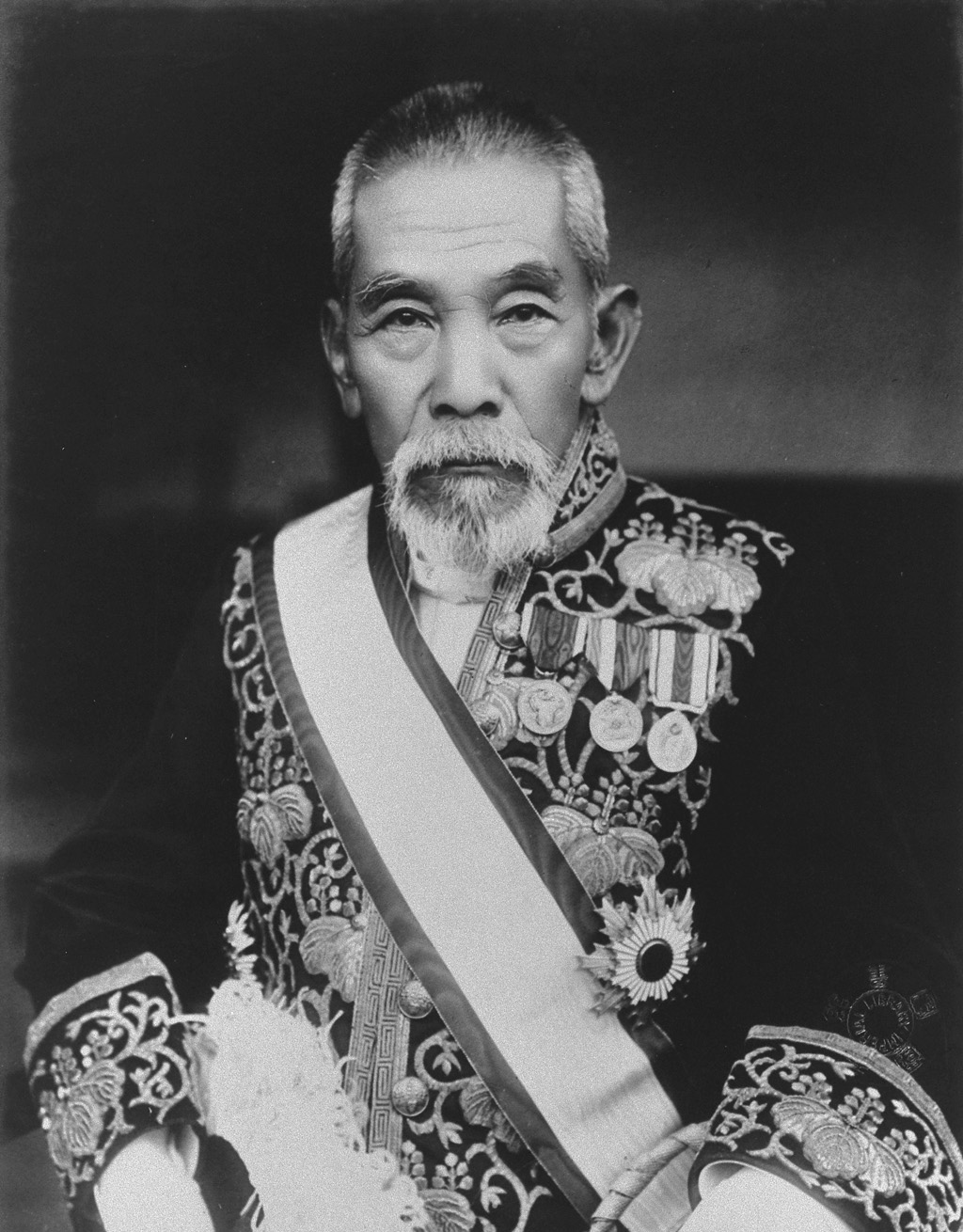

	First party	Second party	Third party
Leader	Saionji Kinmochi	Inukai Tsuyoshi
Party	Rikken Seiyūkai	Rikken Kokumintō	Chūō Club
Last election	48.40%, 187 seats	Did not exist	Did not exist
Seats won	209	95	31
Seat change	▲22	New	New
Popular vote	689,613	381,465	113,834
Percentage	51.52%	28.50%	8.50%
Swing	▲3.12pp	New	New
Prime Minister before election
Saionji Kinmochi
Rikken Seiyūkai
Elected Prime Minister
Saionji Kinmochi
Rikken Seiyūkai

General elections were held in Japan on 15 May 1912. The result was a victory for the Rikken Seiyūkai party, which won 209 of the 381 seats.

== Electoral system ==
The 381 members of the House of Representatives were elected in 51 multi-member constituencies based on prefectures and cities. Voting was restricted to men aged over 25 who paid at least 10 yen a year in direct taxation. 1912 was also the first year citizens in Okinawa could vote.

== Results ==
Party	Votes	%	Seats	+/–
Rikken Seiyūkai	689,613	51.52	209	+22
Rikken Kokumintō	381,465	28.50	95	New
Chūō Club	113,834	8.50	31	New
Others	153,593	11.47	46	–18
Total	1,338,505	100.00	381	+2
Valid votes	1,338,505	99.21		
Invalid/blank votes	10,672	0.79		
Total votes	1,349,177	100.00		
Registered voters/turnout	1,506,143	89.58		
Source: Mackie & Rose, Voice Japan
