= Ichirō Hatoyama Cabinet =

Ichirō Hatoyama Cabinet may refer to:

- First Ichirō Hatoyama Cabinet, the Japanese majority government led by Ichirō Hatoyama from 1954 to 1955
- Second Ichirō Hatoyama Cabinet, the Japanese majority government led by Ichirō Hatoyama in 1955
- Third Ichirō Hatoyama Cabinet, the Japanese majority government led by Ichirō Hatoyama from 1955 to 1956
