= Tokyo 10th district (1920–1924) =

Legislative district of Japan

Tokyo 10th district was a constituency of the House of Representatives in the Imperial Diet of Japan (national legislature) between 1920 and 1924. It was located in Tokyo prefecture and consisted of Tokyo City's Koishikawa ward. Its only representative was Hatoyama Ichirō, the son of former speaker of the House Hatoyama Kazuo.

In previous elections Koishikawa, like all wards of Tokyo city, had formed part of Tokyo Tokyo city district that elected eleven representatives by single non-transferable vote (SNTV). With the introduction of universal (male) suffrage and the return to SNTV voting, Koishikawa became part of Tokyo 2nd district.

== Election results ==
1920
Party	Candidate	Votes	%	±%
Rikken Seiyūkai	Hatoyama Ichirō	2,742		
Kenseikai	Matsui Kitsu (?)	1,617		
	Other candidates	56		

1924
Party	Candidate	Votes	%	±%
Seiyū Hontō	Hatoyama Ichirō	4,013		
Kakushin Club	Sasaki Yasugorō	3,168		
Kenseikai	Moriwaki Genzaburō	683		
	Other candidates	13		
