= Third Ichirō Hatoyama cabinet =

Cabinet of Japan (1955–1956)

Third Ichirō Hatoyama Cabinet
- 54th Cabinet of Japan

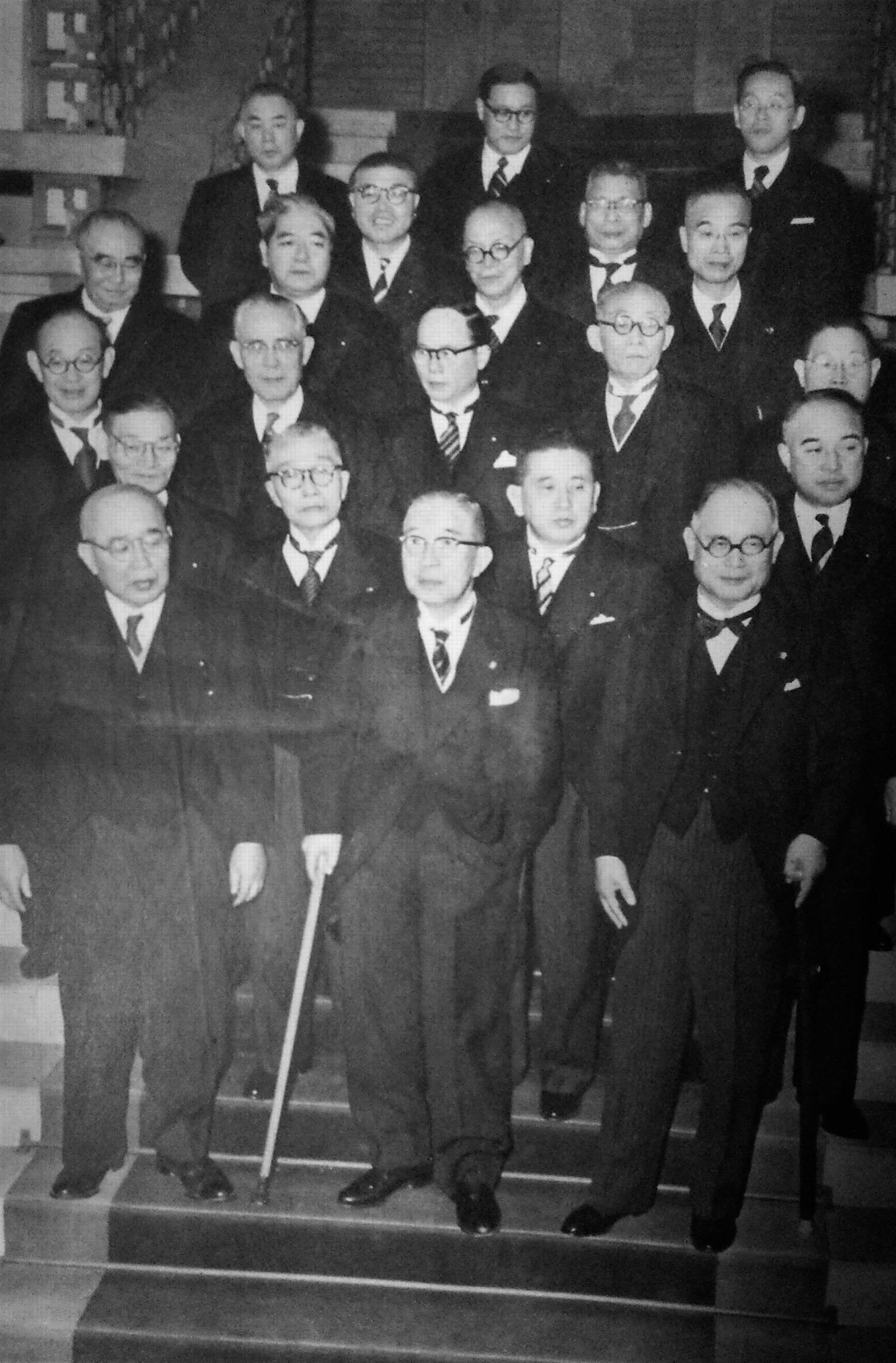
- Date formed: November 22, 1955
- Date dissolved: December 23, 1956

People and organisations
- Emperor: Shōwa
- Prime Minister: Ichirō Hatoyama
- Deputy Prime Minister: Mamoru Shigemitsu
- Member party: Liberal Democratic Party
- Status in legislature: House of Representatives: Majority; House of Councillors: Minority
- Opposition parties: Japan Socialist Party; Japanese Communist Party; Labourers and Farmers Party; Ryokufūkai

History
- Election: 1956 councillors election
- Legislature term: 23rd-26th National Diet
- Predecessor: Second Ichirō Hatoyama Cabinet
- Successor: Ishibashi Cabinet

The Third Ichirō Hatoyama Cabinet is the 54th Cabinet of Japan headed by Ichirō Hatoyama from November 22, 1955 to December 23, 1956.

== Cabinet ==
Portfolio	Name	Political party	Term start	Term end
Prime Minister	Ichirō Hatoyama	Liberal Democratic	November 22, 1955	December 23, 1956
Deputy Prime Minister Minister for Foreign Affairs	Mamoru Shigemitsu	Liberal Democratic	November 22, 1955	December 23, 1956
Minister of Justice	Ryōzō Makino	Liberal Democratic	November 22, 1955	December 23, 1956
Minister of Finance	Hisato Ichimada	Liberal Democratic	November 22, 1955	December 23, 1956
Minister of Education	Ichirō Kiyose	Liberal Democratic	November 22, 1955	December 23, 1956
Minister of Health	Eizō Kobayashi	Liberal Democratic	November 22, 1955	December 23, 1956
Minister of Agriculture, Forestry and Fisheries; Director of the Administrative Management Agency	Ichirō Kōno	Liberal Democratic	November 22, 1955	December 23, 1956
Minister of International Trade and Industry	Tanzan Ishibashi	Liberal Democratic	November 22, 1955	December 23, 1956
Minister of Transport	Shinji Yoshino	Liberal Democratic	November 22, 1955	December 23, 1956
Minister of Posts	Isamu Murakami	Liberal Democratic	November 22, 1955	December 23, 1956
Minister of Labor	Tadao Kuraishi	Liberal Democratic	November 22, 1955	December 23, 1956
Minister of Construction	Motoharu Baba	Liberal Democratic	November 22, 1955	December 23, 1956
Director of the Defense Agency	Naka Funada	Liberal Democratic	November 22, 1955	December 23, 1956
Chairman of the National Public Safety Commission	Tadao Ōasa	Liberal Democratic	November 22, 1955	December 23, 1956
Director of the Economic Planning Agency	Tatsunosuke Takasaki	Liberal Democratic	November 22, 1955	December 23, 1956
Director of the Local Government Agency	Masataka Ōta	Liberal Democratic	November 22, 1955	December 23, 1956
Director of the Hokkaido Regional Development Agency	Matsutarō Shōriki	Liberal Democratic	November 22, 1955	December 23, 1956
Chairman of the Atomic Energy Commission	Matsutarō Shōriki	Liberal Democratic	January 1, 1956	December 23, 1956
Director of the Science and Technology Agency	Matsutarō Shōriki	Liberal Democratic	May 19, 1956	December 23, 1956
Chairman of the National Capital Region Development Commission	Motoharu Baba	Liberal Democratic	June 9, 1956	December 23, 1956
Chief Cabinet Secretary	Ryūtarō Nemoto	Liberal Democratic	November 22, 1955	December 23, 1956
Director-General of the Cabinet Legislation Bureau	Shūzō Hayashi	Independent	November 22, 1955	December 23, 1956
Deputy Chief Cabinet Secretary (Political Affairs)	Takizō Matsumoto	Liberal Democratic	November 22, 1955	December 23, 1956
Deputy Chief Cabinet Secretary (General Affairs)	Eiichi Tanaka	Independent	November 22, 1955	December 23, 1956
