= Jōtarō =

- Gender: Male
- Language: Japanese

Origin
- Origin: Japan

Jōtarō is a male Japanese given name.

== People ==
- Yamamoto Jōtarō (山本 条太郎; 1867–1936), Japanese politician and entrepreneur
- Jōtarō Kawakami, Japanese socialist politician
- Jotaro Saito, Japanese kimono designer
- Jotaro Senba (born 1937), Japanese actor
- Jotaro Watanabe (渡辺 錠太郎; 1874–1936), Japanese General in the second World War

== Characters ==
- Jotaro Honma (本間 丈太郎), a character in Black Jack
- Jotaro Kujo (空条 承太郎), a character in JoJo's Bizarre Adventure and the main protagonist of the third part, Stardust Crusaders
- Jotaro Nagao, a character in Ring
- Jotaro (Usagi Yojimbo), a character in Usagi Yojimbo
- Jotaro, a character in Musashi
- Jotaro Kaga (加賀 城太郎) (a.k.a. "Bleed Kaga"), a character in Future GPX Cyber Formula
- Jotaro Zaizen (財前 丈太郎), a character from Government Crime Investigation Agent Zaizen Jotaro
- Jotaro Shobo, a minor character in Cyberpunk 2077
