= Seiyu (disambiguation) =

Seiyū (声優) is the Japanese word for voice actor.

Seiyu may also refer to:

- Seiyu Group, a Japanese group of supermarkets, shopping centers and department stores.
- Rikken Seiyūkai, known simply as Seiyūkai, a Japanese political party during the pre-war Empire of Japan.
- Seiyūhontō (True Seiyū Party), a Japanese political party during the pre-war Empire of Japan that broke away from the Rikken Seiyūkai.
- Seiyu, a music artist in the 2020s Underground Rap scene.
