= Chūsei Club =

Political party in Japan

The Chūsei Club (Japanese: 中正倶楽部, Chūsei Kurabu) was a pro-business political party in Japan.

== History ==
The party was established by a group of 42 MPs in May 1924 following the May elections; 28 were first-time MPs and the remaining 14 were re-elected MPs, including some who had been members of the Koshin Club.

In May 1925 talks were held about a merger with Rikken Seiyūkai and the Kakushin Club. Although a merger did not happen, the Chūsei Club was dissolved when twenty of its MPs joined with the Reformist Club to form the Shinsei Club, eleven joined Rikken Seiyūkai and the remaining one became an independent.
