= Ichirō Kiyose =

Japanese politician (1884-1967)

- 清瀬 一郎
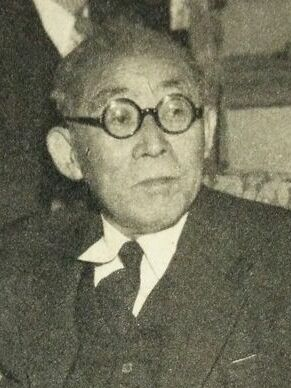
- Ichirō Kiyose in 1953

Speaker of the House of Representatives
- In office 1 February 1960 – 23 October 1963
- Monarch: Hirohito
- Deputy: Takaichi Nakamura; Tsurumatsu Kubota; Kenzaburo Hara
- Preceded by: Ryōgorō Katō
- Succeeded by: Naka Funada

Minister of Education
- In office 22 November 1955 – 23 December 1956
- Prime Minister: Ichirō Hatoyama
- Preceded by: Kenzō Matsumura
- Succeeded by: Hirokichi Nadao

Vice Speaker of the House of Representatives
- In office 20 April 1928 – 21 January 1930
- Speaker: Motoda Hajime; Kawahara Mosuke; Horikiri Zenbee
- Preceded by: Matsuura Gobee
- Succeeded by: Shōju Koyama

Member of the House of Representatives
- In office 28 February 1955 – 27 June 1967
- Preceded by: Tsukasa Ōkami
- Succeeded by: Yoshiyuki Arai
- Constituency: Hyōgo 4th
- In office 2 October 1952 – 14 March 1953
- Preceded by: Kinoshita Sakae
- Succeeded by: Seidō Ōnishi
- Constituency: Hyōgo 4th
- In office 11 May 1920 – 18 December 1945
- Preceded by: Constituency established
- Succeeded by: Constituency abolished
- Constituency: Osaka 3rd (1920–1928); Hyōgo 4th (1928–1945)

Personal details
- Born: 5 July 1884 Shikama, Hyōgo, Japan
- Died: 27 June 1967 (aged 82)
- Party: Liberal Democratic (1955–1967)
- Other political affiliations: CNP (1920–1922); Kakushin Club (1922–1925); Independent (1925–1927); Kakushintō (1927–1932); Kokumin Dōmei (1932–1940); IRAA (1940–1945); JPP (1945–1946); Kaishintō (1952–1954); JDP (1954–1955)
- Education: Kyoto Imperial University

Ichirō Kiyose (清瀬 一郎, Kiyose Ichirō; July 5, 1884 – June 27, 1967) was a Japanese lawyer and politician who rose to serve as Minister of Education and later Speaker of the House of Representatives in the National Diet. As a lawyer, he rose to fame in Japan as one of the defense attorneys for the perpetrators of the May 15 Incident in 1932, and then later became famous internationally when he defended former prime minister Hideki Tōjō during the Tokyo War Crimes Trials after World War II. In 1960, as Speaker of the House of Representatives, he presided over the ramming through the Diet of the U.S.-Japan Security Treaty that cemented in place the U.S.-Japan alliance and allows the United States to maintain military bases on Japanese soil.

== Early life and education ==
Kiyose was born in Yumesaki Village, Shikama District, Hyōgo (present-day Himeiji city) on July 5, 1884. After graduating from Kyoto Imperial University with a degree in law, he became a lawyer who specialized in tenancy disputes and patent law.

== Political career ==
In 1920, Kiyose was elected to the National Diet as a member of the House of Representatives representing Hyōgo Prefecture's fourth district. Originally a liberal, Kiyose supported the 1925 Universal Manhood Suffrage Law (普通選挙法, Futsū Senkyo Hō) which gave voting rights to all males aged 25 or over, but opposed the draconian Peace Preservation Law that accompanied it for allowing too much judicial discretion and thereby creating the possibility for abuse.

However, by the 1930s, Kiyose evidenced a pronounced turn toward nationalism, conservatism, and militarism, as evidenced by his volunteering for the defense of the perpetrators of the May 15 Incident in 1932.

After Japan's defeat in World War II, Kiyose was purged by the U.S. Occupation and expelled from parliament for his pro-military stance during the war. In the late 1940s, he became internationally famous as the lead defense attorney former prime minister Hideki Tōjō during the Tokyo War Crimes Trials. Having been rendered homeless by American air raids, Kiyose conducted the trial while living in a homeless shelter and had to go door to door begging for donations to fund the costs of mounting Tōjō's defense.

In 1952, Kiyose was depurged and immediately won reelection to the Diet. However, rather than return to his liberal ways of the 1920s, he retained his image as an arch-conservative by vocally advocating revision of Japan's postwar constitution to restore aspects of the prewar system.

Kiyose served as Minister of Education in the cabinet of Prime Minister Ichirō Hatoyama from 1955 to 1956. As Minister, Kiyose lamented that Japan's postwar education system did not do enough to instill patriotism in Japan's youth, and pursued policies that would make Japanese education more openly nationalistic.

By 1960, Kiyose had risen to become Speaker of the House of Representatives. When Kiyose became Speaker of the House, he resigned from the Liberal Democratic Party and governed as an independent, "for the sake of fairness." This was not typical for Japanese speakers of the House, but rather was Kiyose's personal habit, as he had similarly resigned his membership in the Kakushintō party after being appointed Deputy Speaker of the House following the 1928 general election.

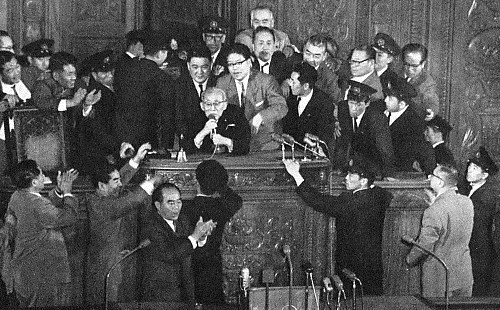
A scrum at the rostrum of the National Diet, as Japan Socialist Party Diet members attempt to prevent Speaker of the Lower House Ichirō Kiyose from calling for a vote on extending the Diet Session, while being restrained by police officers, May 19, 1960

Kiyose once again garnered international attention in 1960 when, as Speaker of the House, he presided over the ramming through the Diet of the U.S.-Japan Security Treaty, helping spark a dramatic escalation in the Anpo protests against the Treaty. Despite his supposedly neutral status, Kiyose cooperated with conservative prime minister Nobusuke Kishi in calling for a surprise snap vote on the Treaty on May 19, 1960, in what became known as the "May 19 Incident." When opposition Japan Socialist Party Diet members barricaded Kiyose in his office in an attempt to prevent him from calling a snap vote on the Treaty, Kiyose took the drastic step of summoning 500 police officers into the Diet and having the opposition lawmakers physically dragged out of the building. He then struggled his way to the rostrum amidst the scrum with the assistance of the police officers and gaveled the vote through with only members of the conservative Liberal Democratic Party present. As a result of these seemingly undemocratic actions, the Anpo protests surged to a massive scale in June 1960, ultimately forcing the resignation of the Kishi cabinet, although the Treaty did take effect on June 23.

== Death ==
Kiyose died on June 27, 1967. That same day, he was posthumously awarded the Order of the Rising Sun with Paulownia Flowers.

Political offices
| Preceded by Ryōgorō Katō | Speaker of the House of Representatives; 1960–1963 | Succeeded by Naka Funada |
| Preceded by Kenzō Matsumura | Minister of Education; 1955–1956 | Succeeded by Hirokichi Nadao |
