= Eikichi Araki =

Japanese businessman and central banker

- 新木 栄吉

17th & 19th Governor of the Bank of Japan
- In office October 1945 – June 1946
- Prime Minister: Kijuro Shidehara; Shigeru Yoshida
- Preceded by: Keizo Shibusawa
- Succeeded by: Hisato Ichimada
- In office December 1954 – November 1956
- Prime Minister: Ichiro Hatoyama
- Preceded by: Hisato Ichimada
- Succeeded by: Masamichi Yamagiwa

Japanese Ambassador to the United States
- In office June 1952 – December 1953
- Preceded by: Occupation of Japan
- Succeeded by: Sadao Iguchi

Personal details
- Born: April 24, 1891 Ishikawa, Japan
- Died: February 1, 1959 (aged 67)
- Education: Tokyo Imperial University

Eikichi Araki (新木 栄吉, Araki Eikichi; April 24, 1891 – February 1, 1959) was a Japanese businessman and a central banker. He was the 17th and 19th Governor of the Bank of Japan (BOJ).

== Early life ==
Araki was born in Ishikawa Prefecture, Japan.

== Career ==
Araki was Governor of the Bank of Japan from October 9, 1945 to June 1, 1946 and again from December 11, 1954 to November 30, 1956. He also served as the Japanese Ambassador to the United States from 1952 until 1953.

== Notes ==
Government offices
| Preceded by Keizo Shibusawa | Governor of the Bank of Japan (1st term); 1945–1946 | Succeeded by Hisato Ichimada |
| Preceded by Hisato Ichimada | Governor of the Bank of Japan (2nd term); 1954–1956 | Succeeded by Masamichi Yamagiwa |
Diplomatic posts
| Occupation of Japan | Japanese Ambassador to the United States; 1952–1953 | Succeeded by Sadao Iguchi |
