= Keizo Shibusawa =

Japanese businessman, philanthropist and folklorist

Viscount Keizō Shibusawa
- 渋沢 敬三

Minister of Finance
- In office 9 October 1945 – 22 May 1946
- Prime Minister: Kijūrō Shidehara
- Preceded by: Juichi Tsushima
- Succeeded by: Tanzan Ishibashi

16th Governor of the Bank of Japan
- In office 18 March 1944 – 9 October 1945
- Prime Minister: Hideki Tojo; Kuniaki Koiso; Kantaro Suzuki; Naruhiko Higashikuni
- Preceded by: Toyotarō Yūki
- Succeeded by: Eikichi Araki

Member of the House of Peers
- In office 17 March 1945 – 10 June 1946 Nominated by the Emperor

Personal details
- Born: 25 August 1896 Kōtō, Tokyo, Japan
- Died: 25 October 1963 (aged 67) Minato, Tokyo, Japan
- Party: Independent
- Relatives: Shibusawa Eiichi (grandfather); Hozumi Nobushige (uncle); Sakatani Yoshirō (uncle); Kiuchi Jūshirō (father-in-law)
- Education: Tokyo Imperial University

Viscount Keizō Shibusawa (渋沢 敬三, Shibusawa Keizō; 25 August 1896 – 25 October 1963) was a Japanese businessman, central banker, politician, philanthropist, and folklorist. He served as the 16th Governor of the Bank of Japan and later as Minister of Finance in the immediate postwar government of Kijūrō Shidehara.

== Early life ==
Shibusawa was born in Tokyo into a prominent family. He was the grandson of Shibusawa Eiichi, a noted industrialist and economic reformer.

== Career ==
Shibusawa served as Governor of the Bank of Japan from 18 March 1944 to 9 October 1945. He resigned from the post to become Minister of Finance in October 1945, under the cabinet of Prime Minister Kijūrō Shidehara.

During his tenure as finance minister, Shibusawa oversaw initial steps toward the dissolution of the zaibatsu, Japan's large industrial and financial conglomerates, as part of postwar economic reforms.

Beyond finance and politics, Shibusawa was also known for his contributions to cultural preservation and academia. He was instrumental in forming the core ethnographic collections of what later became the National Museum of Ethnology in Osaka.

== See also ==
- Shibusawa Eiichi

== Notes ==
Political offices
Preceded by Juichi Tsushima	Minister of Finance; 1945–1946	Succeeded by Tanzan Ishibashi
Government offices
Preceded by Toyotarō Yūki	Governor of the Bank of Japan; 1944–1945	Succeeded by Eikichi Araki (1st term)
