= Tokyo 2nd district (1928–1942) =

Legislative district of Japan

Tokyo 2nd district was a constituency of the House of Representatives in the Imperial Diet of Japan (national legislature). Between 1928 and 1942 it elected five representatives by single non-transferable vote (SNTV). It was located in Tokyo Prefecture and consisted of Tokyo City's Kanda, Koishikawa, Hongō and Shitaya wards. It was most notably represented by Christian socialist leader Isoo Abe, between 1926 and 1931 chairman of the Socialist Mass Party (Shakai Minshūtō), and post-war prime minister Ichirō Hatoyama who founded the Liberal Party in 1945, the Japan Democratic Party in 1954 and chaired the Liberal Democratic Party after the "conservative merger" of the two parties in 1955.

After the 1946 redistricting the area became part of the limited voting 1st district that comprised the eastern half of the former city of Tokyo.

== Elected representatives ==
Election year	Highest vote (top tōsen)	2nd	3rd	4th	5th
1928	Yadanji Nakajima (Rikken Minseitō)	Ichirō Hatoyama (Rikken Seiyūkai)	Isoo Abe (Shakai Minshūtō)	Genkichi Yano (Rikken Seiyūkai)	Tatsuo Kodaki (Rikken Minseitō)
1930	Yadanji Nakajima (Rikken Minseitō)	Gorō Akatsuka (Rikken Minseitō)	Takeru Inukai (Rikken Seiyūkai)	Ichirō Hatoyama (Rikken Seiyūkai)	Hideomi Takahashi (Rikken Minseitō)
1932	Takeru Inukai (Rikken Seiyūkai)	Jōji Imai (Rikken Minseitō)	Ichirō Hatoyama (Rikken Seiyūkai)	Isoo Abe (Shakai Minshūtō)	Yadanji Nakajima (Rikken Minseitō)
1936	Isoo Abe (Shakai Taishūtō)	Yadanji Nakajima (Rikken Minseitō)	Ichirō Hatoyama (Rikken Seiyūkai)	Jōji Imai (Rikken Minseitō)	Takaichi Nagano (Rikken Minseitō)
1937	Isoo Abe (Shakai Taishūtō)	Ichirō Hatoyama (Rikken Seiyūkai)	Yadanji Nakajima (Rikken Minseitō)	Jōji Imai (Rikken Minseitō)	Takaichi Nagano (Rikken Minseitō)
1942	Ichirō Hatoyama (Ex-Seiyūkai Independent)	Yadanji Nakajima (Yokusan Seijitaisei Kyōgikai)	Takaichi Nagano (Yokusan Seijitaisei Kyōgikai)	Jōji Imai (Yokusan Seijitaisei Kyōgikai)	Toshi Kawaguchi (Yokusan Seijitaisei Kyōgikai)
