= Kakushintō =

Kakushintō 革新党
- Leader: Seki Naohiko
- Founded: 3 June 1927
- Dissolved: 25 July 1932
- Preceded by: Kakushin Club
- Succeeded by: Kokumin Dōmei

The Kakushintō (Japanese: 革新党, "Reformist Party") was a political party in Japan.

== History ==
The party was established on 3 June 1927 by a group of National Diet members from the Shinsei Club, all of whom had previously been members of the Kakushin Club. Ozaki Yukio and Seki Naohiko were elected as leaders of the party, assuming the title "Advisor" (Japanese: 顧問). Ozaki, however, soon resigned from the party. The party nominated 15 candidates for the 1928 general elections, winning three seats. In April one of its members, Ichirō Kiyose, left the party after being appointed Deputy Speaker of the House of Representatives. It won three seats again in the 1930 elections, but was reduced to two seats in the February 1932 elections. It was subsequently dissolved on 25 July that year.

== Election results ==
Election	Votes	%	Seats	+/–
1928	81,324	0.83	3 / 466	Steady
1930	55,487	0.53	3 / 466	Steady
1932	36,839	0.38	2 / 466	▼1
