= Second Ichirō Hatoyama cabinet =

Cabinet of Japan (March-November 1955)

Second Ichirō Hatoyama Cabinet
- 53rd Cabinet of Japan

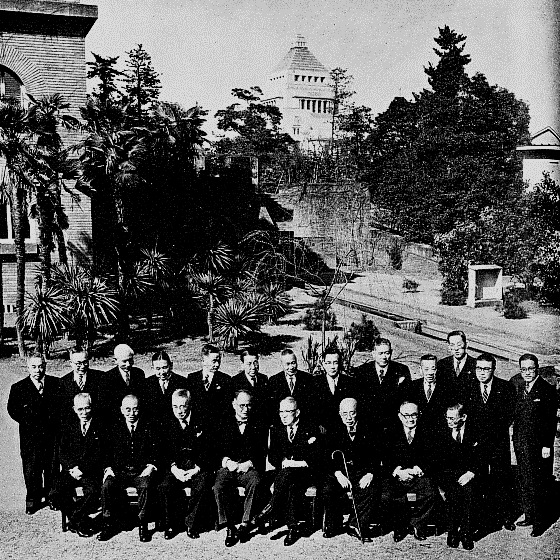
- Date formed: March 19, 1955
- Date dissolved: November 22, 1955

People and organisations
- Emperor: Shōwa
- Prime Minister: Ichirō Hatoyama
- Deputy Prime Minister: Mamoru Shigemitsu
- Member party: Democratic Party
- Status in legislature: House of Representatives: Minority; House of Councillors: Minority
- Opposition parties: Liberal Party; Leftist Socialist Party of Japan; Rightist Socialist Party of Japan; Japanese Communist Party; Labourers and Farmers Party; Ryokufūkai

History
- Election: 1955 general election
- Legislature term: 22nd National Diet
- Predecessor: First Ichirō Hatoyama Cabinet
- Successor: Third Ichirō Hatoyama Cabinet

The Second Ichirō Hatoyama Cabinet is the 53rd Cabinet of Japan headed by Ichirō Hatoyama from March 19 to November 22, 1955.

== Cabinet ==
Portfolio	Name	Political party	Term start	Term end
Prime Minister	Ichirō Hatoyama	Democratic	March 19, 1955	November 22, 1955
Deputy Prime Minister; Minister for Foreign Affairs	Mamoru Shigemitsu	Democratic	March 19, 1955	November 22, 1955
Minister of Justice	Shirō Hanamura	Democratic	March 19, 1955	November 22, 1955
Minister of Finance	Hisato Ichimada	Democratic	March 19, 1955	November 22, 1955
Minister of Education	Kenzō Matsumura	Democratic	March 19, 1955	November 22, 1955
Minister of Health	Hideji Kawasaki	Democratic	March 19, 1955	November 22, 1955
Minister of Agriculture, Forestry and Fisheries	Ichirō Kōno	Democratic	March 19, 1955	November 22, 1955
Minister of International Trade and Industry	Tanzan Ishibashi	Democratic	March 19, 1955	November 22, 1955
Minister of Transport	Takeo Miki	Democratic	March 19, 1955	November 22, 1955
Minister of Posts	Takechiyo Matsuda	Democratic	March 19, 1955	November 22, 1955
Minister of Labor	Takao Nishida	Democratic	March 19, 1955	November 22, 1955
Minister of Construction	Yūtarō Takeyama	Democratic	March 19, 1955	November 22, 1955
Chairman of the National Public Safety Commission	Tadao Ōasa	Democratic	March 19, 1955	November 22, 1955
Director of the Administrative Management Agency; Director of the Autonomy Agency	Shōjirō Kawashima	Democratic	March 19, 1955	November 22, 1955
Director of the Hokkaido Development Agency	Tomejirō Ōkubo	Democratic	March 19, 1955	November 22, 1955
Director of the Defense Agency	Arata Sugihara	Democratic	March 19, 1955	July 31, 1955
Director of the Defense Agency	Shigemasa Sunada	Democratic	July 31, 1955	November 22, 1955
Director of the Economic Deliberation Agency	Tatsunosuke Takasaki	Democratic	March 19, 1955	July 20, 1955
Director of the Economic Planning Agency	Tatsunosuke Takasaki	Democratic	July 20, 1955	November 22, 1955
Chief Cabinet Secretary	Ryūtarō Nemoto	Democratic	March 19, 1955	November 22, 1955
Director-General of the Cabinet Legislation Bureau	Shūzō Hayashi	Independent	March 19, 1955	November 22, 1955
Deputy Chief Cabinet Secretary (Political Affairs)	Takizō Matsumoto	Democratic	March 19, 1955	November 22, 1955
Deputy Chief Cabinet Secretary (General Affairs)	Eiichi Tanaka	Independent	March 19, 1955	November 22, 1955
