= Juichi Tsushima =

Japanese politician

- 津島 壽一
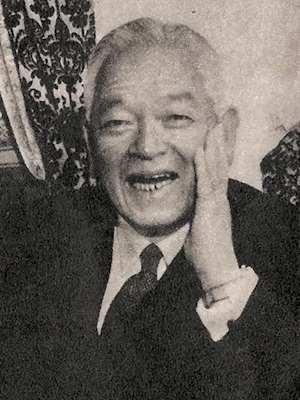
- Tsushima in 1953

Director-General of the Japan Defense Agency
- In office 10 July 1957 – 12 June 1958
- Prime Minister: Nobusuke Kishi
- Preceded by: Akira Kodaki
- Succeeded by: Gisen Satō

Minister of Finance
- In office 17 August 1945 – 9 October 1945
- Prime Minister: Naruhiko Higashikuni
- Preceded by: Toyosaku Hirose
- Succeeded by: Keizo Shibusawa
- In office 21 February 1945 – 7 April 1945
- Prime Minister: Kuniaki Koiso
- Preceded by: Sōtarō Ishiwata
- Succeeded by: Toyosaku Hirose

Member of the House of Councillors
- In office 3 May 1953 – 1 June 1965
- Preceded by: Multi-member district
- Succeeded by: Tan Maekawa
- Constituency: National district (1953–1959); Kagawa at-large (1959–1965)

Member of the House of Peers
- In office 5 October 1945 – 16 February 1946 Nominated by the Emperor

Personal details
- Born: 1 January 1888 Sakaide, Kagawa, Japan
- Died: 7 February 1967 (aged 79)
- Party: Liberal Democratic
- Other political affiliations: Liberal (1953–1955)
- Education: Tokyo Imperial University

Juichi Tsushima (Japanese: 津島壽一) (1888–1967) was the 7th President of the Japanese Olympic Committee (1959–1962). He was a graduate of the Tokyo Imperial University. From 1957 to 1958 he was Director General of the Japan Defense Agency.

Political offices
| Preceded by Sōtarō Ishiwata | Minister of Finance; 1945 | Succeeded by Toyosaku Hirose |
| Preceded by Toyosaku Hirose | Minister of Finance; 1945 | Succeeded by Keizo Shibusawa |
| Preceded by Akira Kodaki | Director-General of the Japan Defense Agency; 1957–1958 | Succeeded by Gisen Satō |
Sporting positions
| Preceded by Kaoru Iwamoto | Director of the Japan Go Association (Nihon Ki-in); 1949–1951 | Succeeded by Tadashi Adachi |
| Preceded by Nobuaki Makino | President of the Japan Go Association (Nihon Ki-in); 1955–1967 | Succeeded by Tadashi Adachi |
| Preceded by Ryotaro Azuma | President of the Japanese Amateur Athletic Association; 1959–1962 | Succeeded by Mitsujirō Ishii |
| Preceded by Ryotaro Azuma | President of the Japanese Olympic Committee; 1959–1962 | Succeeded by Prince Tsuneyoshi Takeda |
