= Hatomander =

Proposed Japanese electoral reform

Japan Socialist Party members marching in a demonstration, holding up placards opposing the single-seat constituency system. From the right at the front of the demonstration are Inejirō Asanuma, Jōtarō Kawakami, and Mosaburō Suzuki.

The Hatomander (ハトマンダー, hatomandā; a portmanteau of Hatoyama and Gerrymander) was an electoral reform proposed in the 1950s by Japanese prime minister Ichirō Hatoyama and his third cabinet. His plan was to replace the SNTV multi-member constituencies for the House of Representatives (usually called chū-senkyo-ku, "medium electoral districts", in Japanese) entirely with first-past-the-post single-member districts (shō-senkyo-ku, "small electoral districts"). The change would have made it easier for Hatoyama's Liberal Democratic Party (LDP) to gain a two-thirds majority on its own, enabling him to pursue his plan to change the Japanese Constitution, particularly Article 9. The plan faced strong opposition led by the Japanese Socialist Party (JSP) that accused Hatoyama of wanting to "hatomander" the electoral districts to his needs. An electoral reform bill was presented to the Diet in March 1956, passed the House of Representatives in May 1956, but was not voted on in the House of Councillors in a still ongoing debate at the end of the Diet session. The LDP failed to win a majority in the House of Councillors election in July, and the plan was shelved.

A second attempt to introduce "small" electoral districts, but this time under a parallel voting system with proportional representation, was made by LDP president and prime minister Kakuei Tanaka in 1973. The left still opposed the plan fiercely – this time its opponents called it the Kakumander (カクマンダー, kakumandā). Even the LDP couldn't fully agree on a reform bill, so it never came to a vote in the Diet. A third drive for single-member districts under LDP president and prime minister Toshiki Kaifu in 1991, again under a parallel voting system, sometimes referred to as the Kaimander, already faced strong opposition within the LDP and didn't succeed. Some, among them LDP secretary general Ichirō Ozawa, also argued for the original "Hatomander" consisting exclusively of single-member districts.

During the ultimately successful debate over electoral reform in the 1990s, parts of the JSP remained opposed to the introduction of single-member districts creating friction in the anti-LDP multi-party coalition under Morihiro Hosokawa. An electoral reform bill was eventually launched in 1994 that – unlike the original "Hatomander" plan – also introduced a parallel voting system in which about a third of seats are filled by proportional representation. The breakaway New Socialist Party, a splinter group of five leftist Socialist members of parliament who left the JSP in 1996 when it renamed itself the Social Democratic Party (SDP), remained strictly opposed to the new single-member districts.

The SDP, unlike the JSP a minor party, the Japanese Communist Party (JCP) and Kōmeitō have lost most of their district seats following the electoral reform to the LDP and the Democratic Party (DPJ) that emerged as the second major party from the party realignments of the 1990s. In 2009, the SDP won three district seats in an electoral cooperation with the DPJ, Kōmeitō and JCP only won proportional seats. While the new electoral system produced two strong parties (at least, until 2012), the parallel voting system ensured that the smaller parties in parliament were not completely eliminated as the original Hatomander plan had intended.

Post 2012, after the fall of the DPJ, the parallel voting system may have instead influenced fragmentation of anti-LDP parties, while still over-representing larger parties.
