= Yoshiyuki Arai =

Japanese politician (1934–2017)

- 新井 彬之

Member of the House of Representatives
- In office 27 December 1969 – 24 January 1990
- Preceded by: Ichirō Kiyose
- Succeeded by: Shigeru Gotō
- Constituency: Hyōgo 4th

Personal details
- Born: 15 September 1934 Haibara, Shizuoka, Japan
- Died: 7 March 2017 (aged 82) Himeji, Hyōgo, Japan
- Party: Kōmeitō
- Education: Kansai University

Yoshiyuki Arai (Japanese: 新井彬之; 15 September 1934 – 7 March 2017) was a Japanese politician.

Born in Shizuoka Prefecture, Yoshiyuki represented Hyōgo 4th district in the House of Representatives as a member of the Kōmeitō Party from 1969 to 1990, when he chose not to stand in that year's elections. He died of lung cancer in Himeji, Hyōgo on 7 March 2017, at the age of 82.
