= First Ichirō Hatoyama cabinet =

Cabinet of Japan (1954–1955)

First Ichirō Hatoyama Cabinet
- 52nd Cabinet of Japan

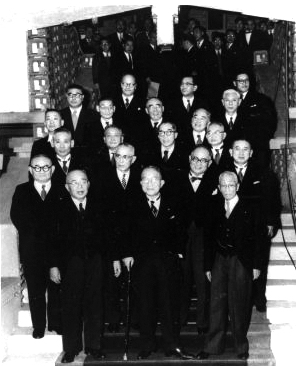
- Date formed: December 10, 1954
- Date dissolved: March 19, 1955

People and organisations
- Emperor: Shōwa
- Prime Minister: Ichirō Hatoyama
- Deputy Prime Minister: Mamoru Shigemitsu
- Member party: Democratic Party
- Status in legislature: House of Representatives: Minority; House of Councillors: Minority
- Opposition parties: Liberal Party; Leftist Socialist Party of Japan; Rightist Socialist Party of Japan; Japanese Communist Party; Labourers and Farmers Party; Ryokufūkai

History
- Legislature term: 21st-22nd National Diet
- Predecessor: Fifth Yoshida Cabinet
- Successor: Second Ichirō Hatoyama Cabinet

The First Ichirō Hatoyama Cabinet was the 52nd Cabinet of Japan. It was headed by Ichirō Hatoyama from December 10, 1954 to March 19, 1955.

== Cabinet ==
| Portfolio | Name | Political party | Term start | Term end |
|---|---|---|---|---|
| Prime Minister | Ichirō Hatoyama | Democratic | December 10, 1954 | March 19, 1955 |
| Deputy Prime Minister; Minister for Foreign Affairs | Mamoru Shigemitsu | Democratic | December 10, 1954 | March 19, 1955 |
| Minister of Justice | Shirō Hanamura | Democratic | December 10, 1954 | March 19, 1955 |
| Minister of Finance | Hisato Ichimada | Democratic | December 10, 1954 | March 19, 1955 |
| Minister of Education | Masazumi Andō | Democratic | December 10, 1954 | March 19, 1955 |
| Minister of Health | Yūsuke Tsurumi | Democratic | December 10, 1954 | March 19, 1955 |
| Minister of Agriculture, Forestry and Fisheries | Ichirō Kōno | Democratic | December 10, 1954 | March 19, 1955 |
| Minister of International Trade and Industry | Tanzan Ishibashi | Democratic | December 10, 1954 | March 19, 1955 |
| Minister of Transport | Takeo Miki | Democratic | December 10, 1954 | March 19, 1955 |
| Minister of Posts | Yūki Takechi | Democratic | December 10, 1954 | March 19, 1955 |
| Minister of Labor | Saburō Chiba | Democratic | December 10, 1954 | March 19, 1955 |
| Minister of Construction | Yūtarō Takeyama | Democratic | December 10, 1954 | March 19, 1955 |
| Chair of the National Public Safety Commission | Tadao Ōasa | Democratic | December 10, 1954 | March 19, 1955 |
| Director of the Administrative Management Agency; Director of the Autonomy Agency | Takao Nishida | Democratic | December 10, 1954 | March 19, 1955 |
| Director of the Hokkaido Development Agency | Hideyuki Miyoshi | Democratic | December 10, 1954 | March 19, 1955 |
| Director of the Defense Agency | Seiichi Ōmura | Democratic | December 10, 1954 | March 19, 1955 |
| Director of the Economic Deliberation Agency | Tatsunosuke Takasaki | Democratic | December 10, 1954 | March 19, 1955 |
| Chief Cabinet Secretary | Ryūtarō Nemoto | Democratic | December 10, 1954 | March 19, 1955 |
| Director-General of the Cabinet Legislation Bureau | Shūzō Hayashi | Independent | December 11, 1954 | March 19, 1955 |
| Deputy Chief Cabinet Secretary | Takizō Matsumoto | Democratic | December 10, 1954 | March 19, 1955 |
| Deputy Chief Cabinet Secretary | Takuichi Inoue | Independent | December 10, 1954 | March 19, 1955 |
| Deputy Chief Cabinet Secretary | Eiichi Tanaka | Independent | January 28, 1955 | March 19, 1955 |
