= 1956 Japanese House of Councillors election =

- 8 July 1956

127 of the 250 seats in the House of Councillors 126 seats needed for a majority
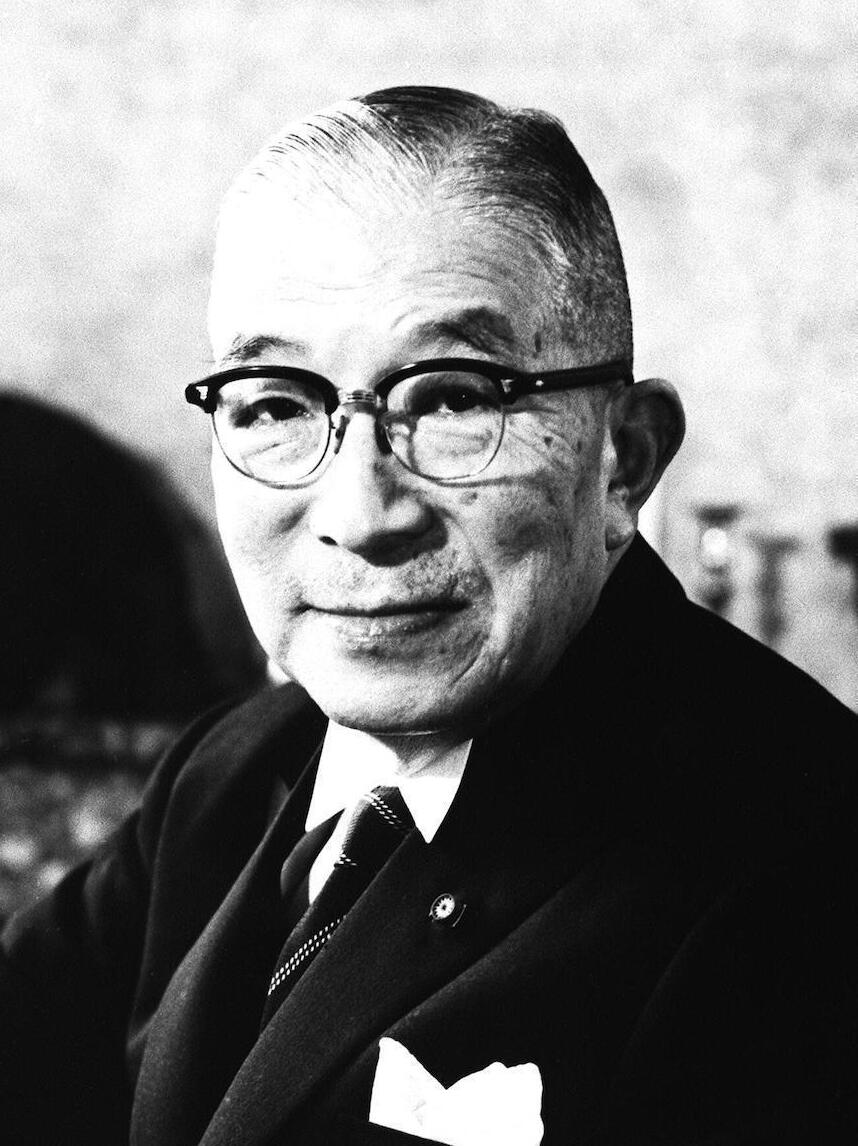

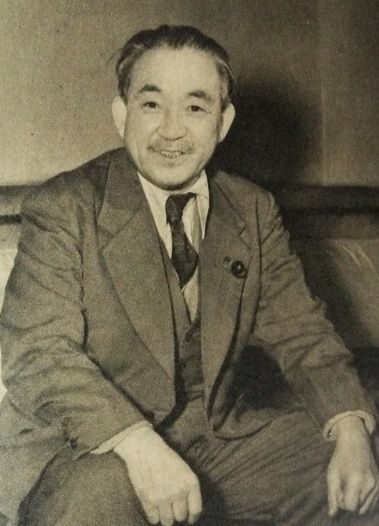

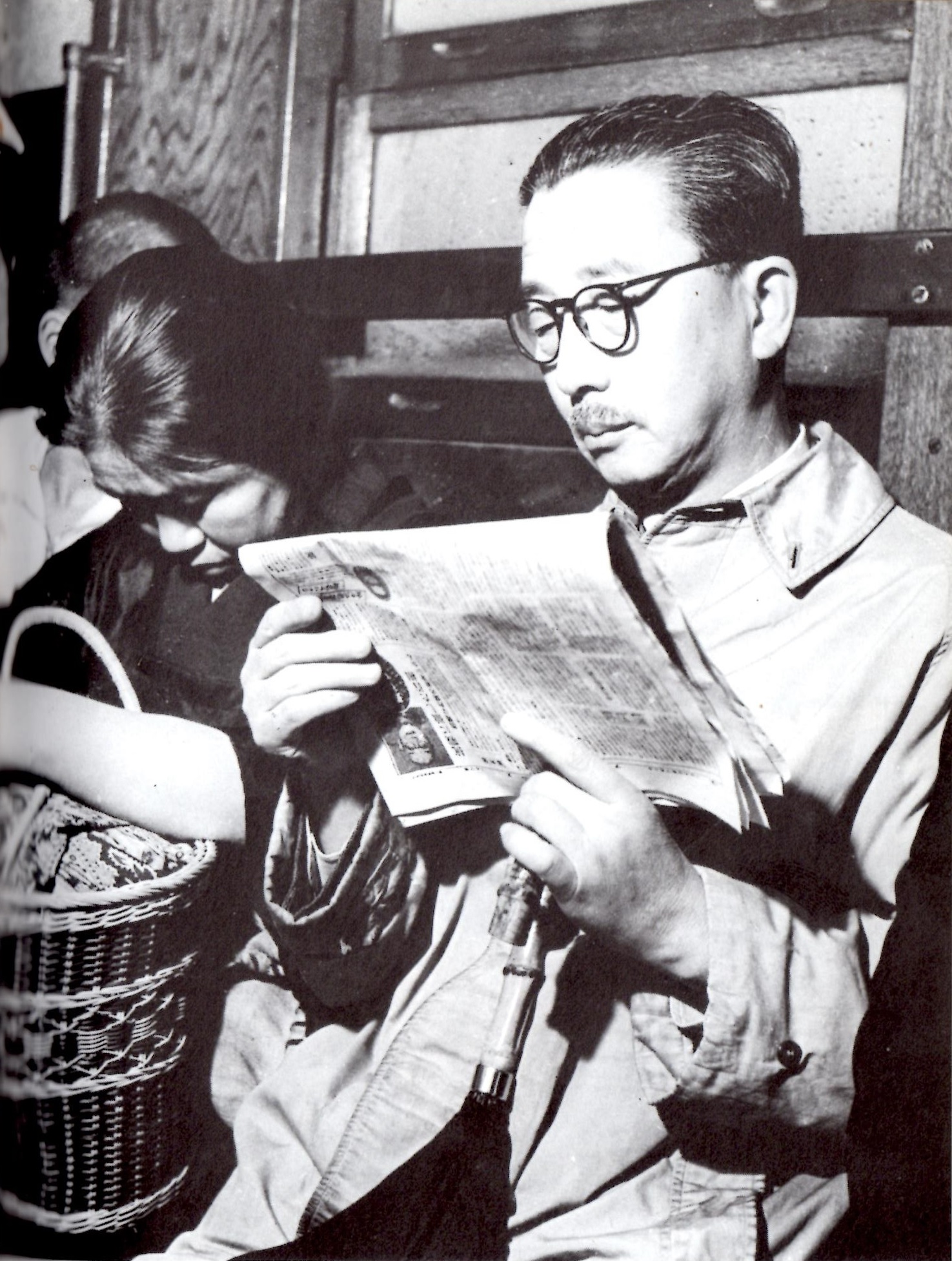
	First party	Second party
Leader	Ichirō Hatoyama	Mosaburō Suzuki
Party	LDP	Socialist
Seats after	122	80
Seat change	▲12	▲14
Popular vote	11,356,874	8,549,940
Percentage	36.7%	29.9%
Swing	N/A	N/A
	Third party	Fourth party
Leader		Sanzō Nosaka
Party	Ryokufūkai	JCP
Seats after	31	2
Seat change	▼3	▲2
Popular vote	2,877,102	599,254
Percentage	10.1%	2.1%
Swing	▼2.1pp	▲1.0pp
- Results of the election, showing the winning candidates in each prefecture and the national block.
President of the House of Councillors before election
Yūzō Shigemune
LDP
President of the House of Councillors-designate
Yutaka Terao
LDP

House of Councillors elections were held in Japan on 8 July 1956, electing half the seats in the House plus two vacant seats in the other half. The Liberal Democratic Party won the most seats, but failed to win a majority. It was the first national election under the 1955 System, approximately a two party system of Ichirō Hatoyama's Liberal Democratic Party (LDP) that was created in the "conservative merger" of 1955 and Suzuki Mosaburō's reunified Japan Socialist Party (JSP). The later dominant LDP failed to win a majority.

A key campaign issue was Prime Minister Ichirō Hatoyama's plan to revise Article 9 of the constitution – any change of the constitution requires a two-thirds majority in both chambers of the Diet. The left parties aimed to win at least a third of seats to prevent any constitutional change. Another issue was the government's plan to replace the elected prefectural boards of education with appointed ones, a plan fiercely opposed by the left: In June 1956, on the LDP's request the police intervened in the "deliberations" in the Diet when Socialist Councillors resorted to violence.

== Results ==
Two by-elections for the class of Councillors elected in 1953 were held simultaneously: The candidates with the 51st and 52nd highest vote shares in the national vote (one Socialist and one Liberal Democrat) were elected for three-year terms. Takenaka Tsuneo, who was elected as a member of the Japan Dentists' Federation, later joined the LDP.

Party	National			Constituency			Seats			
Party	Votes	%	Seats	Votes	%	Seats	Not up	Won	Total after	+/–
Liberal Democratic Party	11,356,874	39.69	19	14,353,960	48.35	42	61	61	122	New
Japan Socialist Party	8,549,940	29.88	21	11,156,060	37.58	28	31	49	80	New
Ryokufūkai	2,877,102	10.05	5	653,843	2.20	0	26	5	31	–3
Japanese Communist Party	599,254	2.09	1	1,149,009	3.87	1	0	2	2	+1
Labourers and Farmers Party	181,524	0.63	0	120,414	0.41	0	0	0	0	–2
Other parties	607,832	2.12	1	115,862	0.39	0	0	1	1	0
Independents	4,443,886	15.53	5	2,136,498	7.20	4	5	9	14	–22
Total	28,616,412	100.00	52	29,685,646	100.00	75	123	127	250	0
Valid votes	28,616,412	91.83		29,685,646	95.25					
Invalid/blank votes	2,545,797	8.17		1,479,521	4.75					
Total votes	31,162,209	100.00		31,165,167	100.00					
Registered voters/turnout	50,177,888	62.10		50,177,888	62.11					
Source: Ministry of Internal Affairs and Communications, National Diet

=== By constituency ===
Prefecture	Total seats	Seats won					
Prefecture	Total seats	LDP	JSP	Ryokufūkai	JCP	Others	Ind.
Aichi	3	2	1				
Akita	1		1				
Aomori	1	1					
Chiba	2	1	1				
Ehime	1	1					
Fukui	1	1					
Fukuoka	3	1	2				
Fukushima	2	1	1				
Gifu	1	1					
Gunma	2	1	1				
Hiroshima	2	1	1				
Hokkaido	4	2	2				
Hyōgo	3	2	1				
Ibaraki	2	1	1				
Ishikawa	1	1					
Iwate	1						1
Kagawa	1	1					
Kagoshima	2	1	1				
Kanagawa	2		2				
Kōchi	1		1				
Kumamoto	2		1				1
Kyoto	2	1	1				
Mie	1	1					
Miyagi	1	1					
Miyazaki	1	1					
Nagano	2	1	1				
Nagasaki	1	1					
Nara	1	1					
Niigata	2	1	1				
Ōita	1	1					
Okayama	2	1	1				
Osaka	3	1	1				1
Saga	1						1
Saitama	2	2					
Shiga	1	1					
Shimane	1	1					
Shizuoka	2	1	1				
Tochigi	2	1	1				
Tokushima	1	1					
Tokyo	4	1	2		1		
Tottori	1	1					
Toyama	1	1					
Wakayama	1	1					
Yamagata	1		1				
Yamaguchi	1		1				
Yamanashi	1	1					
National	52	19	21	5	1	1	5
Total	127	61	49	5	2	1	9

== See also ==
- Hatomander
