= 1932 Japanese general election =

- 20 February 1932

All 466 seats in the House of Representatives 234 seats needed for a majority
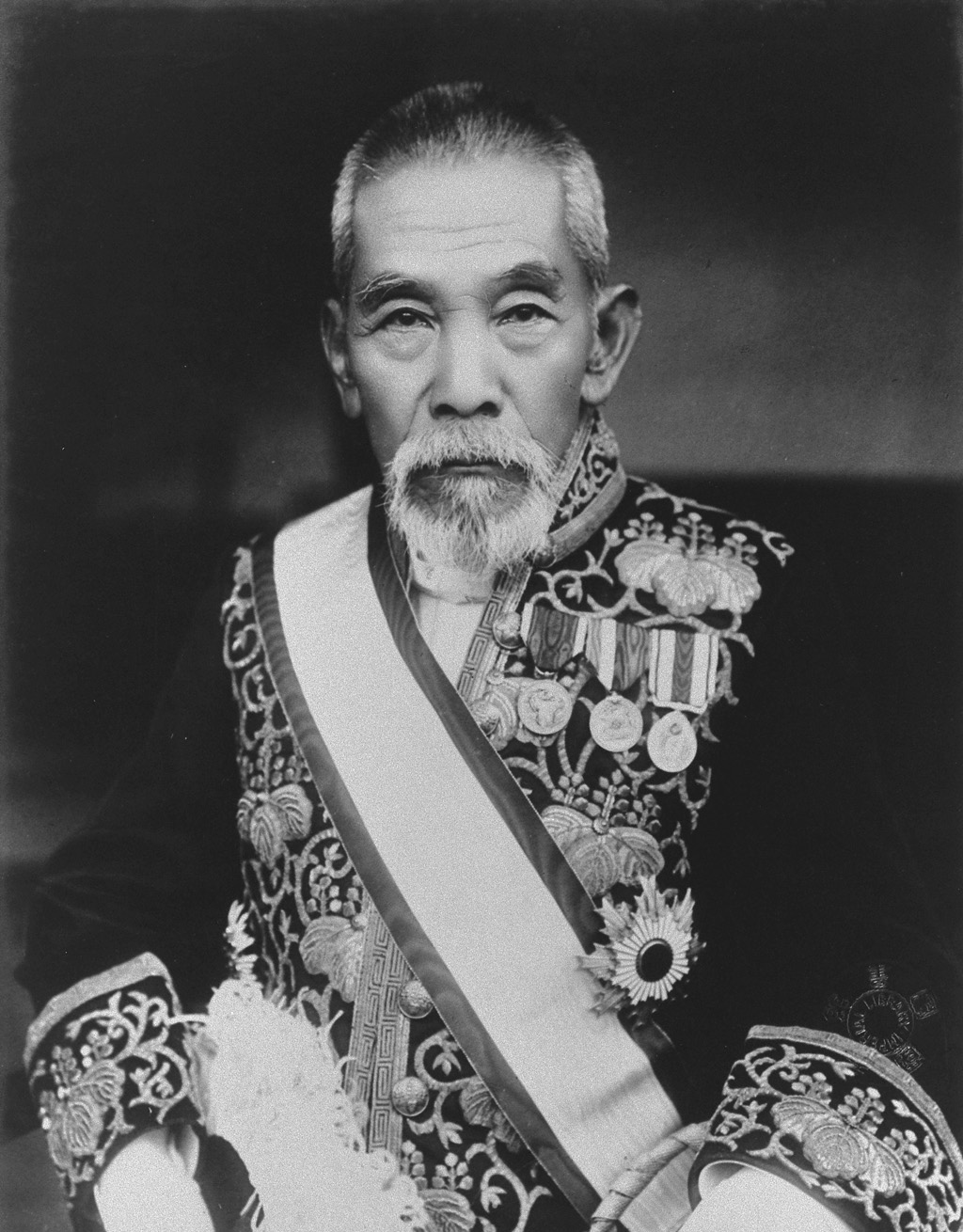

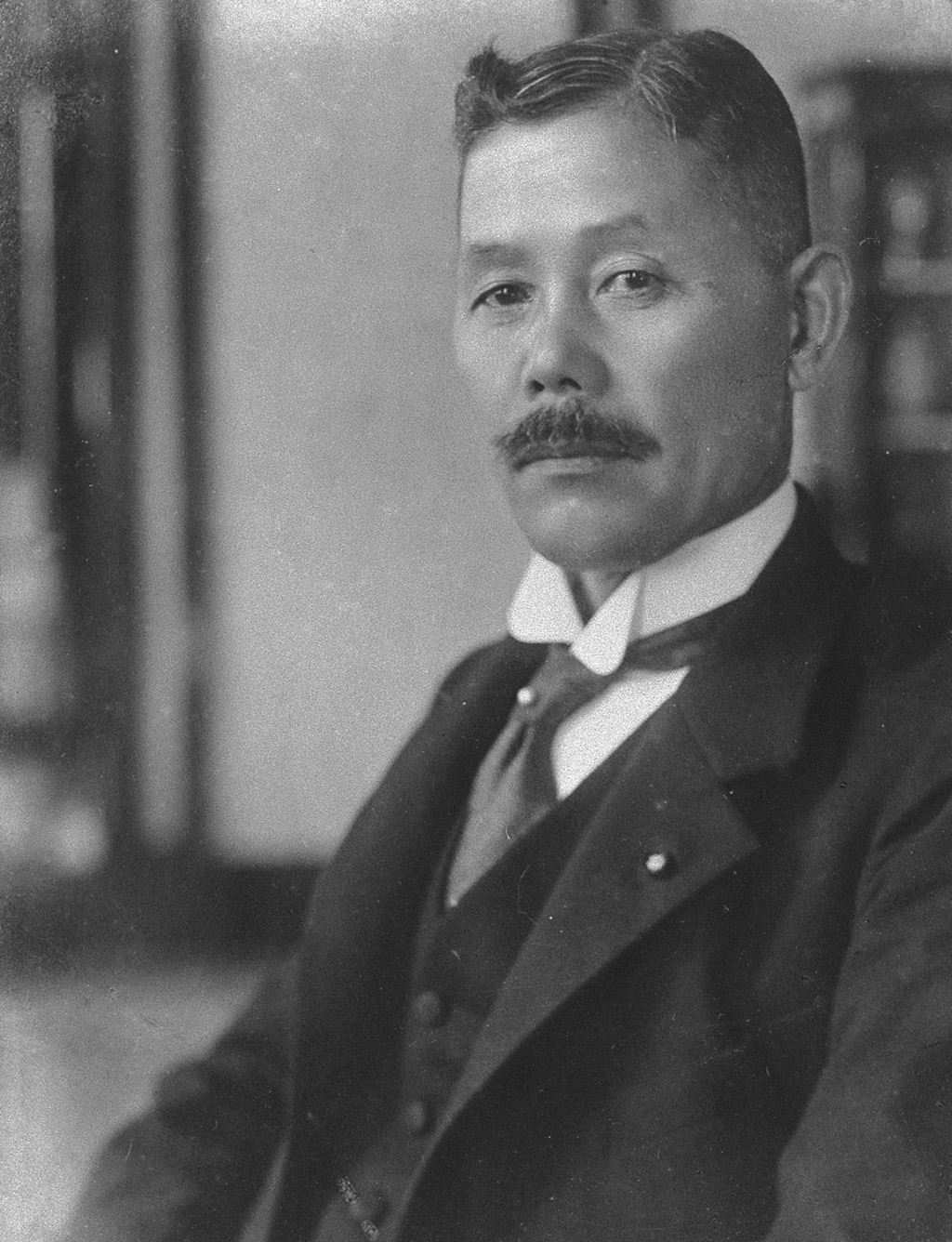

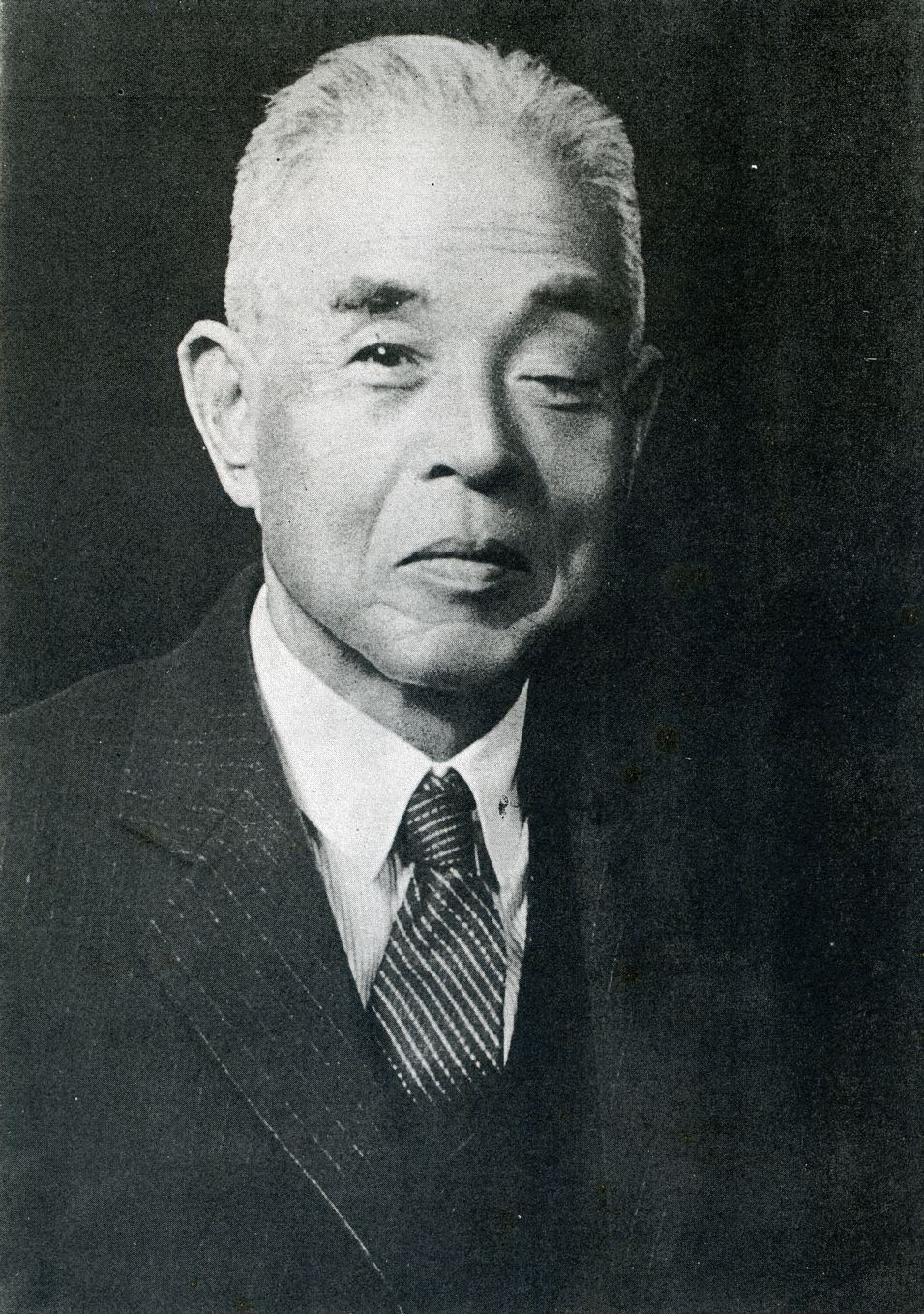

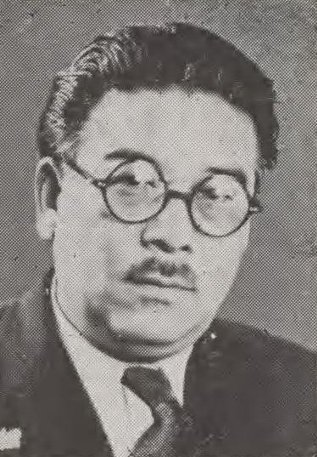
	First party	Second party	Third party
Leader	Tsuyoshi Inukai	Reijiro Wakatsuki	Abe Isoo
Party	Rikken Seiyūkai	Rikken Minseitō	Shakai Minshūtō
Last election	37.69%, 174 seats	52.48%, 273 seats	1.67%, 2 seats
Seats won	301	146 seats	3
Seat change	▲127	▼127	▲1
Popular vote	5,683,137	3,442,326	125,758
Percentage	58.20%	35.25%	1.29%
Swing	▲20.51pp	▼17.23pp	▼0.38pp
	Fourth party	Fifth party
		KST
Leader	Asō Hisashi
Party	Rōnō Taishūtō	Kakushintō
Last election	–	0.53%, 3 seats
Seats won	2	2
Seat change	New party	▼1
Popular vote	127,459	36,839
Percentage	1.31%	0.38%
Swing	New party	▼0.15pp
- Districts shaded according to winners' vote strength
Prime Minister before election
Tsuyoshi Inukai
Rikken Seiyūkai
Prime Minister after election
Tsuyoshi Inukai
Rikken Seiyūkai

General elections were held in Japan on 20 February 1932. They were the last elections before the May 15 Incident, which marked the temporary end of party politics in Japan. Rikken Seiyūkai won 301 of the 466 seats in the House of Representatives.

== Background ==
In 1931, the ruling Rikken Minseitō opposed the Mukden Incident, which was engineered by the military. The anti-war Foreign Minister Kijuro Shidehara and Prime Minister Wakatsuki Reijirō were criticized for their intervention in military and was accused of "serious corruption". After the resignation of the Reijirō Cabinet, some right-wing members of the ruling party formed a coalition with the opposition Rikken Seiyūkai and elected Inukai Tsuyoshi as prime minister.

Before the elections, some businessmen and candidates were assassinated by the right-wing.

== Results ==
Despite assassinations of anti-war politicians, Rikken Minseitō was unpopular because of its mishandling of the economic crisis. The ruling right-wing Rikken Seiyūkai led by Prime Minister Inukai Tsuyoshi won a landslide victory.

Party	Votes	%	Seats	+/–
Rikken Seiyūkai	5,683,137	58.20	301	+127
Rikken Minseitō	3,442,326	35.25	146	–127
Social Democratic Party	125,758	1.29	3	+1
Rōnō Taishūtō	127,459	1.31	2	New
Kakushintō	36,839	0.38	2	–1
Other parties	1,445	0.01	0	–
Independents	347,668	3.56	12	+7
Total	9,764,632	100.00	466	0
Valid votes	9,764,632	99.50		
Invalid/blank votes	49,036	0.50		
Total votes	9,813,668	100.00		
Registered voters/turnout	13,103,679	74.89		
Source: Voice Japan

=== By prefecture ===
Prefecture	Total seats	Seats won					
Prefecture	Total seats	Rikken Seiyūkai	Rikken Minseitō	SDP	Rōnō Taishūtō	Kakushintō	Ind.
Aichi	17	11	5				1
Akita	7	4	3				
Aomori	6	4	2				
Chiba	11	8	3				
Ehime	9	7	2				
Fukui	5	3	2				
Fukuoka	18	12	3	2			1
Fukushima	11	7	3				1
Gifu	9	6	3				
Gunma	9	6	3				
Hiroshima	13	7	6				
Hokkaido	20	13	6				1
Hyōgo	19	11	7			1	
Ibaraki	11	8	2				1
Ishikawa	6	4	2				
Iwate	7	6	1				
Kagawa	6	4	2				
Kagoshima	12	12					
Kanagawa	11	6	5				
Kōchi	6	4	1				1
Kumamoto	10	6	3				1
Kyoto	11	7	3				1
Mie	9	5	3				1
Miyagi	8	6	2				
Miyazaki	5	5					
Nagano	13	7	6				
Nagasaki	9	5	4				
Nara	5	2	2				1
Niigata	15	10	4			1	
Ōita	7	5	2				
Okayama	10	9	1				
Okinawa	5	4	1				
Osaka	21	10	10		1		
Saga	6	4	2				
Saitama	11	8	3				
Shiga	5	3	2				
Shimane	6	2	4				
Shizuoka	13	8	5				
Tochigi	9	6	3				
Tokushima	6	4	2				
Tokyo	31	15	13	1	1		1
Tottori	4	2	1				1
Toyama	6	4	2				
Wakayama	6	5	1				
Yamagata	8	5	3				
Yamaguchi	9	7	2				
Yamanashi	5	4	1				
Total	466	301	146	3	2	2	12
