= Seiyūhontō =

Seiyūhontō 政友本党
- Leader: Tokonami Takejirō
- Founded: 29 January 1924
- Dissolved: June 1927
- Succeeded by: Rikken Seiyūkai (Hatoyama faction, via Dōkōkai); Rikken Minseitō (Mainstream faction, de jure); Rikken Seiyūkai (Mainstream faction, via Shintō Club, de facto)
- Ideology: Conservatism; Class collaboration

The Seiyūhontō (Japanese: 政友本党, lit. 'Orthodox Constitutional Friends Party') was a political party in Japan active from 1924 to 1927.

== History ==
The party was established on 29 January 1924 following a split in the Rikken Seiyūkai over Prime Minister Kiyoura Keigo forming a government largely made up of members of the House of Peers. Of the 278 Diet members of Rikken Seiyūkai, 129 remained in the party, which opposed Kiyoura and 149 left to form the Seiyūhontō, which were happy to share power. Opposition to his government led Kiyoura to call elections in May 1924, in which the Rikken Seiyūkai was reduced to 103 seats. Although the Seiyūhontō won 111, the Kenseikai emerged as the largest party, winning 151 seats; a coalition government was subsequently formed by the Kenseikai's Katō Takaaki together with Rikken Seiyūkai and the Kakushin Club.

After the Katō government fell in August 1925 following Rikken Seiyūkai pulling out of the coalition, Katō formed a new government with the Seiyūhontō. This led to a breakaway from the party by members opposed to its cooperation, who formed the Dōkōkai, reducing Seiyūhontō to 87 seats. The party joined the government of Wakatsuki Reijirō when he succeeded Katō as prime minister in 1926, but the coalition collapsed due to a dispute over positions in the cabinet.

In June 1927 the party merged with Kenseikei to form Rikken Minseitō. However, most of its former members, including Tokonami, quickly defected and returned to Rikken Seiyūkai.

== Election results ==
| Election | Leader | Votes | % | Seats | Position | Status |
|---|---|---|---|---|---|---|
| 1924 | Tokonami Takejirō | 730,077 | 24.8 | 111 / 464 | 2nd | Opposition (1924–1925) |
| 1924 | Tokonami Takejirō | 730,077 | 24.8 | 111 / 464 | 2nd | Government (1925–1927) |
