= Jotaro Saito =

Japanese fashion designer

- Known for: Fashion design
- Website: https://www.jotaro.net/

Jotaro Saito is a Japanese kimono and yukata (summer kimono) designer based in Japan.

== Career ==
Saito started in fashion at age 27. He uses the traditional method of hand-drawn yūzen dyeing for his kimono. He has participated in Tokyo Fashion Week (Mercedes-Benz Fashion Week) since 2006.

Saito also works as an artist and interior designer, having previously creating an immense brocade piece for display in the Kanda Myojin Edo Cultural Complex. He is a member of the Council for Fashion Designers, Tokyo. On October 20, 2020, Saito displayed his fashion at an event at the Victoria and Albert Museum titled The Unbounded Potential of Kimono, Kyoto to Catwalk with the Embassy of Japan in the United Kingdom.

== Personal life and family ==
His late grandfather, Saizaburo Saito, and his father, Sansai Saito, were and are both kimono designers.
