= Tatsunosuke Takasaki =

Japanese politician

- 高碕 達之助
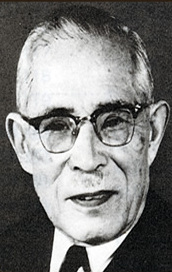
- Takasaki in 1959

Minister of International Trade and Industry
- In office 12 June 1958 – 18 June 1959
- Prime Minister: Nobusuke Kishi
- Preceded by: Shigesaburo Maeo
- Succeeded by: Hayato Ikeda

Director-General of the Science and Technology Agency
- In office 12 January 1959 – 18 June 1959; Acting: 31 December 1958 – 12 January 1959
- Prime Minister: Nobusuke Kishi
- Preceded by: Takeo Miki
- Succeeded by: Yasuhiro Nakasone

Director-General of the Economic Planning Agency
- In office 20 July 1955 – 23 December 1956
- Prime Minister: Ichiro Hatoyama
- Preceded by: Himself (as Director-General of the Economic Deliberation Agency)
- Succeeded by: Kōichi Uda

Director-General of the Economic Deliberation Agency
- In office 10 December 1954 – 20 July 1955
- Prime Minister: Ichiro Hatoyama
- Preceded by: Kiichi Aichi
- Succeeded by: Himself (as Director-General of the Economic Planning Agency)

Member of the House of Representatives
- In office 28 February 1955 – 24 February 1964
- Preceded by: Ken Harada
- Succeeded by: Mikio Ōmi
- Constituency: Osaka 3rd

Personal details
- Born: 7 February 1885 Takatsuki, Osaka, Japan
- Died: 24 February 1964 (aged 79) Tokyo, Japan
- Party: Liberal Democratic
- Education: Tokyo University of Marine Science and Technology

Tatsunosuke Takasaki (高碕達之助, Takasaki Tatsunosuke; 7 February 1885 – 24 February 1964) was a Japanese businessman-politician.

== Early life ==
Takasaki was born in Takatsuki, Japan, on 7 February 1885. After finishing school in Japan, Takasaki spent his younger days in Manchuria, and was the chairman of Manchurian Industrial Development Company.

== Business career ==
After studying canning techniques abroad, Takasaki founded Toyo Seikan Kaisha in 1917, which has since become the largest container company in Japan and dominates the ASEAN market.

Takasaki became the first chairman of Electric Power Development Company in 1953.

== Wartime experience ==
Takasaki was in Manchuria at the end of WW2, and helped negotiate the repatriation of Japanese civilians as the head of the All Manchurian Japanese Association (Japanese: 全満日本人会) located in Xinjing, while waiting for the repatriation from Huludao.

== Political career ==
Takasaki was an elected member of the House of Representatives of Japan, the head of the Japanese delegation to Asian–African Conference, the first head of the Economic Planning Agency, the initiator of the Sino-Japanese LT Trade Agreement, etc.

He served in various Cabinet positions in the 1950s, including a period as Minister of International Trade and Industry from 1958 to 1959.

From 1960 to 1962, Takasaki and China's Liao Chengzhi led the effort to expand trade relations between Japan and communist China, culminating in the signing of the Memorandum on Sino-Japanese Long-Term Comprehensive Trade (also known as the Liao-Takasaki Trade Agreement or simply the LT Trade Agreement).

This agreement opened the way for the resumption of a small amount of "friendship" trade between the two nations, an important step on the path to the normalization of relations between Japan and China.

== Death ==
Takasaki died in Tokyo on 24 February 1964.

== See also ==
- People's Republic of China – Japan relations
- Politics of Manchukuo

Political offices
Preceded by Shigesaburo Maeo	Minister of International Trade and Industry; 1958–1959	Succeeded by Hayato Ikeda
