= Yamamoto Jōtarō =

Japanese bureaucrat, politician, and entrepreneur

- 山本 条太郎
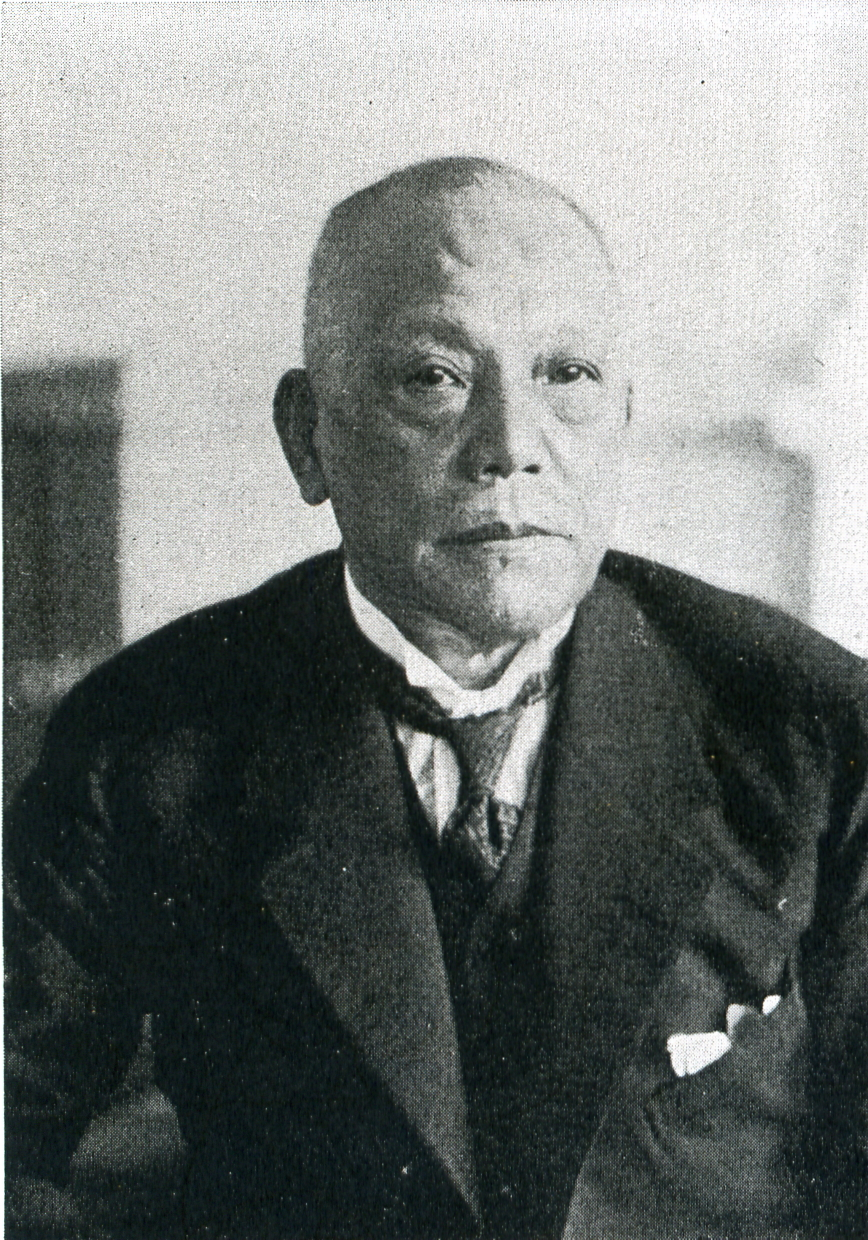
- Yamamoto in 1932

Member of the House of Peers
- In office 3 December 1935 – 25 March 1936 Nominated by the Emperor

Member of the House of Representatives
- In office 10 May 1920 – 3 December 1935
- Preceded by: Constituency established
- Succeeded by: Tagayasu Fukuda
- Constituency: Fukui 1st (1920–1928); Fukui Prefecture (1928–1935)

Personal details
- Born: 11 October 1867 Fukui, Echizen, Japan
- Died: 25 March 1936 (aged 68) Tokyo, Japan
- Resting place: Tama Cemetery
- Party: Rikken Seiyūkai
- Known for: Development of the South Manchurian Railway

Yamamoto Jōtarō (山本条太郎; October 11, 1867 – March 25, 1936) was a politician and businessman in late Meiji and early Taishō period Empire of Japan. He is noted for his involvement in the Siemens scandal of 1914 and in the development of the South Manchurian Railway.

== Early life and career ==
Yamamoto Jōtarō was born on October 11, 1867, in Echizen Province (part of present-day Echizen, Fukui Prefecture) as the eldest son of Yamamoto Jōetsu, a samurai of the Fukui Domain. Yamamoto attended and dropped out from the Kaisei Academy.

After joining Mitsui Bussan, he worked at the Yokohama branch, Shanghai branch, Shanghai Boseki Company, and Osaka branch, rising rapidly through the corporate ranks, becoming Executive Director of Mitsui by 1909. He was forced to resign from Mitsui in 1914, after being implicated in the Siemens Bribery Scandal, a spectacular political scandal involving collusion between several high-ranking members of the Imperial Japanese Navy, Mitsui, and the German industrial conglomerate Siemens AG. After Yamamoto resigned, he became an entrepreneur, and started several companies.

== Political career ==
In 1920, Yamamoto turned his attention to politics and ran for the House of Representatives for the Rikken Seiyūkai political party. He was reelected five consecutive times.

From 1927 to 1929, under the sponsorship of Prime Minister Tanaka Giichi, Yamamoto was made Chairman of the semi-governmental South Manchurian Railway Company, presiding over a period of successful expansion for the company. One of his first tasks was to negotiate leases to permit the building of two additional spur lines directly with Fengtian clique warlord Zhang Zuolin, circumventing the Japanese Ministry of Foreign Affairs. This act of independent diplomacy was authorized by Tanaka, who also held the portfolio of Foreign Minister as well as Prime Minister.

Yamamoto also worked closely with the Japanese Consul-General in Mukden, Shigeru Yoshida, in influencing the foreign policy of the Tanaka administration into a stronger stance to promote Japanese economic interests in northern China. However, the Huanggutun Incident, the assassination of Zhang Zuolin by agents of the Kwantung Army also occurred during his tenure, and he was forced into retirement.

== Personal life ==
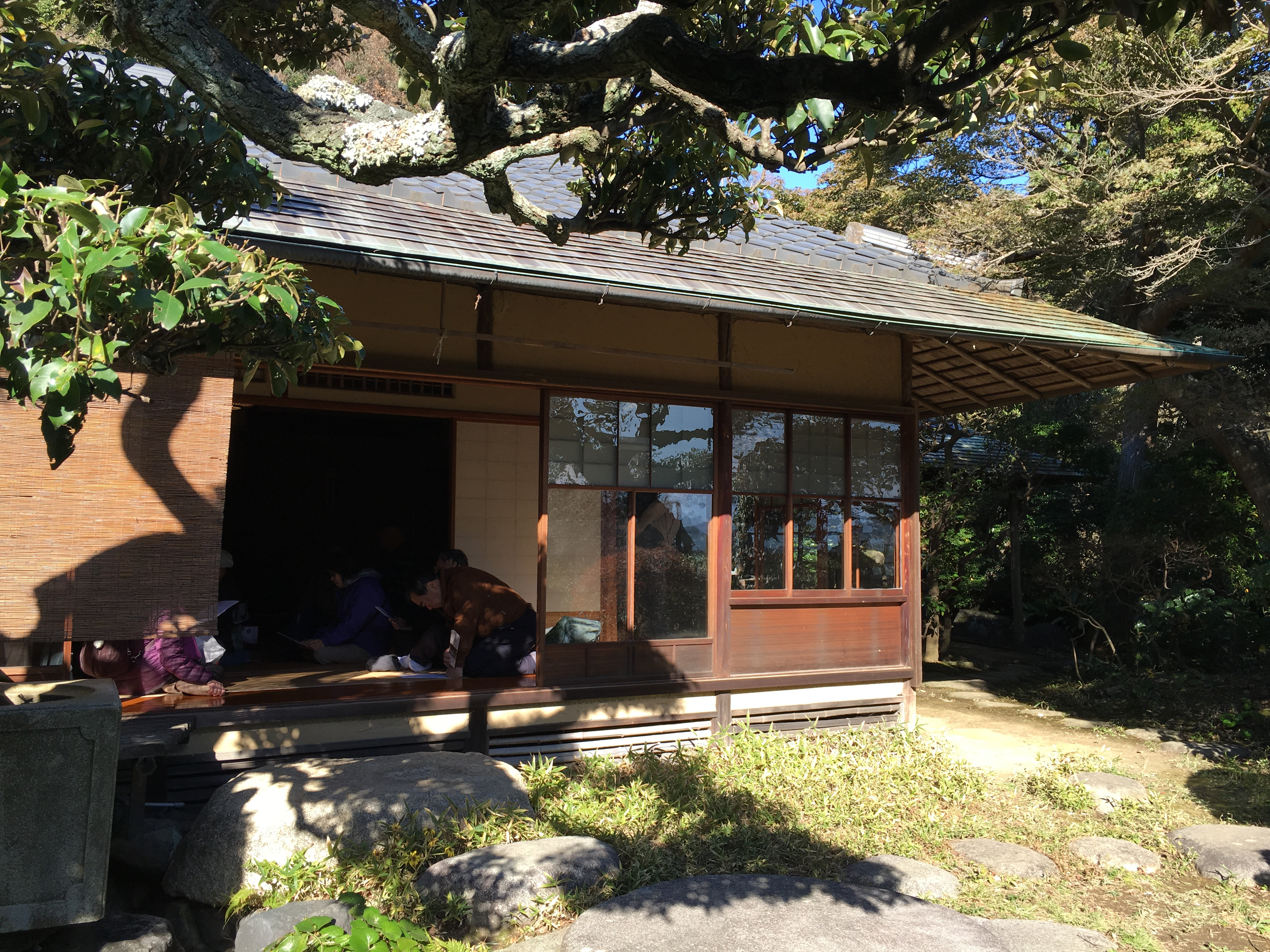
The summer villa of Yamamoto Jōtarō in Kamakura

Yamamoto had a summer villa located in Kamakura and is designated a Registered tangible cultural property (building).

He was also known as a master of the Japanese tea ceremony, a pursuit to which he devoted his retirement years. His grave is at the Tama Cemetery in Fuchū, Tokyo.
