= 1924 Japanese general election =

- 10 May 1924

All 464 seats in the House of Representatives 233 seats needed for a majority
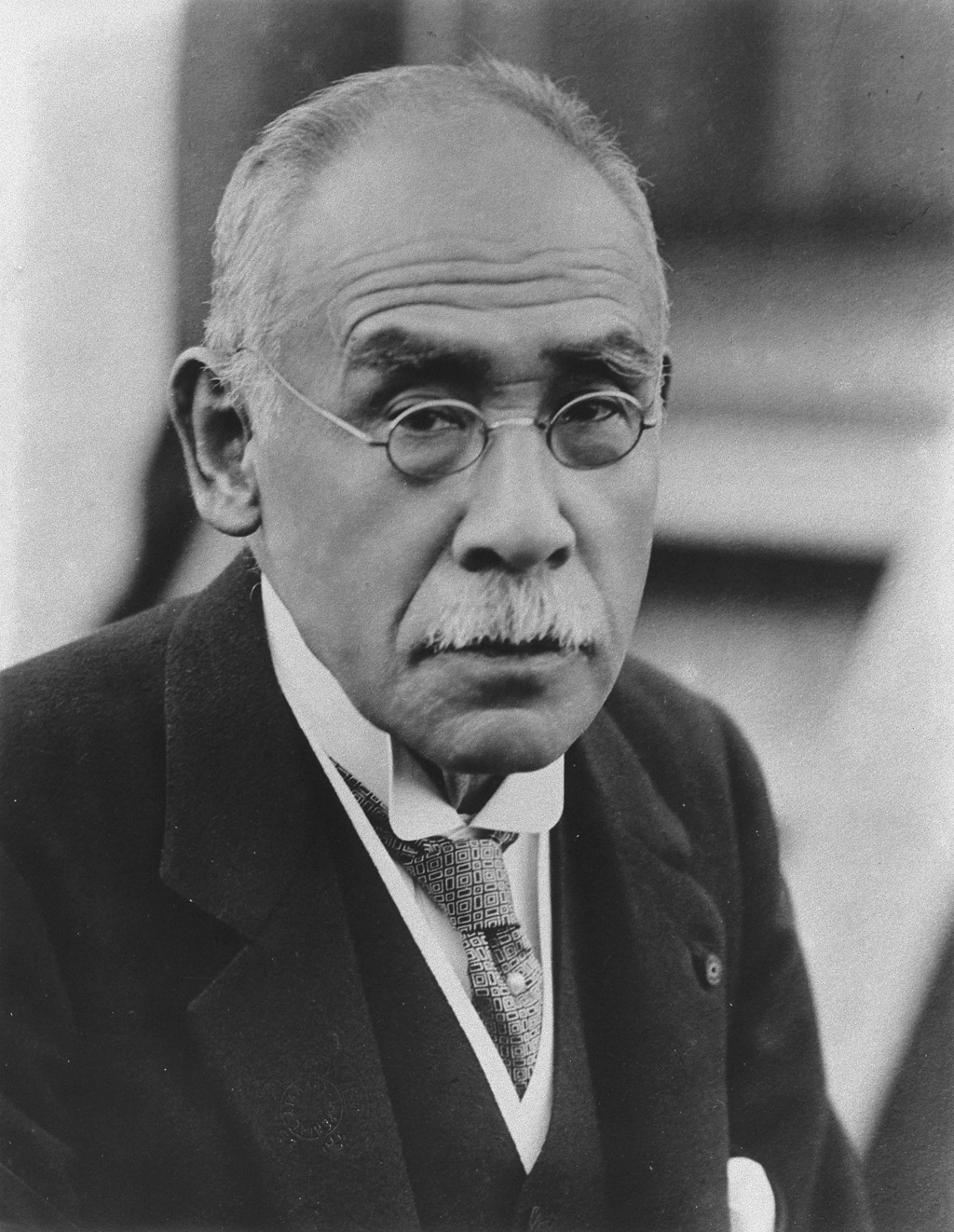

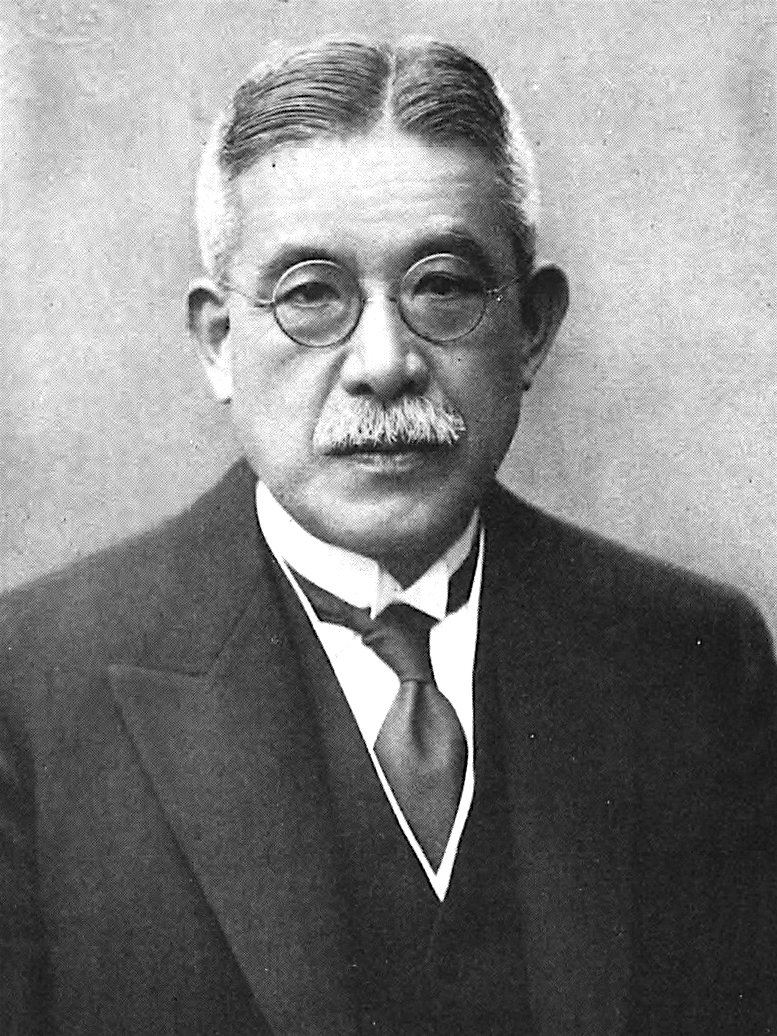

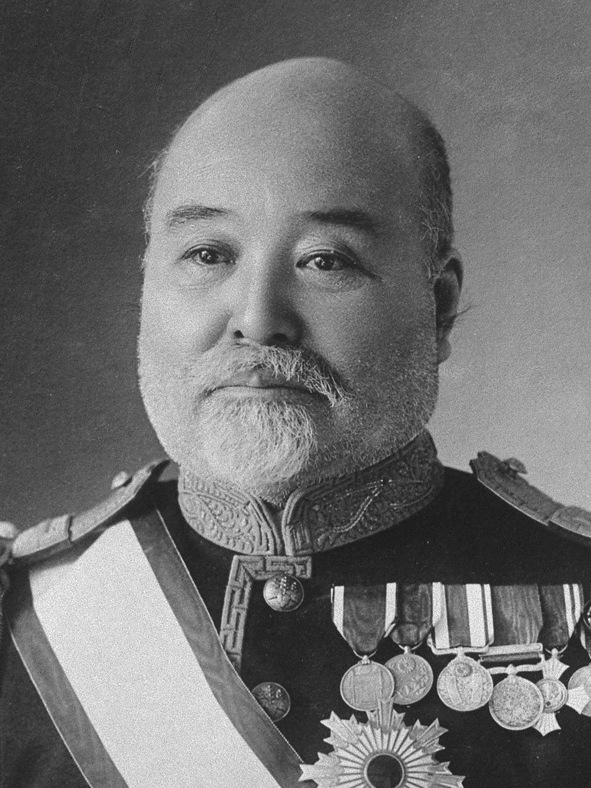

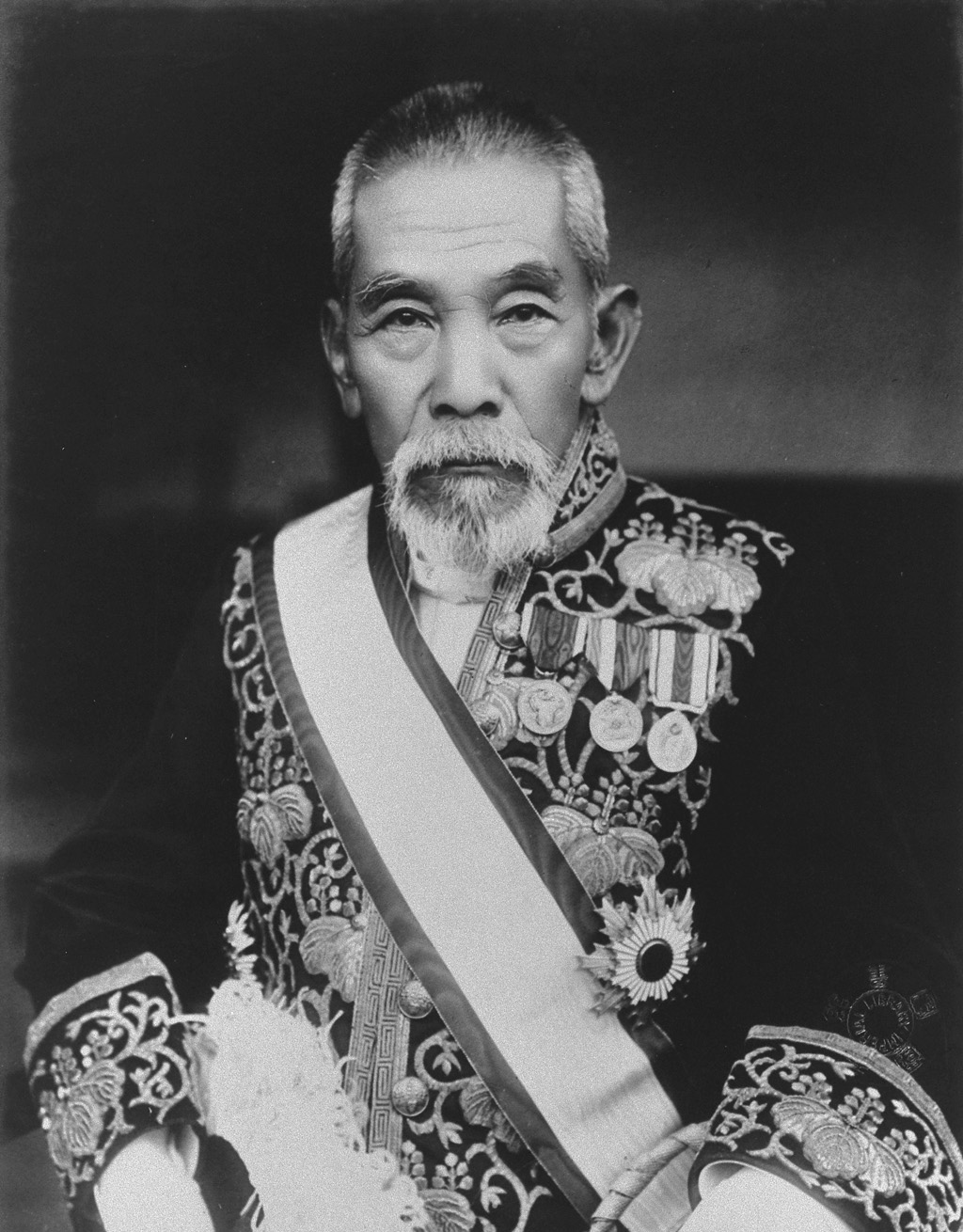
	First party	Second party
Leader	Kato Takaaki	Tokonami Takejirō
Party	Kenseikai	Seiyūhontō
Last election	27.11%, 110 seats	Did not exist
Seats won	151	111
Seat change	▲41	New
Popular vote	872,533	730,077
Percentage	29.35%	24.56%
Swing	▲2.24pp	New
	Third party	Fourth party
Leader	Takahashi Korekiyo	Inukai Tsuyoshi
Party	Rikken Seiyūkai	Kakushin Club
Last election	55.77%, 278 seats	Did not exist
Seats won	103	30
Seat change	▼175	New
Popular vote	666,317	182,720
Percentage	22.41%	6.15%
Swing	▼33.36pp	New
Prime Minister before election
Kiyoura Keigo
Independent
Elected Prime Minister
Kato Takaaki
Kenseikai

General elections were held in Japan on 10 May 1924. No party won a majority of seats, resulting in Kenseikai, Rikken Seiyūkai and the Kakushin Club forming the country's first coalition government led by Katō Takaaki.

== Electoral system ==
The 464 members of the House of Representatives were elected in 295 single-member constituencies, 68 two-member constituencies and 11 three-member constituencies. Voting was restricted to men aged over 25 who paid at least 3 yen a year in direct taxation.

== Campaign ==
A total of 972 candidates contested the elections, of which 265 were from Kenseikai, 242 from Seiyūhontō, 218 from Rikken Seiyūkai, 53 from the Kakushin Club and 194 from minor parties or running as independents.

== Results ==
Party	Votes	%	Seats	+/–
Kenseikai	872,533	29.35	151	+41
Seiyūhontō	730,077	24.56	111	New
Rikken Seiyūkai	666,317	22.41	103	–175
Kakushin Club	182,720	6.15	30	New
Others	521,311	17.54	69	+22
Total	2,972,958	100.00	464	0
Valid votes	2,972,958	99.16		
Invalid/blank votes	25,310	0.84		
Total votes	2,998,268	100.00		
Registered voters/turnout	3,288,405	91.18		
Source: Mackie & Rose, Voice Japan
