= Hisato Ichimada =

18th Governor of the Bank of Japan

- 一萬田 尚登
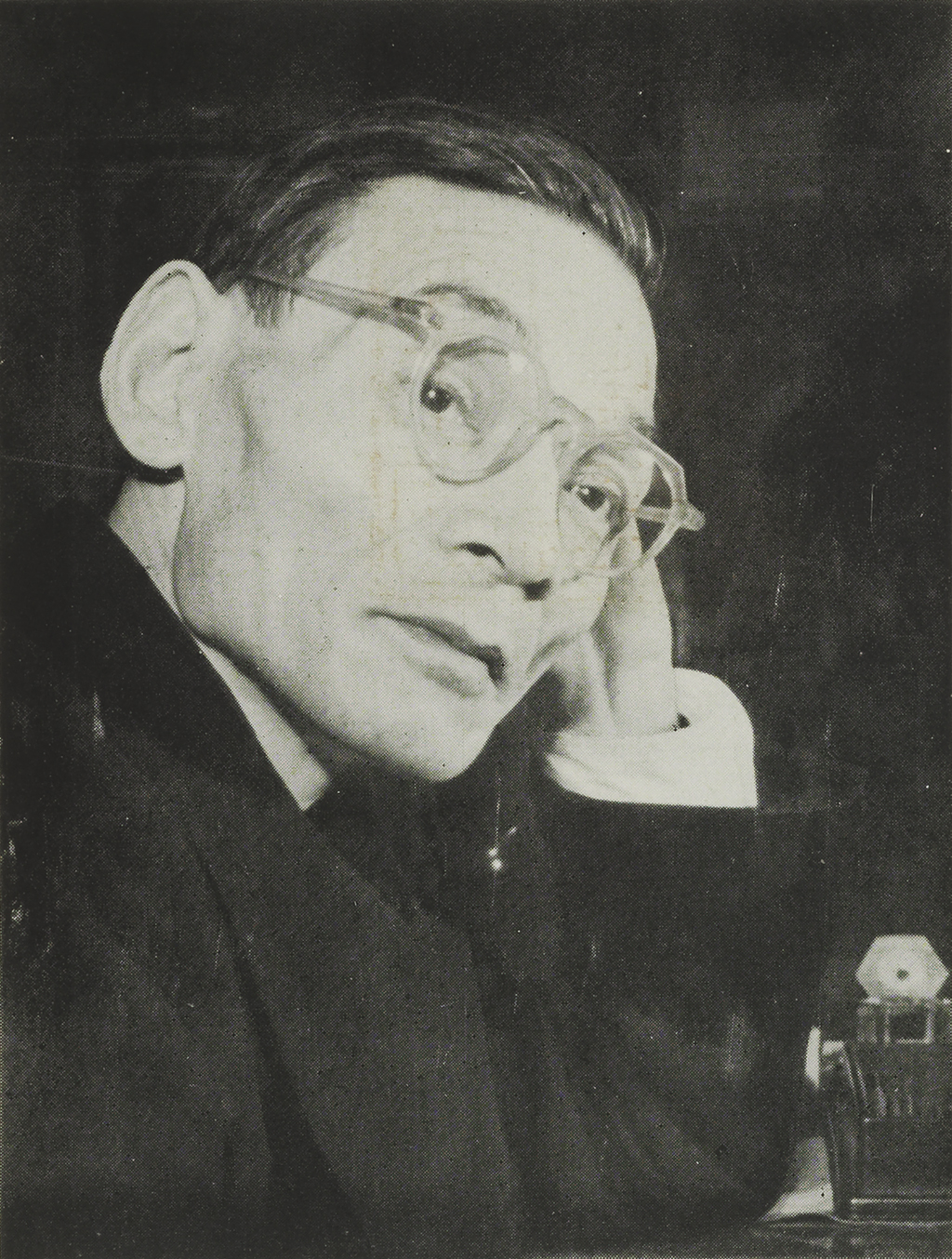
- Ichimada in 1955

Minister of Finance
- In office 10 July 1957 – 12 June 1958
- Prime Minister: Nobusuke Kishi
- Preceded by: Hayato Ikeda
- Succeeded by: Eisaku Satō
- In office 10 December 1954 – 23 December 1956
- Prime Minister: Ichirō Hatoyama
- Preceded by: Sankurō Ogasawara
- Succeeded by: Hayato Ikeda

18th Governor of the Bank of Japan
- In office 1 June 1946 – 10 December 1954
- Preceded by: Eikichi Araki
- Succeeded by: Eikichi Araki

Member of the House of Representatives
- In office 28 February 1955 – 2 December 1969
- Preceded by: Tsuneo Kanemitsu
- Succeeded by: Tadafumi Hatano
- Constituency: Ōita 1st

Personal details
- Born: 12 August 1893 Notsuharu, Ōita, Japan
- Died: 22 January 1984 (aged 90)
- Party: Liberal Democratic
- Other political affiliations: Democratic (1954–1955)
- Education: Tokyo Imperial University

Hisato Ichimada (一萬田 尚登, Ichimada Hisato; 12 August 1893 – 22 January 1984) was a Japanese banker and politician who served as Minister of Finance from 1954 to 1956 and 1957 to 1958, and as Governor of the Bank of Japan from 1946 to 1954.

Ichimada was an important figure in the post-war revival of the Japanese economy.

== Biography ==
Ichimada was born in Notsuharu, Ōita on 12 August 1893. He attended Tokyo Imperial University, and joined the Bank of Japan after graduating in 1918. From 1923 to 1926 Ichimada was posted in Germany to study the monetary policy of the Reichsbank. He came to greatly admire Reichsbank president Hjalmar Schacht.

Rising within the Bank of Japan, Ichimada became director general of the Bank Examination Department in 1942 and a board member in 1944. Following the Japanese surrender, the Bank of Japan Governor Eikichi Araki was purged by the occupation in 1946. Ichimada was appointed as his successor.

As Governor, Ichimada used the lessons from his time in Weimar Germany to curb inflation and stabilise the Yen. He is also believed to have initiated the use of "window guidance" to allocate credit. His authority led to him being nicknamed "the Pope." Prime Minister Shigeru Yoshida chose him as one of the Japanese plenipotentiaries to sign the Treaty of San Francisco.

Ichimada also headed the Japanese part of the fundraising operation to found the International Christian University, although he himself was Buddhist. He was chairman of the Japan-India Association from 1952 to 1955.

When Ichiro Hatoyama became prime minister in 1954, Ichimada became Minister of Finance as a non-parliamentary minister. While in this position he was elected to the 1955 House of Representatives election for Japan Democratic Party led by Hatoyama. He participated in the formation of the Liberal Democratic Party the same year. Ichimada left a Minister of Finance with the end of the Hatoyama cabinet in 1956, but was reappointed under Prime Minister Nobusuke Kishi in 1957. He left due to the reshuffle in 1958.

Ichimada continued to serve as a Diet member until retiring in 1969. He died of heart failure on January 22, 1984, at the age of 90.

He was one of the signatories of the agreement to convene a convention for drafting a world constitution. As a result, for the first time in human history, a World Constituent Assembly convened to draft and adopt the Constitution for the Federation of Earth.

Political offices
Preceded by Sankurō Ogasawara	Minister of Finance; 1954–1956	Succeeded by Hayato Ikeda
Preceded by Hayato Ikeda	Minister of Finance; 1957–1958	Succeeded by Eisaku Satō
Government offices
Preceded by Eikichi Araki (1st term)	Governor of the Bank of Japan; 1946–1954	Succeeded by Eikichi Araki (2nd term)
Non-profit organization positions
Preceded by Nobutsune Ōkuma	Chair, Japan-India Association; 1952–1955	Succeeded by Yoshio Sakurauchi
