= Kakushin Club =

Former Japanese political party

Kakushin Club 革新倶楽部
- Leader: Inukai Tsuyoshi
- Founded: 8 November 1922
- Dissolved: May 1925
- Preceded by: Rikken Kokumintō
- Merged into: Kakushintō (factions); Rikken Seiyūkai (factions)

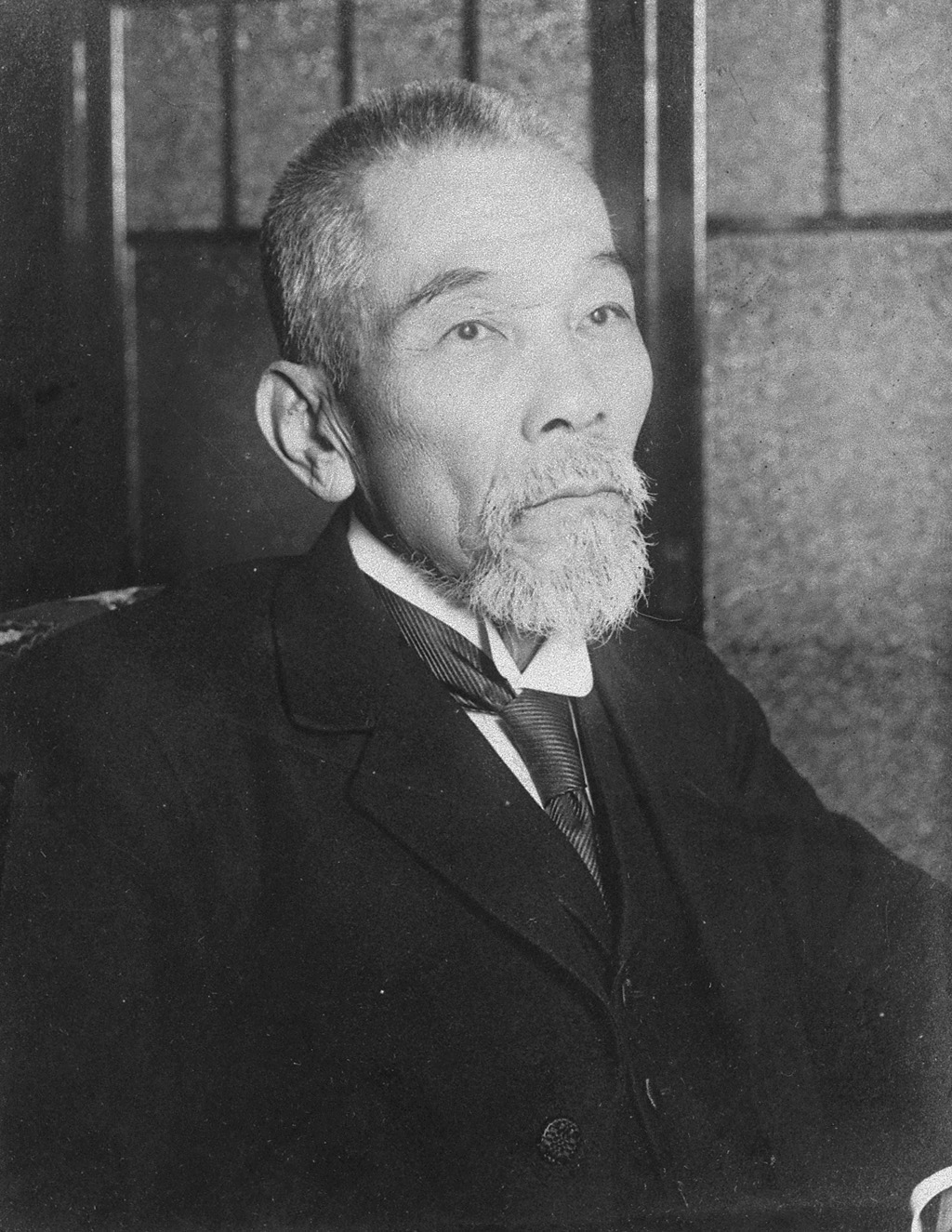
Inukai Tsuyoshi, the most influential member of the Kakushin Club

The Kakushin Club (Japanese: 革新倶楽部, lit. 'Reformist Club') was a political party in Japan.

== History ==
The party was established on 8 November 1922 as a merger of the Rikken Kokumintō (29 National Diet members), the Mushozoku Club (14 Diet members) and three independents. Dominated by the influence of Inukai Tsuyoshi, the Kakushin Club was the most democratic party of its age in Japan; it supported democratising politics by the immediate introduction of universal male suffrage and the election of prefectural governors. It also supported reforms to the economy and education, and an internationalist foreign policy, and attracted attention due to the relatively high number of female members.

In 1923 the party held talks with the Kenseikai about a merger, but the two parties were unable to reach agreement over who would lead the new party. However, following the 1924 elections in which the Kakushin Club won 30 seats, it joined the coalition government led by the Kenseikai's Katō Takaaki, together with Rikken Seiyūkai.

In May 1925 the party split, with 18 Diet members joining Rikken Seiyūkai, eight merging with the Chūsei Club to form the Shinsei Club and the other two sitting as independents.

== Election results ==
Election	Votes	%	Seats
1924	182,720	6.15	30 / 464
