= Ichirō Hatoyama =

Prime Minister of Japan from 1954 to 1956

- 鳩山 一郎
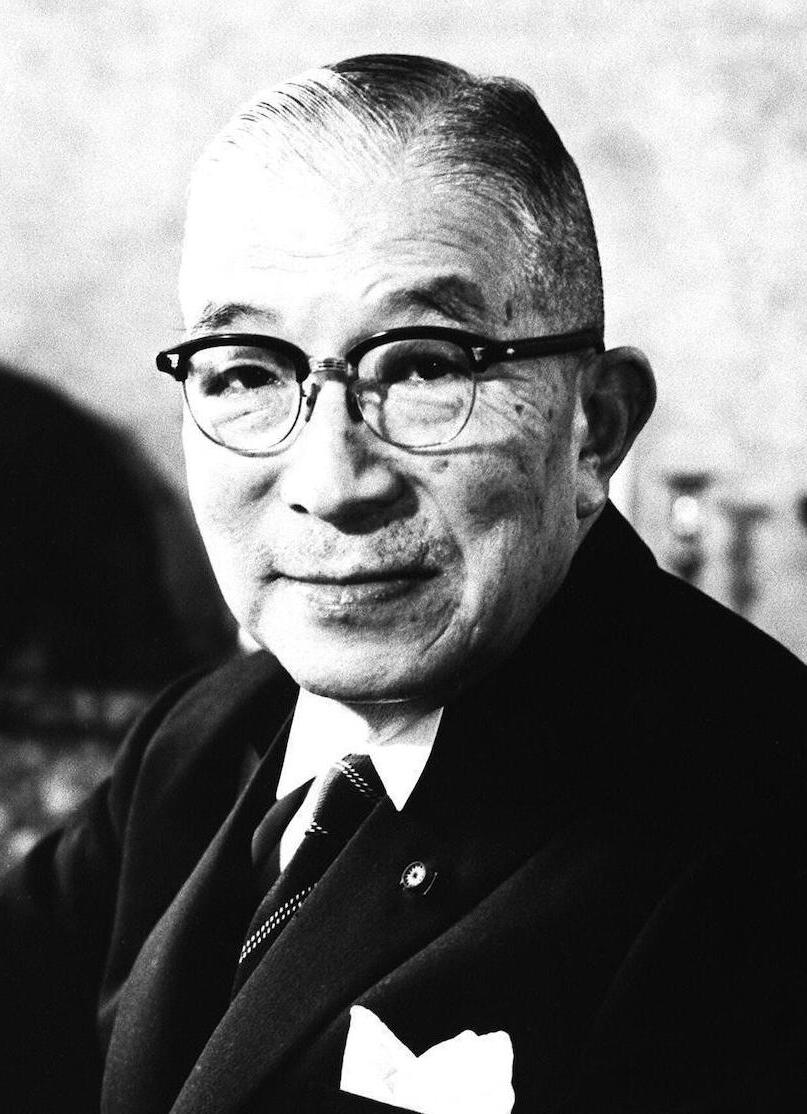
- Official portrait, 1954

Prime Minister of Japan
- In office 10 December 1954 – 23 December 1956
- Monarch: Hirohito
- Deputy: Mamoru Shigemitsu
- Preceded by: Shigeru Yoshida
- Succeeded by: Tanzan Ishibashi

President of the Liberal Democratic Party
- In office 5 April 1956 – 14 December 1956
- Secretary-General: Nobusuke Kishi
- Preceded by: Position established
- Succeeded by: Tanzan Ishibashi
Ministerial offices
Minister of Education
In office 13 December 1931 – 3 March 1934
Prime Minister	Tsuyoshi Inukai; Saitō Makoto
Preceded by	Ryūzō Tanaka
Succeeded by	Saitō Makoto (acting); Genji Matsuda
Chief Cabinet Secretary
In office 20 April 1927 – 2 July 1929
Prime Minister	Giichi Tanaka
Preceded by	Seiji Tsukamoto
Succeeded by	Fujiya Suzuki
Party political offices
President of the Japan Democratic Party
In office 24 November 1954 – 15 November 1955
Vice President	Mamoru Shigemitsu
Preceded by	Position established
Succeeded by	Position abolished
President of the Liberal Party–Hatoyama
In office 18 March 1953 – 10 December 1953
Preceded by	Position established
Succeeded by	Position abolished
President of the Liberal Party
In office 9 November 1945 – 18 August 1946
Preceded by	Position established
Succeeded by	Shigeru Yoshida
Secretary-General of the Rikken Seiyūkai
In office 27 March 1926 – 16 April 1927
President	Tanaka Giichi
Preceded by	Yonezō Maeda
Succeeded by	Yamamoto Jōtarō

Member of the House of Representatives
- In office 2 October 1952 – 7 March 1959
- Preceded by: Mitsuji Ide
- Succeeded by: Seiichirō Yasui
- Constituency: Tokyo 1st
- In office 25 March 1915 – 7 May 1946
- Preceded by: Multi-member district
- Succeeded by: Constituency abolished
- Constituency: Tokyo City (1915–1920); Tokyo 10th (1920–1928); Tokyo 2nd (1928–1946)

Member of the Tokyo City Council
- In office 2 April 1912 – 26 March 1915

Personal details
- Born: 1 January 1883 Shinjuku, Tokyo, Japan
- Died: 7 March 1959 (aged 76) Bunkyō, Tokyo, Japan
- Party: Liberal Democratic (after 1955)
- Other political affiliations: Rikken Seiyūkai (1915–1924; 1927–1940); Seiyūhontō (1924–1927); IRAPA (1942–1943); JLP (1945–1948); DLP (1948–1950); LP (1950–1953; 1953–1954); LP–H (1953); JDP (1954–1955)
- Spouse: Kaoru Terada (m. 1908)
- Children: 6, including Iichirō
- Parent(s): Kazuo Hatoyama; Haruko Taga
- Relatives: Hatoyama family
- Education: Tokyo Imperial University
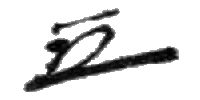
- Signature

Ichirō Hatoyama (鳩山 一郎, Hatoyama Ichirō; 1 January 1883 – 7 March 1959) was a Japanese politician who served as prime minister of Japan from 1954 to 1956. During his tenure he oversaw the formation of the Liberal Democratic Party (LDP) and restored official relations with the Soviet Union.

Hatoyama was born in Tokyo as the eldest son of politician Kazuo Hatoyama. After graduating from Tokyo Imperial University, he practiced law before entering political life, and was first elected to the Diet in 1915 as a member of the Rikken Seiyūkai. He served as chief cabinet secretary under Giichi Tanaka from 1927 to 1929, and minister of education under Tsuyoshi Inukai and Makoto Saitō from 1931 to 1934. He was one of the leading members of the Seiyukai prior to its dissolution in 1940, and during the Pacific War opposed the cabinet of Hideki Tōjō. In 1945, Hatoyama founded the Liberal Party, which became the largest party in the first post-war election, but he was purged by the American occupation authorities before taking office, and handed the post to Shigeru Yoshida. Hatoyama was de-purged in 1951, but his conflict with Yoshida over the leadership split the Liberal Party in two. Hatoyama then founded the Democratic Party in 1954.

In 1954, Hatoyama ousted Yoshida and finally succeeded him as prime minister. In 1955, his Democratic Party and the Liberal Party, formerly led by Yoshida, merged to form the Liberal Democratic Party, which has dominated Japanese politics ever since. During his tenure, Hatoyama attempted to push through an electoral reform to ensure a two-party system in order to revise the constitution's pacifist Article 9, but failed in both efforts. In 1956, he restored diplomatic relations with the Soviet Union, ending the formal state of war which had existed since 1945, and secured Japan's entry into the United Nations before he resigned.

Hatoyama is the grandfather of Yukio Hatoyama, who served as prime minister from 2009 to 2010.

== Early life ==
Ichirō Hatoyama was born in Tokyo, on New Year's Day of 1883, the eldest son of Kazuo Hatoyama and Haruko Hatoyama. His name indicated his status as the first born son in Japanese. Ichirō had an elder half-sister, Kazuko, and a younger brother Hideo, who became a noted jurist.

Their family had been samurai sworn to the Miura clan before the Meiji Restoration. Kazuo Hatoyama was among a group of students selected by the government to study in America in 1875. He graduated from Columbia University and Yale Law School. After returning to Japan, he became a lawyer, educator and politician. Haruko was an educator who helped found Kyoritsu Women's Vocational School in 1886.

Ichirō Hatoyama received much of his early education from his mother. From early on Hatoyama was encouraged to pursue a political career and he readily accepted this ambition. His father was elected to the House of Representatives in 1894 and was its Speaker from 1896 to 1897.

Hatoyama attended First Higher School and afterwards studied law at Tokyo Imperial University. After graduating in 1907 he began working in his father's law office. The following year he married Kaoru, the daughter of Sakae Terada, a judge and later member of the House of Peers. Her mother was a niece of Haruko Hatoyama.

== Pre-war political career ==
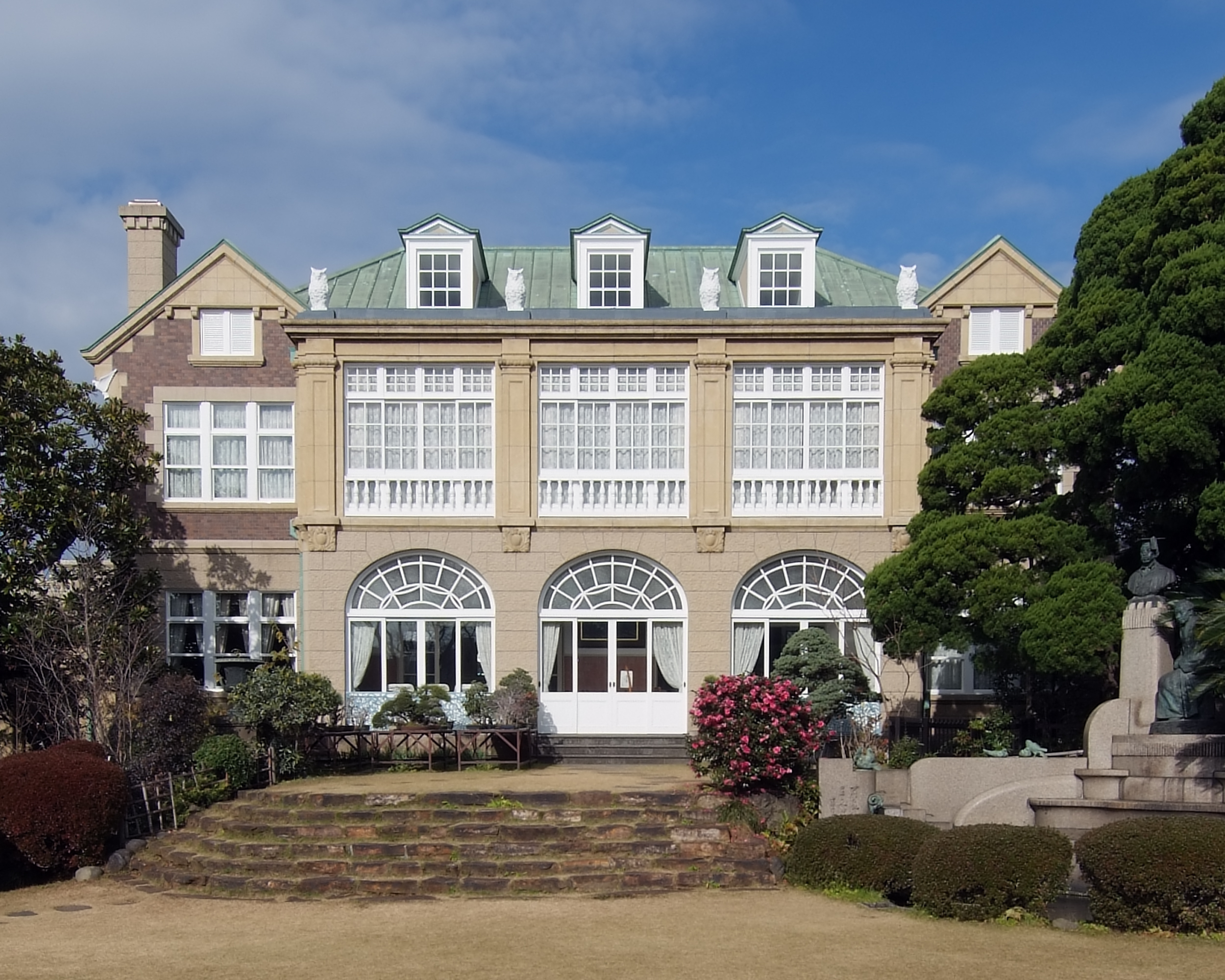
Hatoyama Hall, which Ichiro Hatoyama had built in 1924.

After his father died in 1911, Hatoyama was elected in the 1912 by-election for his father's seat in the Tokyo City Council. In the 1915 House of Representatives election, Hatoyama was elected from Tokyo district and belonged to the Rikken Seiyukai. A rival in the same constituency was Bukichi Miki, who later became a close friend and ally.

Property inherited from his father in Otowa, Bunkyō, Tokyo, was destroyed in the 1923 Great Kanto Earthquake. Hatoyama solicited his friend Shinichirō Okada to design a western-style residence in its stead. It was finished the following year and was called the Otowa Palace, and later Hatoyama Hall.

When Keigo Kiyoura became prime minister in January 1924 the Rikken Seiyukai split over whether or not to support him. Kisaburo Suzuki, the husband of Hatoyama's elder sister Kazuko, served as Minister of Justice in the new cabinet. Hatoyama participated in the Seiyūhontō organised by pro-Kiyoura forces led by Takejirō Tokonami. In June Kiyoura had to resign in favour of Takaaki Kato, who had formed a coalition of his own Kenseikai, the Seiyukai and the Kakushin Club. Seiyūhontō became the main opposition.

The Seiyukai withdrew from the coalition in July 1925. The Seiyūhontō moved towards coalition with the Kenseikai, but Hatoyama opposed this and left the party with about twenty Diet members in December. They returned to the Seiyukai in February the following year. Hatoyama was close to the new party president Giichi Tanaka who made him Secretary-General in March. Hatoyama's brother-in-law Kisaburo Suzuki joined the party around this time.

Tanaka was appointed prime minister in April 1927 and Hatoyama became his Chief Cabinet Secretary. Hatoyama befriended Shigeru Yoshida, who served as vice minister for foreign affairs at the same time. After the cabinet fell in July 1929 Minseito president Osachi Hamaguchi became prime minister and the Seiyukai fell to the opposition. Tanaka died in September. Kisaburo Suzuki, with the support of Hatoyama, had become the most influential factional leader in the party at this time, but Takejirō Tokonami had rejoined the party to contest the presidency. In order to prevent a split the respected elder Tsuyoshi Inukai was selected instead. During his time in the opposition Hatoyama criticised the London Naval Treaty.

=== Cabinet minister and party leader ===
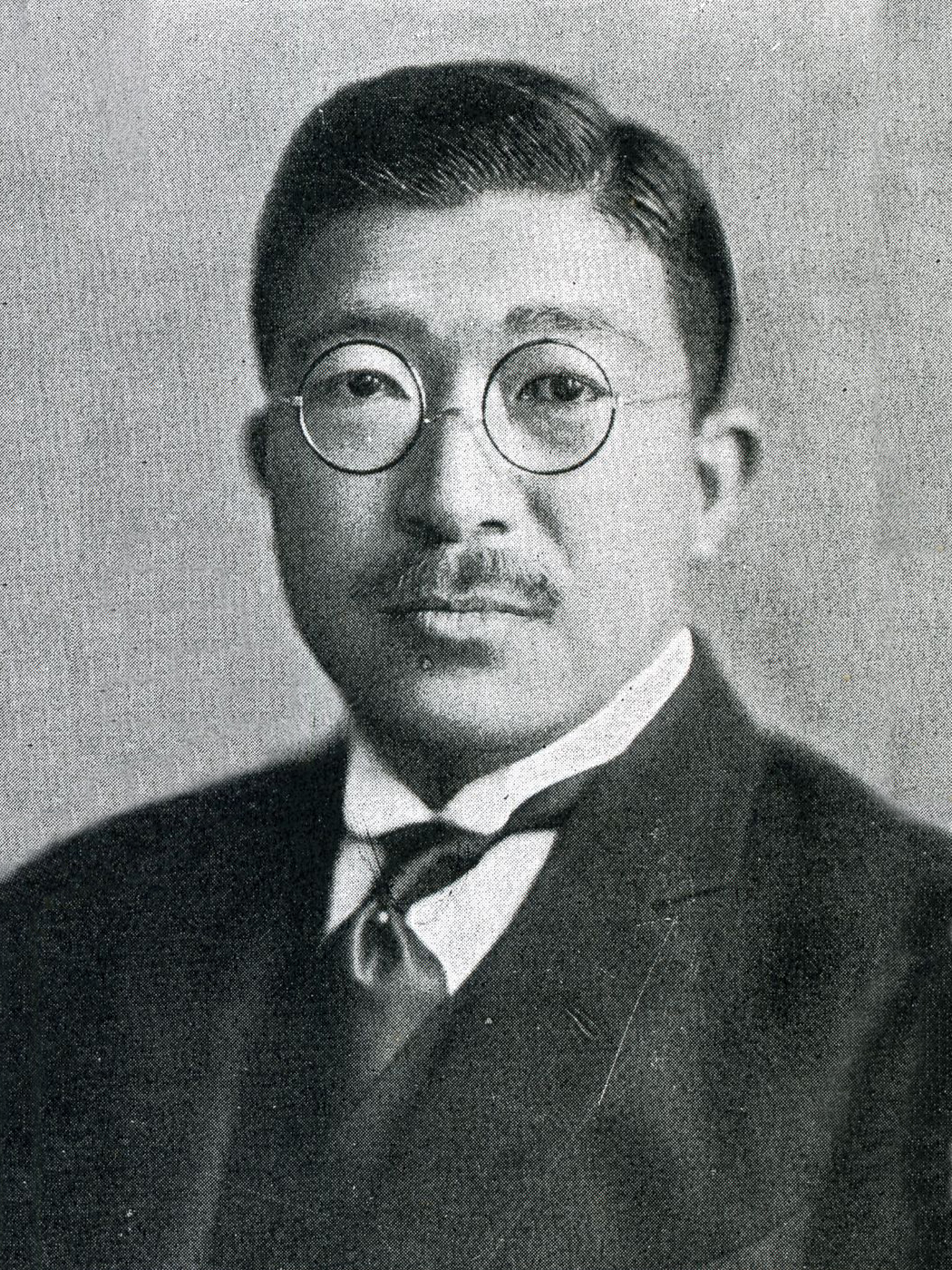
Hatoyama in 1932.

When Inukai was made prime minister in December 1931, Hatoyama became Minister of Education. Inukai was assassinated in the May 15 incident and Suzuki was elected to succeed him as Seiyukai president, but he didn't become prime minister, as the genrō Prince Saionji preferred to nominate Admiral Makoto Saito. Hatoyama continued in his post and became involved in a controversy in March 1933 when he had a professor at Kyoto Imperial University dismissed for leftist views. In March 1934 he was forced to resign due to alleged corruption in the Teijin Incident, which eventually led to the downfall of the Saito cabinet.

When Suzuki was once again passed over as prime minister, this time in favour of Admiral Keisuke Okada, the Seiyukai moved into the opposition, even expelling members who accepted positions in the new cabinet. By this time Hatoyama had become one of the most powerful men in the Seiyukai as the right-hand man of his brother-in-law.

The Seiyukai took major losses in the 1936 general election and this led Suzuki to resign the following year. Hatoyama and Chikuhei Nakajima were the leading candidates for the presidency, but to prevent schism a "Presidential Proxy Committee" was formed consisting of Hatoyama, Nakajima, Yonezō Maeda and Toshio Shimada. As there was too much antipathy against himself, Hatoyama decided to support Fusanosuke Kuhara as president. But in March 1939 the opponents of Kuhara and Hatoyama had Nakajima declared president in contravention to party rules. As a result, the party was split between a "reformist faction" led Nakajima and an "orthodox faction" led by Kuhara.

== Wartime period ==
Hatoyama opposed the trend towards military government. He led his faction to absent itself in protest against the expulsion of Takao Saitō for an anti-militarist speech. He resisted the dissolution of political parties and the formation of the Imperial Rule Assistance Association (IRAA) in 1940.

Hatoyama ran in the 1942 general election as a "non-endorsed" candidate, meaning he was not endorsed by the IRAA, but won his election anyway. Shared opposition to the Tojo cabinet brought him together with his old rival Bukichi Miki, who also ran and won as a non-endorsed candidate. Like most non-endorsed candidates elected, they were compelled to join the Imperial Rule Assistance Political Association when all other parliamentary caucuses were suppressed shortly after the election, but continued to resist from within. In November 1942, Hatoyama's son Iichirō married Yasuko Ishibashi, the daughter of Bridgestone founder Shojiro Ishibashi. Ishibashi became an important financial backer for Hatoyama.

As time went on, the prospects for resisting the cabinet seemed more and more futile. When fellow Diet member Bin Akao was expelled from the Imperial Rule Assistance Political Association for publicly rebuking Tojo in June 1943, Hatoyama and others decided to leave in solidarity. This practically made further political activities impossible, so Hatoyama decided to retire to his summer house in Karuizawa. Before leaving Tokyo he made a pledge with Miki that they would cooperate to rebuild Japan after the war. In Karuizawa he devoted himself to farming and study, but he also took part in plans surrounding Shigeru Yoshida and Fumimaro Konoe for an early peace with Britain and the United States.

== Post-war political career ==
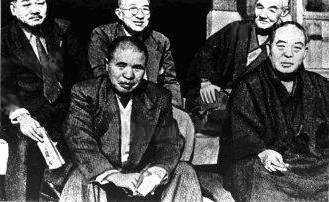
Ultranationalist fixer Yoshio Kodama in January 1953 during a visit by Ichirō Hatoyama and Bukichi Miki to his Tokyo estate.

Immediately after the Japanese surrender was announced on 15 August 1945 Hatoyama's old associates, in particular Hitoshi Ashida, began work for the creation a new political party for the post-war era. They convinced Hatoyama to return to Tokyo and become their leader. The Hatoyama Hall was damaged from air raids and Hatoyama lodged at Shojiro Ishibashi's Tokyo residence. Besides his old comrades from the Seiyukai he brought Bukichi Miki into the party. He also recruited liberal figures who had been aloof from party politics such as the journalist Tanzan Ishibashi.

Shojiro Ishibashi was a significant sponsor for the new party and his house would serve as a de facto office in the early days. Another substantial part of the funds came from Yoshio Kodama, who was then a cabinet advisor.

The Liberal Party was officially launched in November 1945 with Hatoyama as its president. Ashida was expected to become secretary-general, but he had been appointed health minister in the Shidehara cabinet formed the previous month. The post instead went to Ichirō Kōno. Miki became chairman of the General Council.

=== Purge from public office ===
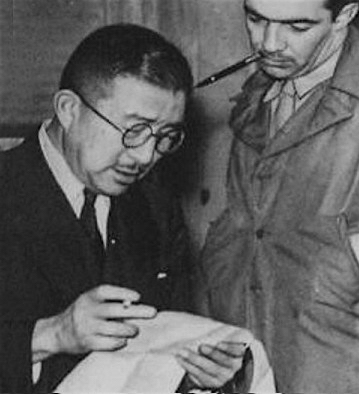
Hatoyama receives the purge order

In the first post-war election in April 1946, the Liberal Party became the largest party with 141 out of 468 seats. Hatoyama was expected to become prime minister, but while in the middle of putting together his cabinet, he was purged from public office by the occupation authority on 4 May. The purge order branded him a "ultranationalist and militarist" for his participation in pre-war cabinets.

Hatoyama was dumbfounded by the event, but he soon approached his old friend Shigeru Yoshida, who was foreign minister at the time, to take his place as prime minister and president of the Liberal Party. Yoshida initially demurred and Kazuo Kojima and Tsuneo Matsudaira were also considered as candidates, but Yoshida was ultimately persuaded to accept.

Yoshida was appointed prime minister on 22 May, and he would formally be elected party president at the convention in August. Hatoyama once again retired to Karuizawa. Another round of purges in June removed both Kōno and Miki from office.

As part of the so-called "Reverse Course," in American policy towards Japan, brought about by the increasing confrontation between the United States and the Communist bloc, many people were released from the purge, including Miki and Kono. Hatoyama himself was depurged in August 1951.

=== Conflict with Yoshida ===
At that time of Hatoyama's depurging his relationship with Yoshida had soured. Hatoyama believed Yoshida was involved in delaying his depurging. Furthermore, Yoshida had become a well established politician in his own right, and had no intention to step down in favour in Hatoyama as some people expected. In June, before his depurging, Hatoyama and Miki had considered creating a new party to challenge Yoshida, but the plan was scrapped after Hatoyama suffered a stroke. Hatoyama and his faction ultimately joined Yoshida's Liberal Party.

In November 1954, Hatoyama formed the Japan Democratic Party by merging the non-mainstream factions of the Liberal Party with the Kaishintō under Mamoru Shigemitsu, with Hatoyama as president, Shigemitsu as vice president, Nobusuke Kishi as secretary general and Miki as general council chairman. Hatoyama cooperated with the socialists to oust Yoshida the following month, and Hatoyama was nominated to succeed him.

== Premiership ==
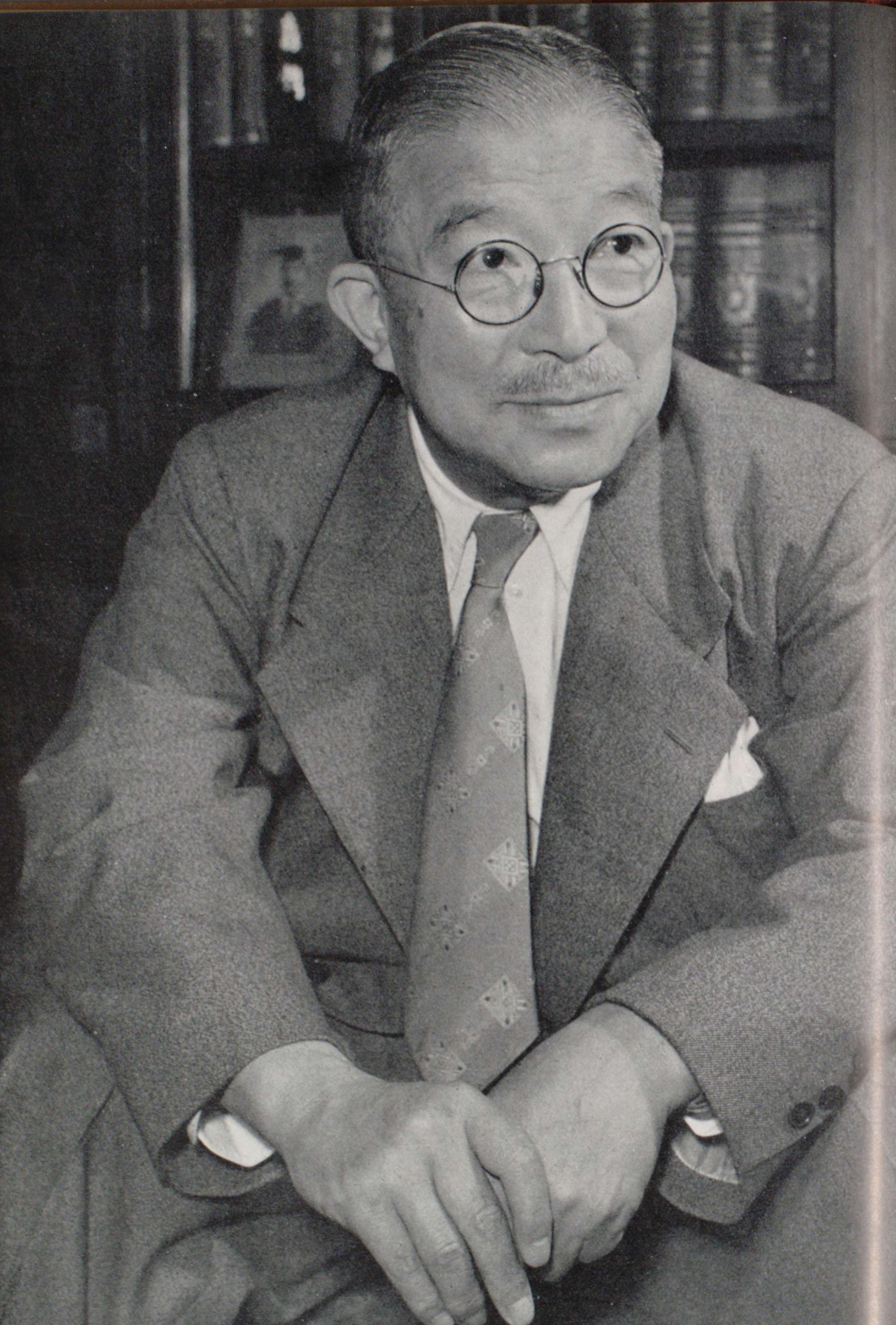
- Hatoyama in 1953
- Premiership of Ichirō Hatoyama; 10 December 1954 – 23 December 1956
- Monarch: Emperor Shōwa
- Cabinet: First Ichirō Hatoyama Cabinet; Second Ichirō Hatoyama Cabinet; Third Ichirō Hatoyama Cabinet
- Party: Japan Democratic; (1954–1955); Liberal Democratic; (1955–1956)
- Election: 1955
- Seat: Naikaku Sōri Daijin Kantei
- Constituency: Tokyo 1st
- Emblem of the Government of Japan

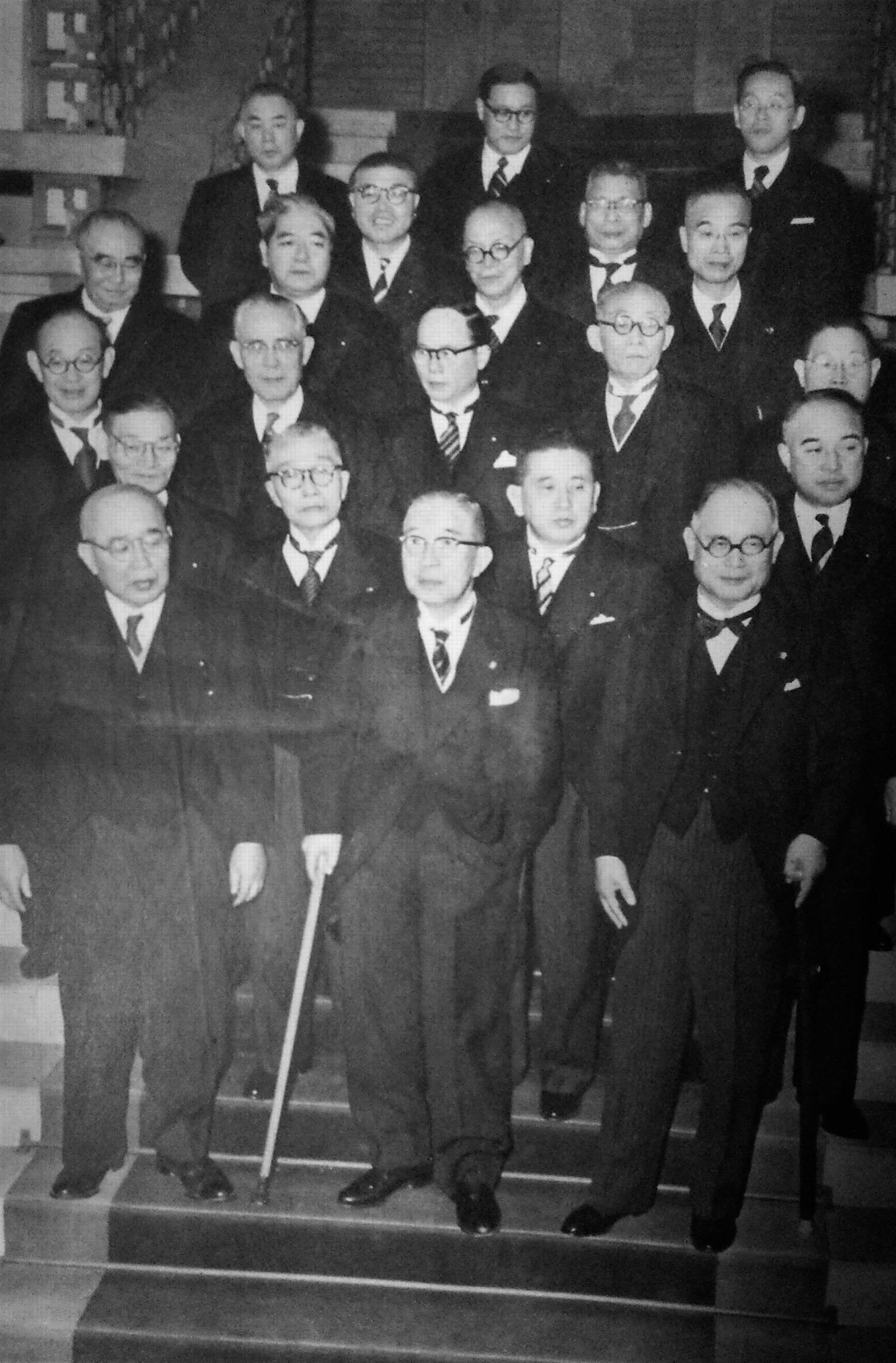
The Hatoyama Cabinet in 1955

Hatoyama was appointed prime minister in December 1954. His cabinet included Shigemitsu as deputy prime minister and foreign minister; Hisato Ichimada as finance minister; Tanzan Ishibashi as trade minister; and Ichiro Kono as agriculture minister.

Hatoyama favored pardons for some of the Class A war criminals who had been sentenced to life imprisonment by the Tokyo Trial. He hoped to revise the Constitution to remove Article 9 and eventually remilitarize Japan. To this end, in 1956 he established a "Constitutional Research Commission" to prepare for the process of constitutional revision.

That same year, Hatoyama attempted to implement his infamous "Hatomander" (ハトマンダー, hatomandā, a portmanteau of Hatoyama and Gerrymander), an attempt to replace Japan's SNTV multi-member constituencies with American-style first-past-the-post single-member districts, which would have made it easier for the LDP to secure the two-thirds of seats in the Lower House of the National Diet needed to revise the Constitution. The plan passed the Lower House of the Diet, but was shelved in the face of intense popular opposition before it could pass the Upper House.

In October 1956, he restored diplomatic ties with the Soviet Union, which had been severed since the Soviet declaration of war in 1945, through the Soviet–Japanese Joint Declaration of 1956. After that he announced his resignation as prime minister and stepped down in December 1956.

Ichirō Hatoyama died in his Hatoyama Hall house, in Tokyo's Bunkyō ward, on 7 March 1959. He was buried in the Yanaka Cemetery, in nearby Taitō ward.

== Family and beliefs ==
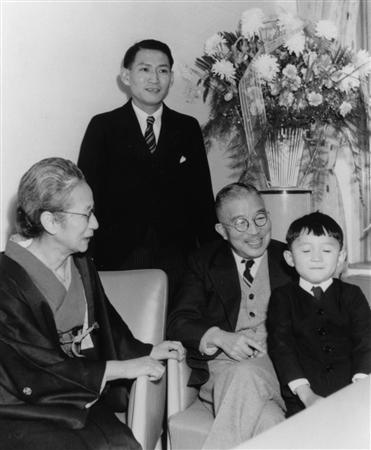
Kaoru, Iichirō, Ichirō, and Yukio.

Ichirō was a Protestant Christian. He was Japan's third postwar Christian Prime Minister.

Iichirō Hatoyama, Ichirō's only son, made a career for himself as a civil servant in the Budget Bureau of the Finance Ministry. Iichirō retired after having achieved the rank of administrative Vice Minister. In his second career in politics, he rose to become Foreign Minister of Japan in 1976–1977.

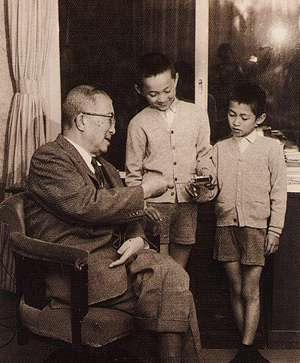
Ichirō Hatoyama, Yukio Hatoyama, and Kunio Hatoyama.

One of Ichirō's grandsons, Yukio Hatoyama, became prime minister in 2009 as a member of the Democratic Party of Japan. Another grandson Kunio Hatoyama was a prominent politician in the LDP.

During the purge against Ichirō (1946–1951), he received an English book The Totalitarian State against Man originally written in German by the half-Japanese Austrian Count Richard von Coudenhove-Kalergi from a professor of Waseda University Kesazō Ichimura (1898–1950) who wanted Ichirō to translate the English book into Japanese. The English book struck a sympathetic chord in Ichirō, and he began to advocate fraternity, also known as yūai (友愛) in Japanese.

Hatoyama founded the Yūai Kyōkai (or Yūai Association) in 1953 to promote his idea of fraternity. His widow and many of his descendants has served as officers in the association.

On 29 March 1951, he was initiated as a first degree Freemason, and on 26 March 1955, passed as second degree mason, and raised to Master Mason.

== Political philosophy, ideology and views ==
Ichiro was critical of communism and of military planned economy as his grandson Yukio Hatoyama wrote for an article.

== Honours ==
From the corresponding article in the Japanese Wikipedia

- Grand Cordon of the Order of the Chrysanthemum (1959; posthumous)

== See also ==
- Hatomander

Political offices
Preceded by Shigeru Yoshida	Prime Minister of Japan; 1954–1956	Succeeded by Tanzan Ishibashi
Preceded by Ryūzō Tanaka	Minister of Education; 1931–1934	Succeeded by Makoto Saitō
Preceded by Seiji Tsukamoto	Chief Cabinet Secretary; 1927–1929	Succeeded by Fujiya Suzuki
Party political offices
Preceded by Himself; Tsuruhei Matsuno; Bukichi Miki; Banboku Ōno	President of the Liberal Democratic Party; 1956	Succeeded by Tanzan Ishibashi
New political party	President of the Liberal Democratic Party; 1955–1956; Served alongside: Taketora Ogata, Bukichi Miki, Banboku Ōno, Tsuruhei Matsuno	Succeeded by Himself
New political party	President of the Japan Democratic Party; 1954–1955	"Conservative merger" with Liberal Party
New political party	President of the Liberal Party; 1945–1946 (purged)	Succeeded by Shigeru Yoshida
Preceded by Kisaburō Suzuki	Acting President of Rikken Seiyūkai; 1937–1939; Served alongside: Yonezō Maeda, Toshio Shimada, Chikuhei Nakajima	Succeeded by Fusanosuke Kuhara; Chikuhei Nakajima
Preceded by Yonezō Maeda	Secretary General of Rikken Seiyūkai; 1926–1927	Succeeded by Jōtaro Yamamoto
House of Representatives (Japan)
Preceded by Sanzō Nosaka...	Representative for Tokyo's 1st district (multi-member); 1952–1959; Served alongside: Inejirō Asanuma, several others	Succeeded by Seiichirō Yasui...
New title New constituency	Representative for Tokyo's 1st district (multi-member); 1946–1946 (purged)/1947 Served alongside: Inejirō Asanuma, Sanzō Nosaka numerous others	District eliminated
New title New constituency	Representative for Tokyo's 2nd district (multi-member); 1928–1943 (retired)/1946 Served alongside: Isoo Abe, Takeru Inukai, numerous others	District eliminated
New title New constituency	Representative for Tokyo's 10th district 1920–1928	District eliminated
Preceded by Masutarō Takagi...	Representative for Tokyo's Tokyo city district (multi-member); 1915–1920; Served alongside: Bukichi Miki, Keikichi Tanomogi, numerous others	District eliminated
