= Fukui at-large district (House of Representatives) =

Electoral district in Japan

The Fukui at-large district (Japanese: 福井県全県区, Hepburn: Fukui-ken Zenken-ku) was a multi-member electoral district represented in the House of Representatives in the National Diet of Japan. From 1947 until 1993, it elected four representatives from Fukui Prefecture.

== History ==
In the 1947 Japanese general election, three of the four seats were won by the Democratic Party. In 1949 all seats were won by the Democratic Party and Democratic Liberal Party, both of which would later merge into the Liberal Party. After that party won all the seats in the 1952 Japanese general election, there would later be a trend in which conservative parties, including the Liberal Democratic Party, would win at least half of the district's seats. Koshiro Ueki, who was part of the cabinet as Minister of Justice (1960–1962; 1971) and Minister of Finance (1972), was elected to the district in the 1952 election and would later be re-elected eight more times, before losing in the 1976 Japanese general election. Due to the 1994 Japanese electoral reform, the at-large district was replaced with three single-member districts starting with the 1996 Japanese general election.

At the time the Public Offices Election Law came into law in 1950, the district encompassed the entirely of Fukui Prefecture.

== Results ==
1947
Party	Candidate	Votes	%	±%
Democratic	Masatomo Hasegawa	42,371	14.2	New
Democratic	Shinzō Tsubokawa	33,577	11.3	New
Other	Kichidayū Katō	30,777	10.3	New
Democratic	Seizaemon Aoki	28,587	9.6	New
Socialist	Shigeichi Saiki	23,158	7.8	New
Socialist	Yoshio Dōmori	22,877	7.7	New
Socialist	Matajūrō Okumura	22,829	7.7	New
Democratic	Yomiji Ii	21,786	7.3	New
Liberal	Hajime Fukuda	20,545	6.9	New
Democratic	Tsuru Ueyama	14,191	4.8	New
Democratic	Niemon Kawamura	8,080	2.7	New
Liberal	Tamotsu Moriwaki	8,065	2.7	New
Socialist	Akira Yamagishi	7,331	2.5	New
Independent	Kiyoshi Ōkubo	4,457	1.5	New
JCP	Rinji Nishimura	4,325	1.4	New
Liberal	Hatsu Imai	2,882	1.0	New
Independent	Yoshinori Saitō	2,538	0.9	New

1949
Party	Candidate	Votes	%	±%
Democratic Liberal	Shigeshi Tobishima	38,815	12.0	New
Democratic Liberal	Hajime Fukuda	36,624	11.3	New
Democratic	Shinzō Tsubokawa	34,561	10.7	−3.5
Democratic	Matajūrō Okumura	31,250	9.7	−1.6
Democratic Liberal	Kurō Fujii	28,722	8.9	New
Socialist	Yoshio Dōmori	28,063	8.7	+1.0
Farmers' Federation	Yoshihisa Miyake	26,438	8.2	New
Democratic	Masatomo Hasegawa	24,728	7.6	−2.0
Farmers' New Party	Kichidayū Katō	21,253	6.6	New
Socialist	Shigeichi Saiki	17,797	5.5	+3.0
Quasi-Democratic Liberal Party	Yomiji Ii	13,580	4.2	New
JCP	Eiichi Ochiai	9,886	3.1	+1.7
Democratic	Seizaemon Aoki	9,293	2.9	−4.4
Independent	Sakon Ishida	2,711	0.8	New

1952
Party	Candidate	Votes	%	±%
Liberal	Koshiro Ueki	66,014	18.4	New
Liberal	Matajūrō Okumura	52,457	14.6	New
Liberal	Hajime Fukuda	49,738	13.9	New
Liberal	Shinzō Tsubokawa	49,224	13.7	New
Left Socialist	Shigeichi Saiki	49,054	13.7	New
Independent	Mataemon Itō	30,140	8.4	New
Kaishintō	Yūji Satsuma	30,136	8.4	New
Kaishintō	Seizō Ide	18,717	5.2	New
Kaishintō	Seizaemon Aoki	5,597	1.6	New
Independent	Toshitake Ueda	4,189	1.2	New
JCP	Eiichi Ochiai	3,356	0.9	−2.2

1953
Party	Candidate	Votes	%	±%
Left Socialist	Shigeichi Saiki	57,434	16.4	+2.7
Liberal	Hajime Fukuda	52,395	15.0	−3.4
Liberal	Koshiro Ueki	52,189	14.9	+0.3
Liberal	Shinzō Tsubokawa	49,550	14.2	+0.3
Liberal	Matajūrō Okumura	46,967	13.4	−0.3
Kaishintō	Yūji Satsuma	45,694	13.1	+4.7
Right Socialist	Yūji Takagi	25,207	7.2	New
Independent	Masatomo Hasegawa	15,369	4.4	New
JCP	Eiichi Ochiai	2,747	0.8	−0.1
Liberal Party–Hatoyama	Sakon Ishida	1,880	0.5	New

1955
Party	Candidate	Votes	%	±%
Liberal	Matajūrō Okumura	67,043	18.6	+3.6
Democratic	Yūji Satsuma	63,975	17.7	New
Liberal	Koshiro Ueki	54,825	15.2	+0.3
Right Socialist	Yoshio Dōmori	54,003	15.0	+7.8
Left Socialist	Shigeichi Saiki	50,080	13.9	−2.5
Liberal	Hajime Fukuda	45,831	12.7	−1.5
Democratic	Mataemon Itō	18,417	5.1	New
Independent	Hatsu Imai	4,236	1.2	New
Independent	Takehiro Maeda	2,177	0.6	New

1958
Party	Candidate	Votes	%	±%
LDP	Koshiro Ueki	65,760	17.6	New
LDP	Matajūrō Okumura	59,070	15.9	New
LDP	Hajime Fukuda	58,831	15.8	New
Socialist	Yoshio Dōmori	57,082	15.3	New
LDP	Shinzō Tsubokawa	50,236	13.5	New
Socialist	Masaichirō Tabata	44,672	12.0	New
LDP	Yūji Satsuma	34,015	9.1	New
JCP	Eiichi Ochiai	2,965	0.8	New

1960
Party	Candidate	Votes	%	±%
LDP	Koshiro Ueki	69,381	18.7	+1.1
LDP	Hajime Fukuda	67,088	18.1	+2.2
Socialist	Yoshio Dōmori	66,727.51	18.0	+2.7
LDP	Yūji Satsuma	54,403	14.7	−1.1
LDP	Matajūrō Okumura	53,455	14.4	+0.9
Socialist	Masaichirō Tabata	43,715	11.8	−0.2
Democratic Socialist	Yoshio Mantani	11,588.49	3.1	New
JCP	Eiichi Ochiai	3,808	1.0	+0.2

1963
Party	Candidate	Votes	%	±%
LDP	Hajime Fukuda	79,751	20.4	+1.7
LDP	Shinzō Tsubokawa	64,162	16.4	−1.7
LDP	Koshiro Ueki	62,904	16.1	+1.4
Socialist	Yoshio Dōmori	56,652	14.5	−3.5
Socialist	Masaichirō Tabata	49,230	12.6	+0.8
LDP	Yūji Satsuma	47,604	12.2	−2.2
Aoba-kai	Shinpei Yamatani	19,642	5.0	New
Independent	Narumi Ide	6,921	1.8	New
JCP	Eiichi Ochiai	3,834	1.0	0.0

1967
Party	Candidate	Votes	%	±%
LDP	Hajime Fukuda	81,147	21.4	+1.0
LDP	Koshiro Ueki	75,993	20.0	+3.6
Socialist	Yoshio Dōmori	74,329	19.6	+5.1
LDP	Shinzō Tsubokawa	71,541	18.8	+2.7
Socialist	Keiichi Saitō	68,816	18.1	+5.5
JCP	Eiichi Ochiai	8,216	2.2	+1.2

1969
Party	Candidate	Votes	%	±%
LDP	Shinzō Tsubokawa	81,339	20.8	−0.6
LDP	Koshiro Ueki	75,297	19.2	−0.8
LDP	Hajime Fukuda	65,277	16.7	−2.1
Socialist	Yoshio Dōmori	65,079	16.6	−3.0
Socialist	Keiichi Saitō	49,488	12.6	−5.5
Democratic Socialist	Yoshinobu Matsuzaki	46,679	11.9	New
JCP	Eiichi Ochiai	7,635	1.9	−0.3
Rikken Yōseikai	Iku Katō	1,173	0.3	New

1972
Party	Candidate	Votes	%	±%
LDP	Shinzō Tsubokawa	87,595	21.1	+0.3
LDP	Hajime Fukuda	81,991	19.8	+0.6
LDP	Koshiro Ueki	81,710	19.7	+3.0
Socialist	Yoshio Dōmori	68,162	16.5	−0.1
Socialist	Masaichirō Tabata	60,543	14.6	+2.0
JCP	Akira Sakaguchi	17,281	4.2	+2.3
Independent	Akira Takeuchi	15,734	3.8	New
Independent	Masao Shigeno	1,251	0.3	New

1976
Party	Candidate	Votes	%	±%
LDP	Hajime Fukuda	65,370	14.2	−6.9
Independent	Wataru Hiraizumi	65,134	14.1	New
LDP	Shinzō Tsubokawa	59,551	12.9	−6.9
Socialist	Masaichirō Tabata	53,554	11.6	−4.9
Independent	Takamori Makino	49,335	10.7	New
Socialist	Yoshio Dōmori	48,939	10.6	−4.0
LDP	Koshiro Ueki	41,920	9.1	−10.6
Democratic Socialist	Fumio Yokote	29,036	6.3	New
Kōmeitō	Hironori Nakano	26,329	5.7	New
JCP	Akira Sakaguchi	12,530	2.7	−1.5
Independent	Akira Takeuchi	10,061	2.2	−1.6

1979
Party	Candidate	Votes	%	±%
LDP	Hajime Fukuda	105,061	25.2	+11.0
Socialist	Masaichirō Tabata	80,537	19.3	+7.7
LDP	Takamori Makino	78,485	18.8	+5.9
Democratic Socialist	Fumio Yokote	76,233	18.3	+12.0
LDP	Wataru Hiraizumi	62,930	15.1	+6.0
JCP	Shōichirō Motoyama	13,237	3.2	+0.5

1980
Party	Candidate	Votes	%	±%
LDP	Takamori Makino	106,258	22.6	−2.6
LDP	Wataru Hiraizumi	102,321	21.7	+2.9
LDP	Hajime Fukuda	94,175	20.0	+4.9
Democratic Socialist	Fumio Yokote	79,878	17.0	−1.3
Socialist	Masaichirō Tabata	78,382	16.6	−2.7
JCP	Shōichirō Motoyama	10,095	2.1	−1.1

1983
Party	Candidate	Votes	%	±%
LDP	Hajime Fukuda	106,285	24.1	+1.5
LDP	Wataru Hiraizumi	68,923	15.6	−6.1
Independent	Kazuhiko Tsuji	59,654	13.5	New
Democratic Socialist	Fumio Yokote	59,523	13.5	−3.5
LDP	Takamori Makino	56,250	12.8	−7.2
Socialist	Masaichirō Tabata	50,320	11.4	−5.2
Independent	Fujio Tateyama	31,544	7.2	New
JCP	Shōichirō Motoyama	7,967	1.8	−0.3

1986
Party	Candidate	Votes	%	±%
LDP	Takamori Makino	101,106	21.6	−2.5
Independent	Kazuhiko Tsuji	96,949	20.7	+7.2
LDP	Hajime Fukuda	95,104	20.3	+4.7
LDP	Wataru Hiraizumi	81,960	17.5	+4.7
Independent	Fumio Yokote	56,489	12.1	New
Independent	Fujio Tateyama	24,687	5.3	−1.9
JCP	Shūichi Minami	12,311	2.6	+0.8

1990
Party	Candidate	Votes	%	±%
LDP	Takamori Makino	84,785	16.9	−4.7
Socialist	Kazuhiko Tsuji	84,062	16.8	New
LDP	Wataru Hiraizumi	71,654	14.3	−6.0
LDP	Taku Yamamoto	62,293	12.4	−5.1
Independent	Teruo Fukuda	59,776	11.9	New
Democratic Socialist	Heiichi Nakagawa	57,191	11.4	New
Independent	Masaru Sakagawa	40,801	8.1	New
JCP	Sachie Kanemoto	20,543	4.1	+1.5
Independent	Ryuzo Sasaki	20,305	4.0	New

1993
Party	Candidate	Votes	%	±%
LDP	Taku Yamamoto	103,901	22.2	+5.3
Independent	Ryuzo Sasaki	97,382	20.8	+16.8
Socialist	Kazuhiko Tsuji	85,524	18.3	+1.5
LDP	Wataru Hiraizumi	81,054	17.3	+3.0
LDP	Takamori Makino	80,400	17.2	+4.8
JCP	Sachie Kanemoto	19,973	4.3	+0.2
Turnout		617,444	76.47	
