= 1955 Japanese general election =

← 1953	27 February 1955	1958 →

All 467 seats in the House of Representatives 234 seats needed for a majority
- Turnout: 75.83% (▲1.62pp)
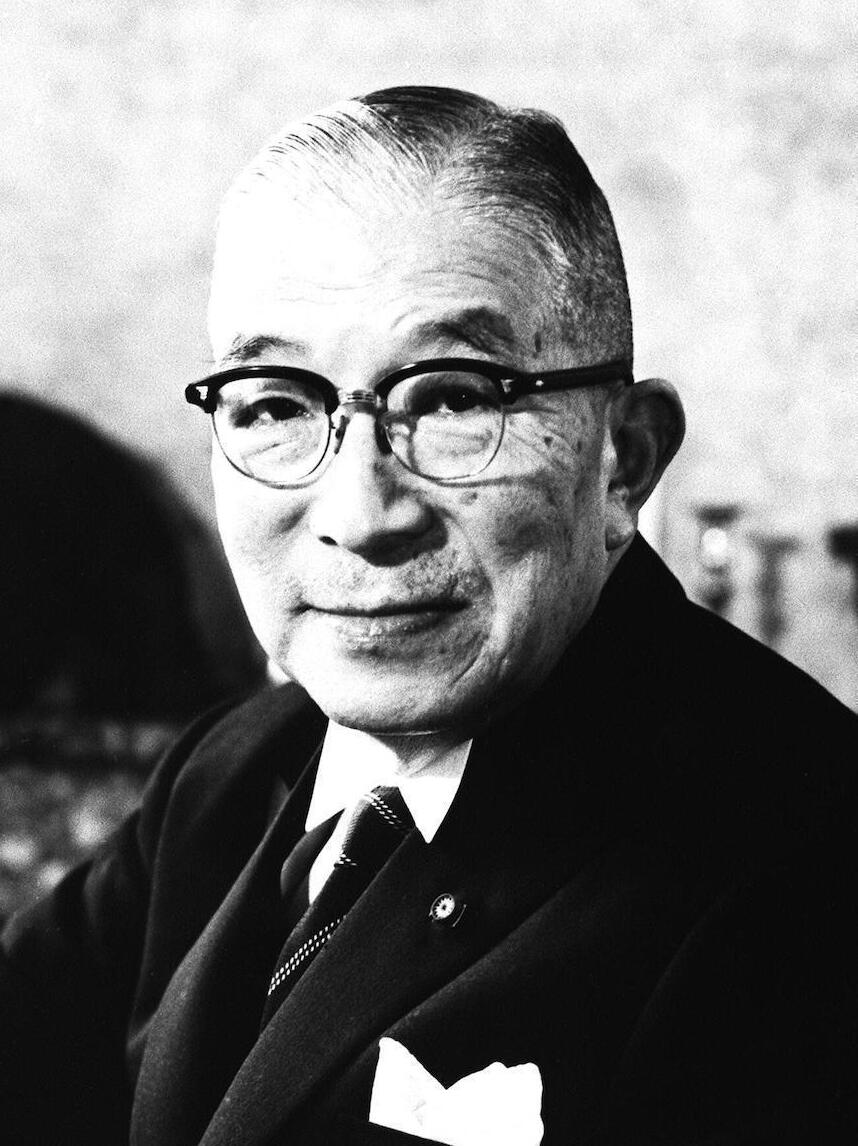

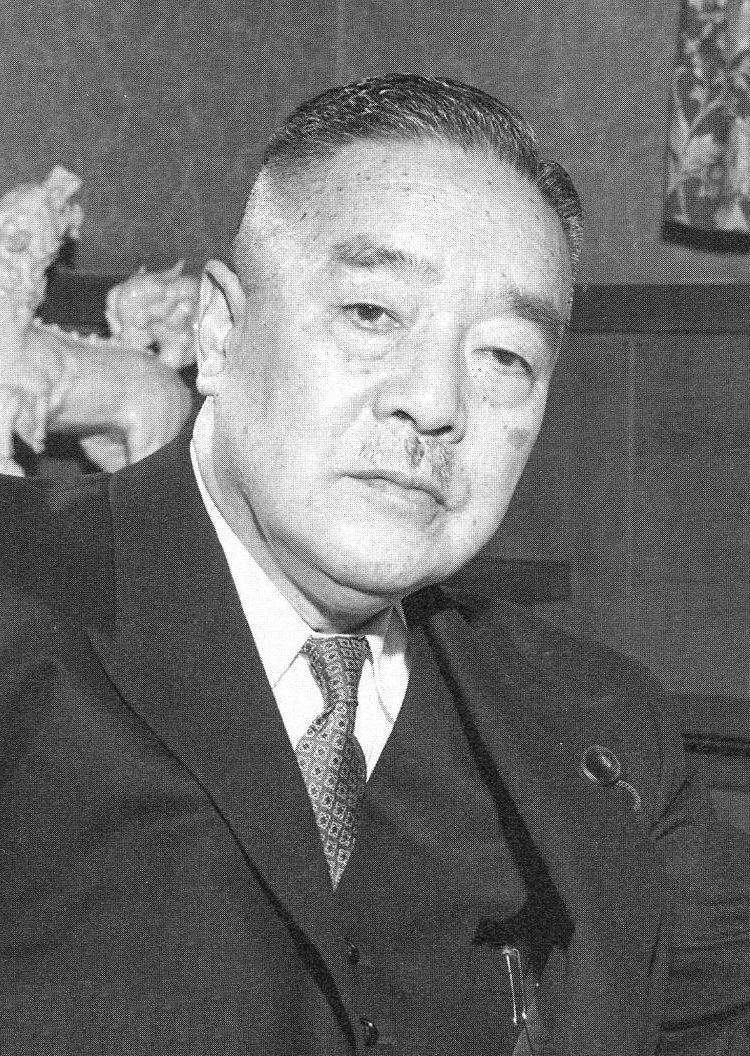

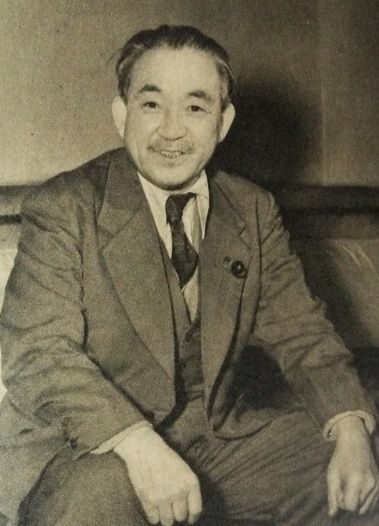

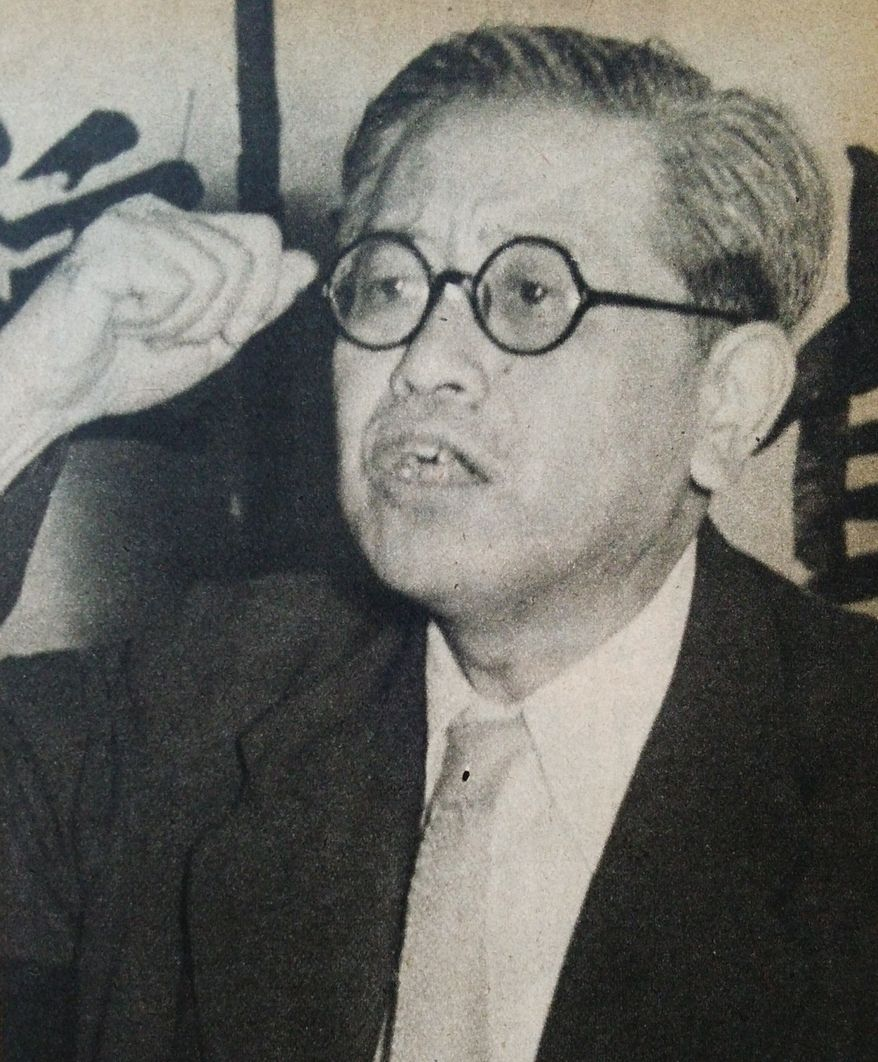
	First party	Second party
Leader	Ichirō Hatoyama	Taketora Ogata
Party	Democratic	Liberal
Last election	26.71%, 111 seats (Note: Kaishintō and Liberal Party–Hatoyama)	38.95%, 199 seats
Seats won	185	112
Seat change	▲74	▼87
Popular vote	13,536,044	9,849,458
Percentage	36.57%	26.61%
Swing	▲9.86pp	▼12.34pp
	Third party	Fourth party
Leader	Mosaburō Suzuki	Jōtarō Kawakami
Party	Left Socialist	Right Socialist
Last election	13.05%, 72 seats	13.52%, 66 seats
Seats won	89	67
Seat change	▲17	▲1
Popular vote	5,683,312	5,129,594
Percentage	15.35%	13.86%
Swing	▲2.30pp	▲0.34pp
- Districts shaded according to winners' vote strength
Prime Minister before election
Ichirō Hatoyama
Democratic
Elected Prime Minister
Ichirō Hatoyama
Democratic

General elections were held in Japan on 27 February 1955. The result was a victory for the Japan Democratic Party, which won 185 of the 467 seats. Voter turnout was 76%.

On 15 November 1955, the Japan Democratic Party and the Liberal Party combined as the modern Liberal Democratic Party, which ruled Japan continuously until 1993. The Rightist Socialist Party of Japan and the Leftist Socialist Party of Japan also merged to form the Japan Socialist Party, which was Japan's largest opposition party in the 1955 system.

== Results ==
Party	Votes	%	Seats	+/–
Democratic Party	13,536,044	36.57	185	+74
Liberal Party	9,849,458	26.61	112	−87
Left Socialist Party of Japan	5,683,312	15.35	89	+17
Right Socialist Party of Japan	5,129,594	13.86	67	+1
Japanese Communist Party	733,121	1.98	2	+1
Labourers and Farmers Party	357,611	0.97	4	−1
Other parties	496,614	1.34	2	–
Independents	1,229,082	3.32	6	−5
Total	37,014,836	100.00	467	+1
Valid votes	37,014,836	99.14		
Invalid/blank votes	319,499	0.86		
Total votes	37,334,335	100.00		
Registered voters/turnout	49,235,375	75.83		
Source: Oscarsson, Masumi

=== By prefecture ===
Prefecture	Total seats	Seats won							
Prefecture	Total seats	DP	LP	LSPJ	RSPJ	LFP	JCP	Others	Ind.
Aichi	19	6	6	6	1				
Akita	8	5		1	2				
Aomori	7	5	1	1					
Chiba	13	7	3	2	1				
Ehime	9	3	3	2	1				
Fukui	4	1	2		1				
Fukuoka	19	4	4	6	5				
Fukushima	12	3	3	1	4			1	
Gifu	9	4	3	2					
Gunma	10	6	1	3					
Hiroshima	12	5	4	1	2				
Hokkaido	22	8	5	6	1	1			1
Hyōgo	18	9	1	3	5				
Ibaraki	12	6	3	1	1	1			
Ishikawa	6	3	2		1				
Iwate	8	3	3	1	1				
Kagawa	6	3	1	1	1				
Kagoshima	11	5	3	2	1				
Kanagawa	13	6	1	3	3				
Kōchi	5	1	2	1	1				
Kumamoto	10	3	4	2	1				
Kyoto	10	4	2	3	1				
Mie	9	5	2		2				
Miyagi	9	3	2	1	3				
Miyazaki	6	1	4	1					
Nagano	13	5	2	2	3				1
Nagasaki	9	3	3	2	1				
Nara	5	1	2	1	1				
Niigata	15	5	5	4	1				
Ōita	7	4	1	1	1				
Okayama	10	4	3	2		1			
Osaka	19	4	3	4	5		2		1
Saga	5	1	2	2					
Saitama	13	3	5		4				1
Shiga	5	2	1		1			1	
Shimane	5	2	1	1	1				
Shizuoka	14	4	6	3		1			
Tochigi	10	4	3	1	2				
Tokushima	5	3	1	1					
Tokyo	27	14	1	6	6				
Tottori	4	2	1	1					
Toyama	6	4		1					1
Wakayama	6	3	1	2					
Yamagata	8	3	3	2					
Yamaguchi	9	3	2	2	2				
Yamanashi	5	2	1	1					1
Total	467	185	112	89	67	4	2	2	6
