= Hatsu Imai =

Japanese politician

- 今井 はつ

Member of the House of Representatives
- In office 10 April 1946 – 31 March 1947
- Preceded by: Constituency established
- Succeeded by: Multi-member district
- Constituency: Fukui at-large

Personal details
- Born: 3 May 1901 Ōno, Fukui, Japan
- Died: 6 April 1971 (aged 69)
- Party: Liberal
- Education: Meiji University

Hatsu Imai (Japanese: 今井はつ, 3 May 1901 – 6 April 1971) was a Japanese teacher, journalist and politician. She was one of the first group of women elected to the House of Representatives in 1946.

== Biography ==
Imai was born in Katsuyama in Ōno District in 1901, and attended Shimizudani Girl's High School. After marrying, she moved to Shikoku, where she worked as a substitute teacher for a high school and as a newspaper reporter. She later moved to Tokyo, where she opened a sewing school, before returning to Fukui Prefecture due to the damage caused to Tokyo during World War II.

She was a Liberal Party candidate in Fukui in the 1946 general elections and was one of the first group of women elected to the House of Representatives. However, she resigned from the House soon after the elections after being charged with falsifying her educational background on documents submitted during the election. She failed to be re-elected in the 1947 elections and unsuccessfully ran as an independent in Tokyo in the 1949 elections.

After leaving parliament, Imai studied journalism at Meiji University, graduating in 1950. She subsequently worked as an expert advisor to the Youth Affairs Council of the Prime Minister's Office. She died in 1971.
