= Japanese Democratic Party =

Japanese Democratic Party can refer to:

- Democratic Party (Japan, 1947)
- Japan Democratic Party (1954)
- Democratic Party of Japan (1996)
- Democratic Party of Japan (1998–2016)
- Democratic Party (Japan) (2016–2018)

== See also ==
- List of political parties in Japan
