= Labourers and Farmers Party =

Labourers and Farmers Party 労働者農民党 Rōdōsha Nōmintō
- Founded: 1948
- Dissolved: 1957
- Split from: Japan Socialist Party
- Merged into: Japan Socialist Party
- Headquarters: Tokyo

The Labourers and Farmers Party (Japanese: 労働者農民党, Hepburn: Rōdōsha Nōmintō) was a political party in Japan. It was active from 1948 until 1957.

== History ==
The party was established in December 1948 by members of the Socialist Party Orthodox Faction Diet Members' Group, which was formed by 16 National Diet members who had resigned or been expelled from the Japan Socialist Party after voting against the budget proposed by the Democratic Party–Socialist government due to their opposition to an increase in public transport fares. It was particularly well-supported in Okayama and Hokkaido where party president Hisao Kuroda and Haruo Okada were based, and was supported by some members of the National Railwaymen's Union and National Communications Workers' Union.

It won only seven seats in the January 1949 elections, and was further reduced in size by three defections over the party's unclear stance on the Korean War. It won two seats in the 1950 House of Councillors elections, and retained its four remaining seats in the House of Representatives in the 1952 general elections.

In the 1953 elections it won five seats in the House of Representatives, but failed to win a seats in the simultaneous House of Councillors elections. The 1955 elections saw the party reduced to three Diet members and lost its representation in the House of Councillors in the 1956 elections.

The party was dissolved in January 1957 when its 2,000 members joined the Socialist Party.

== Election results ==
=== House of Representatives ===
Election	Leader	Votes	%	Seats	+/–	Position	Status
1949	Hisao Kuroda	606,840	1.98	7 / 466	new	6th	Opposition
1952	Hisao Kuroda	261,190	0.74	4 / 466	▼3	6th	Opposition
1953	Hisao Kuroda	358,773	1.04	5 / 466	▲1	7th	Opposition
1955	Hisao Kuroda	357,611	0.97	5 / 467	▼1	6th	Opposition

=== House of Councillors ===
Election	Leader	Constituency				Party list				Seats				Position	Status
Election	Leader	Votes	%	Seats	+/-	Votes	%	Seats	+/-	Won	+/-	Total	+/-	Position	Status
1950	Ichirō Matsui	471,649	1.63	1 / 76	new	200,066	0.71	1 / 56	new	2 / 132	new	5 / 250	▼3	6th	Opposition
1953	Ichirō Matsui	277,442	0.99	0 / 75	new	112,535	0.42	0 / 53	new	0 / 128	new	2 / 250	▼3	7th	Opposition
1956	Ichirō Matsui	120,414	0.41	0 / 75	▼1	181,524	0.63	0 / 53	▼1	0 / 128	▼2	0 / 250	▼2	5th	Opposition
