= 1953 Japanese House of Councillors election =

- 24 April 1953

128 of the 250 seats in the House of Councillors 126 seats needed for a majority
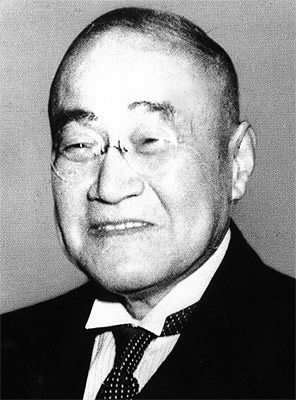

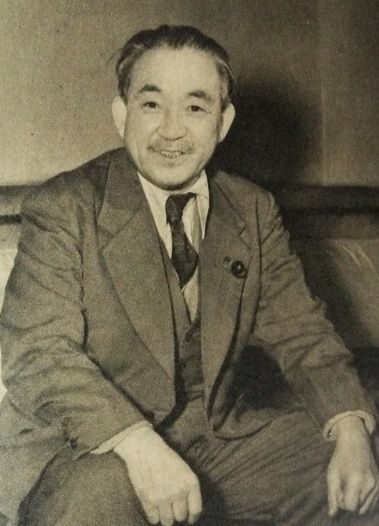

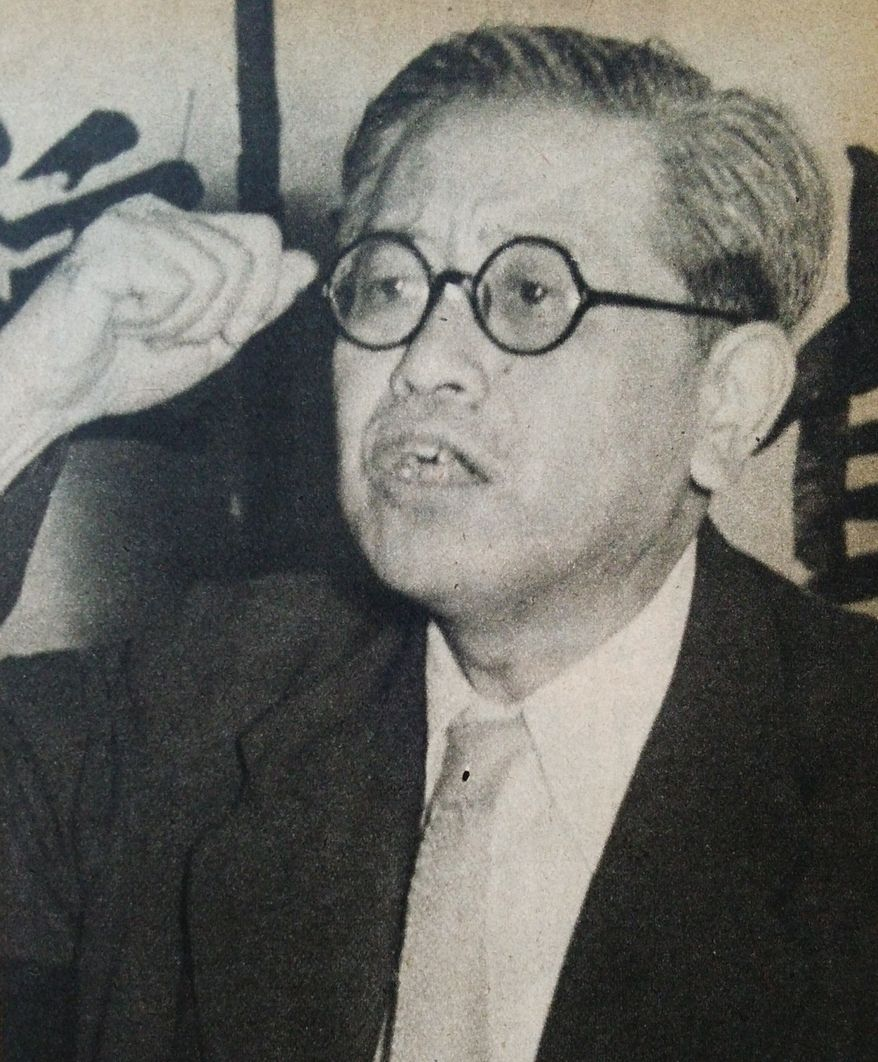

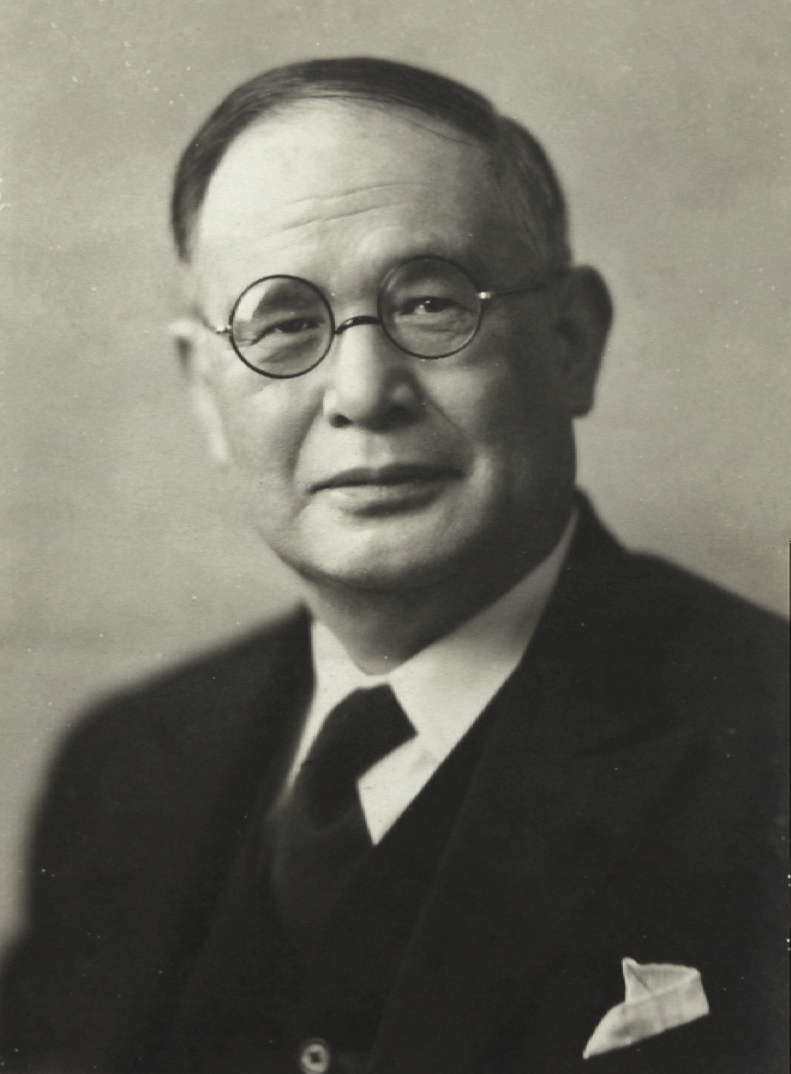
	First party	Second party	Third party
Leader	Shigeru Yoshida	Mosaburō Suzuki
Party	Liberal	Left Socialist	Ryokufūkai
Seats after	93	40	34
Seat change	▲17	New	▼16
Popular vote	6,149,927	3,917,837	3,301,011
Percentage	22.7%	14.3%	12.2%
Swing	▼6.6%	N/A	▼0.9%
	Fourth party	Fifth party
Leader	Jōtarō Kawakami	Mamoru Shigemitsu
Party	Right Socialist	Kaishintō
Seats after	26	15
Seat change	New	New
Popular vote	1,740,423	1,630,507
Percentage	6.4%	6.0%
Swing	New	N/A
- Results of the election, showing the winning candidates in each prefecture and the national block.
President of the House of Councillors before election
Naotake Satō
Ryokufūkai
President of the House of Councillors-designate
Yahachi Kawai
Ryokufūkai

House of Councillors elections were held in Japan on 24 April 1953, electing half the seats in the House. The Yoshida faction of the Liberal Party won the most seats.

== Results ==
Party	National			Constituency			Seats			
Party	Votes	%	Seats	Votes	%	Seats	Not up	Won	Total after	+/–
Liberal Party	6,149,927	22.75	16	8,803,131	31.43	30	47	46	93	+17
Left Socialist Party of Japan	3,858,552	14.27	8	3,917,837	13.99	10	22	18	40	New
Ryokufūkai	3,301,011	12.21	8	2,096,103	7.48	8	18	16	34	–16
Right Socialist Party of Japan	1,740,423	6.44	3	2,952,803	10.54	7	16	10	26	New
Kaishintō	1,630,507	6.03	3	2,840,345	10.14	5	7	8	15	New
Japanese Communist Party	293,877	1.09	0	264,729	0.95	0	1	0	1	–3
Labourers and Farmers Party	112,535	0.42	0	277,442	0.99	0	2	0	2	–3
Liberal Party–Hatoyama	110,889	0.41	0	522,540	1.87	0	2	0	2	New
Other parties	332,898	1.23	0	322,674	1.15	1	0	1	1	–2
Independents	9,504,220	35.16	15	6,013,363	21.47	14	7	29	36	+14
Total	27,034,839	100.00	53	28,010,967	100.00	75	122	128	250	0
Valid votes	27,034,839	90.97		28,010,967	94.25					
Invalid/blank votes	2,682,584	9.03		1,707,952	5.75					
Total votes	29,717,423	100.00		29,718,919	100.00					
Registered voters/turnout	47,036,554	63.18		47,036,554	63.18					
Source: Ministry of Internal Affairs and Communications, National Diet

=== By constituency ===
Prefecture	Total seats	Seats won						
Prefecture	Total seats	LP	LSPJ	Ryokufūkai	RSPJ	Kaishintō	Others	Ind.
Aichi	3	1	1					1
Akita	1	1						
Aomori	1			1				
Chiba	2	1						1
Ehime	1						1	
Fukui	1	1						
Fukuoka	3	1	1	1				
Fukushima	2	1			1			
Gifu	1	1						
Gunma	2	1				1		
Hiroshima	2	1			1			
Hokkaido	4	1	1			1		1
Hyōgo	3	1	1		1			
Ibaraki	2	1				1		
Ishikawa	1					1		
Iwate	1	1						
Kagawa	1							1
Kagoshima	2	2						
Kanagawa	2				1			1
Kōchi	1	1						
Kumamoto	2	1				1		
Kyoto	2	1	1					
Mie	1			1				
Miyagi	1	1						
Miyazaki	1			1				
Nagano	2	1	1					
Nagasaki	1	1						
Nara	1							1
Niigata	2	1		1				
Ōita	1							1
Okayama	2		1	1				
Osaka	3		1	1	1			
Saga	1	1						
Saitama	2	1			1			
Shiga	1		1					
Shimane	1	1						
Shizuoka	2	1						1
Tochigi	2	1			1			
Tokushima	1							1
Tokyo	4	2	1					1
Tottori	1							1
Toyama	1	1						
Wakayama	1	1						
Yamagata	1		1					
Yamaguchi	1							1
Yamanashi	1							1
National	53	16	8	8	3	3		15
Total	128	47	19	15	10	8	1	28

== Aftermath ==
In the national constituency, a polling station in Sano, Tochigi accidentally had Japan Socialist Party candidate Takeshi Hirabayashi labelled as belonging to the Japanese Communist Party. As a result, the results in Sano were invalidated through an appeal decision of the Supreme Court on 24 September 1954. A re-vote was held on 17 October 1954 with proper labels, and Hirabayashi narrowly won a spot in the lower ranks of the national constituency results.
