= 1958 Japanese general election =

- 22 May 1958

All 467 seats in the House of Representatives 234 seats needed for a majority
- Turnout: 76.98% (▲1.15pp)
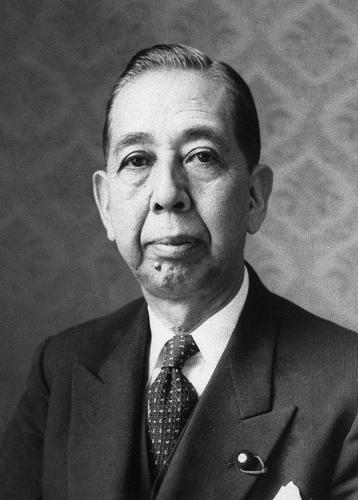

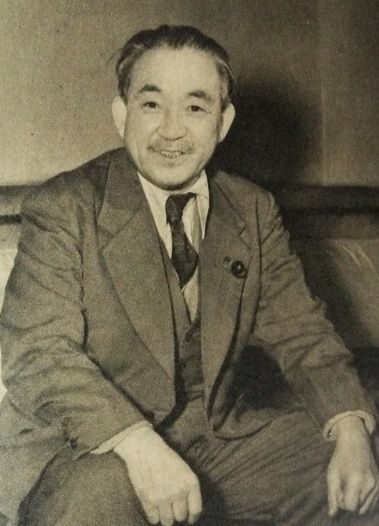
	First party	Second party
Leader	Nobusuke Kishi	Mosaburō Suzuki
Party	LDP	Socialist
Last election	63.18%, 297 seats (Note: Democratic Party and Liberal Party)	30.18%, 157 seats (Note: Left Socialist Party of Japan and Right Socialist Party of Japan)
Seats won	287	166
Seat change	▼10	▲9
Popular vote	22,976,846	13,093,993
Percentage	57.80%	32.94%
Swing	▼5.38pp	▲2.76pp
- Districts shaded according to winners' vote strength
Prime Minister before election
Nobusuke Kishi
LDP
Elected Prime Minister
Nobusuke Kishi
LDP

General elections were held in Japan on 22 May 1958. The result was a victory for the Liberal Democratic Party, which won 298 of the 467 seats. Voter turnout was 77.0%.

The Japan Socialist Party only ran 246 candidates. The Japanese Communist Party, which strategically withdrew some of its candidates in favor of the JSP in the 1956 elections, ran 114 candidates.

This election had the highest turnout for a post-war election so far.

== Results ==
Party	Votes	%	Seats	+/–
Liberal Democratic Party	22,976,846	57.80	287	−10
Japan Socialist Party	13,093,993	32.94	166	+6
Japanese Communist Party	1,012,036	2.55	1	−1
Other parties	287,991	0.72	1	–
Independents	2,380,795	5.99	12	+6
Total	39,751,661	100.00	467	0
Valid votes	39,751,661	99.27		
Invalid/blank votes	290,828	0.73		
Total votes	40,042,489	100.00		
Registered voters/turnout	52,013,529	76.98		
Source: Mackie, Masumi

=== By prefecture ===
Prefecture	Total seats	Seats won				
Prefecture	Total seats	LDP	JSP	JCP	Others	Ind.
Aichi	19	10	8			1
Akita	8	5	2			1
Aomori	7	4	2			1
Chiba	13	10	3			
Ehime	9	8	1			
Fukui	4	3	1			
Fukuoka	19	12	7			
Fukushima	12	7	4		1	
Gifu	9	5	4			
Gunma	10	7	3			
Hiroshima	12	9	2			1
Hokkaido	22	11	11			
Hyōgo	18	10	7			1
Ibaraki	12	8	4			
Ishikawa	6	5	1			
Iwate	8	5	2			1
Kagawa	6	4	2			
Kagoshima	11	8	2			1
Kanagawa	13	6	7			
Kōchi	5	4	1			
Kumamoto	10	7	3			
Kyoto	10	6	4			
Mie	9	5	4			
Miyagi	9	5	4			
Miyazaki	6	4	2			
Nagano	13	7	5			1
Nagasaki	9	5	3			1
Nara	5	2	1			2
Niigata	15	8	6			1
Ōita	7	5	2			
Okayama	10	6	4			
Osaka	19	11	7	1		
Saga	5	3	2			
Saitama	13	9	4			
Shiga	5	2	3			
Shimane	5	3	2			
Shizuoka	14	10	4			
Tochigi	10	6	4			
Tokushima	5	3	2			
Tokyo	27	12	15			
Tottori	4	3	1			
Toyama	6	4	2			
Wakayama	6	4	2			
Yamagata	8	6	2			
Yamaguchi	9	6	3			
Yamanashi	5	4	1			
Total	467	287	166	1	1	12

== Works cited ==
- Cole, Allan; Totten, George; Uyehara, Cecil (1966). Socialist Parties In Postwar Japan. Yale University Press.
