= House of Representatives (Japan) =

Lower house of Japan's National Diet

Coordinates: 35°40′31″N 139°44′42″E

House of Representatives 衆議院 Shūgiin
- 222nd Session of the National Diet

Type
- Type: Lower house of the National Diet

Leadership
- Speaker: Eisuke Mori, LDP since 18 February 2026
- Vice Speaker: Keiichi Ishii, Komeito since 18 February 2026
- Prime Minister: Sanae Takaichi, LDP since 21 October 2025
- Leader of the Opposition: Junya Ogawa, DRP since 13 February 2026

Structure
- Seats: 465
- Political groups: Government (Second Takaichi cabinet) (351): LDP (315) (Note: LDP (314); Independent (1)); JIP (36); Opposition (107): Centrists (47) (Note: Kōmeitō (27); DRP (18); CRA (1); Independent (1)); DPFP (28); Sanseitō (15); Team Mirai (11); JCP (4); Association of Patriots (2) (Note: Independent (2)); Unaffiliated (6): Independent (6) (Note: LDP (1/Speaker); Komeito (1/Vice Speaker); Life (1); Genzei–Yukoku (1); Independent (2)); Vacant (1): Vacant (1)
- Committees: 17 committees
- Length of term: Up to 4 years
- Salary: Speaker: ¥2,170,000/m Vice Speaker: ¥1,584,000/m Members: ¥1,294,000/m

Elections
- Voting system: Parallel voting: First-past-the-post voting (289 seats); Party-list proportional representation (176 seats)
- First election: 1 July 1890
- Last election: 8 February 2026
- Next election: By 8 February 2030

Meeting place
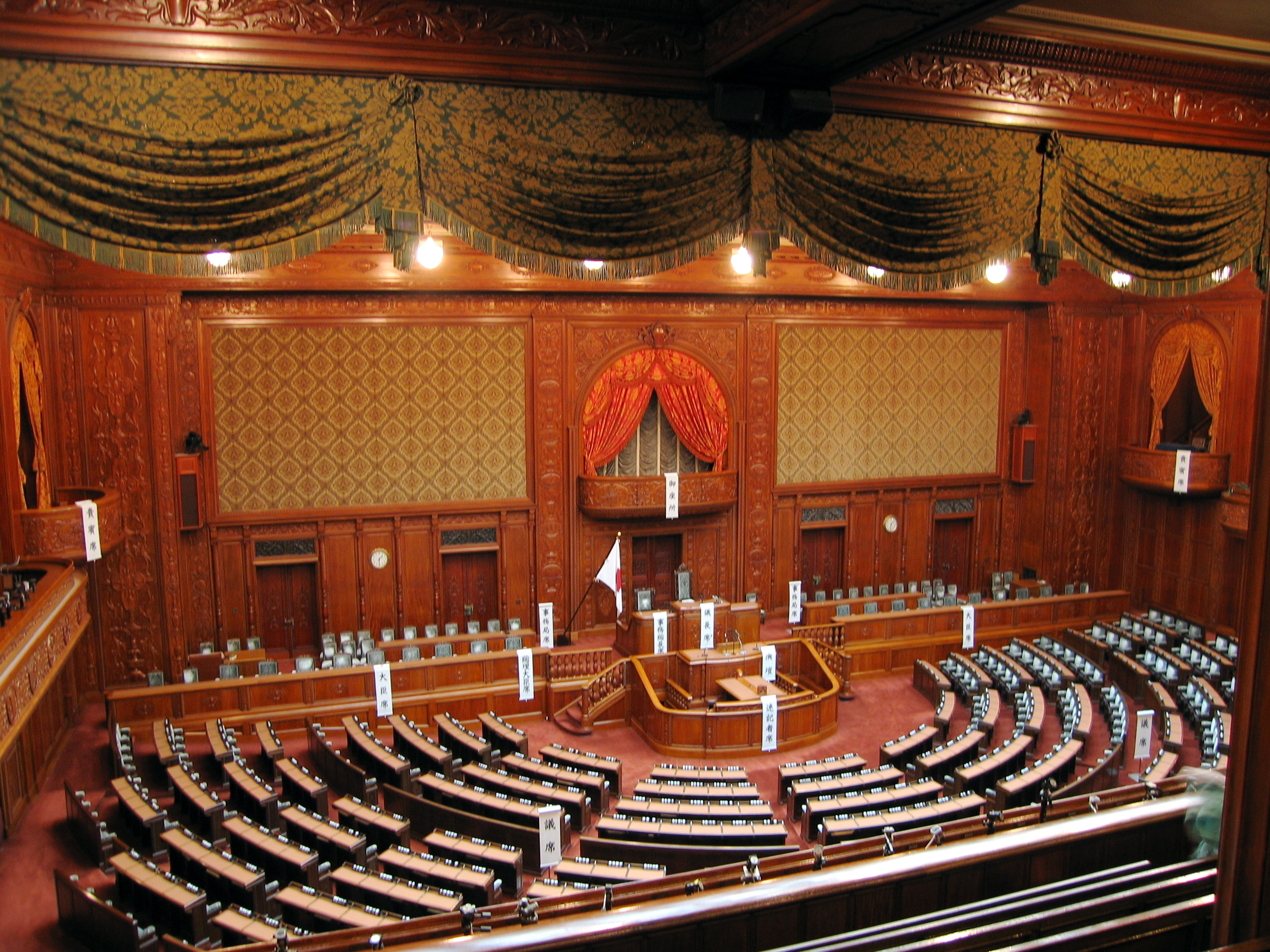
- Chamber of the House of Representatives

Website
- www.shugiin.go.jp

The House of Representatives (Japanese: 衆議院, Hepburn: Shūgiin; Japanese pronunciation: [ɕɯː.ɡʲiꜜ.iɴ, -ŋʲiꜜ-]) is the lower house of the National Diet of Japan. The Senate is the upper house. The composition of the House is established by Article 41 and Article 42 of the Constitution of Japan. The House of Representatives has 465 members, elected for a four-year term. Of these, 176 members are elected from 11 multi-member constituencies by a party-list system of proportional representation, and 289 are elected from single-member constituencies.

The overall voting system used to elect the House of Representatives is a parallel system, a form of semi-proportional representation. Under a parallel system, the allocation of list seats does not take into account the outcome in the single seat constituencies. Therefore, the overall allocation of seats in the House of Representatives is not fully proportional, to the advantage of larger parties.

The House of Representatives is the more powerful of the two houses, able to override vetoes on bills imposed by the Senate with a two-thirds majority. In the case of treaties, the budget, and the selection of the prime minister, the Senate can only delay passage, but not block the legislation. The most recent election for the House of Representatives was held on February 8, 2026, in which the Liberal Democratic Party won a super-majority of seats, over 316; in the previous election, they had failed to reach a majority of 233 seats, instead winning 191.

== Right to vote and candidature ==
The composition of the House is established by Article 41 and Article 42 of the Constitution of Japan.

- Japanese nationals aged 18 years and older may vote (prior to 2016, the voting age was 20).
- Japanese nationals aged 25 years and older may run for office in the lower house.

== Differences between the Upper and Lower Houses ==
The House of Representatives is the more powerful of the two houses. The House of Representatives has several powers not given to the Senate. If a bill is passed by the lower house (the House of Representatives) but is voted down by the upper house (the Senate) the House of Representatives can override the decision of the Senate by a two-thirds vote in the affirmative. However, in the case of treaties, the budget, and the selection of the prime minister, the Senate can only delay passage, but not block the legislation. As a result, the House of Representatives is considered the more powerful house.

Members of the House of Representatives, who are elected to a maximum of four years, sit for a shorter term than senators, who are elected to full six-year terms. The lower house can also be dissolved by the Prime Minister or the passage of a nonconfidence motion, while the Senate cannot be dissolved. Thus the House of Representatives is considered to be more sensitive to public opinion, and is termed the "lower house". While the legislative term is nominally 4 years, early elections for the lower house are very common, and the median lifespan of postwar legislatures has in practice been around 3 years.

== Current composition ==
Composition of the House of Representatives of Japan (as of 25 September 2026)
Parliamentary groups/caucuses	Parties	Seats
Liberal Democratic Party / Assembly of Independents; Jiyūminshutō・Mushozoku no Kai	Liberal Democratic Party (LDP); Independents	315
Centrists; Chūdō	Komeito; Democratic Reform Party; Centrist Reform Alliance; Independents	47
Nippon Ishin no Kai; Nippon Ishin no Kai	Nippon Ishin no Kai	36
Democratic Party for the People / Independent Club; Kokumin Minshutō・Mushozoku Kurabu	Democratic Party For the People (DPFP)	28
Sanseitō; Sanseitō	Sanseitō	15
Team Mirai; Chīmu Mirai	Team Mirai	11
Japanese Communist Party; Nihon Kyōsantō	Japanese Communist Party (JCP)	4
Independents (not member of a caucus); Mushozoku	LDP (Speaker); CRA (Vice Speaker); Independents (not member of a party); Party of Life; Tax Cuts Japan and Yukoku Alliance	8
Vacant	Casual vacancy	1
Total		465

== Latest election result ==
Party	Proportional			Constituency			Total seats	+/–
Party	Votes	%	Seats	Votes	%	Seats	Total seats	+/–
Liberal Democratic Party	21,026,139	36.72	67	27,710,493	49.09	249	316	+125
Centrist Reform Alliance	10,438,801	18.23	42	12,209,642	21.63	7	49	–123
Democratic Party For the People	5,572,951	9.73	20	4,243,282	7.52	8	28	0
Japan Innovation Party	4,943,330	8.63	16	3,742,161	6.63	20	36	–2
Sanseitō	4,260,620	7.44	15	3,924,223	6.95	0	15	+12
Team Mirai	3,813,749	6.66	11	156,853	0.28	0	11	New
Japanese Communist Party	2,519,807	4.40	4	2,283,885	4.05	0	4	–4
Reiwa Shinsengumi	1,672,499	2.92	1	255,496	0.45	0	1	–8
Conservative Party of Japan	1,455,563	2.54	0	97,753	0.17	0	0	–3
Tax Cuts Japan and Yukoku Alliance	814,874	1.42	0	354,617	0.63	1	1	New
Social Democratic Party	728,602	1.27	0	148,666	0.26	0	0	–1
Consideration the Euthanasia System	13,014	0.02	0				0	0
Independent Alliance				16,829	0.03	0	0	New
Nihon Yamato Party				15,213	0.03	0	0	New
Japan Liberal Party				12,885	0.02	0	0	New
The Path to Rebirth				12,492	0.02	0	0	New
First Star				2,686	0.00	0	0	New
World Peace Party				2,424	0.00	0	0	New
Future Progressive Party				2,068	0.00	0	0	New
Nuclear Fusion Party				916	0.00	0	0	New
Party of the Heart				795	0.00	0	0	0
Independents				1,253,346	2.22	4	4	–8
Total	57,259,949	100.00	176	56,446,725	100.00	289	465	0
Valid votes	57,259,949	98.62		54,446,726	97.12			
Invalid/blank votes	799,769	1.38		1,614,994	2.88			
Total votes	58,059,718	100.00		56,061,720	100.00			
Registered voters/turnout	103,211,223	56.25		103,211,224	54.32			
Source: Ministry of Internal Affairs and Communications

== Historical composition ==
=== Before World War II (1890–1942) ===
Shakai Taishūtō / Shakai Minshū-tō and misc. socialist / Rikken Minseitō / Jiyūtō / Kensei Hontō / Kokumintō / Dōshikai / Kenseikai / Seiyūhontō / Others / Independent / Taiseikai / Kenseitō / Kaishintō / Shimpotō / Shōwakai / Teikokutō / Rikken Seiyūkai / Kokumin Kyōkai / Kokumin Dōmei / Tōhōkai / Taisei Yokusankai
Election	Total seats	Composition
1st (1890)	300	130 / 5 / 45 / 79 / 41
2nd (1892)	300	94 / 124 / 44 / 38
3rd (Mar. 1894)	300	120 / 51 / 34 / 60 / 35
4th (Sep. 1894)	300	107 / 48 / 64 / 49 / 32
5th (Mar. 1898)	300	105 / 26 / 37 / 103 / 29
6th (Aug. 1898)	300	9 / 26 / 244 / 21
7th (1902)	376	95 / 41 / 32 / 17 / 191
8th (1903)	376	85 / 44 / 55 / 17 / 175
9th (1904)	379	90 / 82 / 55 / 19 / 133
10th (1908)	379	70 / 58 / 64 / 187
11th (1912)	381	95 / 31 / 46 / 209
12th (1915)	381	27 / 153 / 45 / 48 / 108
13th (1917)	381	35 / 121 / 60 / 165
14th (1920)	464	29 / 110 / 47 / 278
15th (1924)	464	30 / 151 / 111 / 69 / 103
16th (1928)	466	7 / 216 / 7 / 19 / 217
17th (1930)	466	5 / 273 / 9 / 5 / 174
18th (1932)	466	5 / 146 / 2 / 12 / 301
19th (1936)	466	18 / 205 / 34 / 20 / 174 / 15
20th (1937)	466	37 / 179 / 34 / 19 / 175 / 11 / 11
21st (1942)	466	85 / 381

=== After World War II (since 1946) ===
JCP / L-JSP / JSP / R-JSP / Labourers and Farmers Party / Nihon Kyōdōtō / Kokumin Kyōdōtō / Others / Independent / Vacant / Nihon Nōmintō / Kaishintō / Nihon Shinpotō / Minshutō / Nihon Minshutō / Liberal Party–Hatoyama / Nihon Jiyūtō / Minshujiyūtō / Jiyūtō
Election	Total seats	Composition
22nd (1946) (Note: Allied-occupation)	466	6 / 92 / 14 / 38 / 81 / 2 / 94 / 141
23rd (1947)	466	4 / 143 / 31 / 17 / 12 / 2 / 4 / 124 / 131
24th (1949)	466	35 / 48 / 7 / 14 / 17 / 12 / 69 / 264
25th (1952)	466	54 / 57 / 4 / 7 / 19 / 85 / 240
26th (1953)	466	1 / 72 / 66 / 5 / 1 / 11 / 76 / 35 / 199
27th (1955)	467	2 / 89 / 67 / 4 / 2 / 5 / 185 / 112

JCP / JSP / Life / SDP / Minsha-tō / Tomorrow Party of Japan / SDF / Minshutō / Team Mirai / CDPJ / CRA / Shintō Sakigake / NFP / Minshutō / Others / Independent / Genzei Nippon / DPFP / Jiyū-tō / Nihon Shintō / Kōmeitō / Komeito / JRP / Minna no Tō / Ishin no Tō / Shin-jiyū-kurabu / PNP / NCP / Ishin / Kibō no Tō / LDP / Nippon Ishin no Kai / Sanseitō / Conservative Party of Japan
Election	Total seats	Composition
28th (1958)	467	1 / 166 / 1 / 12 / 287
29th (1960)	467	3 / 145 / 17 / 1 / 5 / 296
30th (1963)	467	5 / 144 / 23 / 12 / 283
31st (1967)	486	5 / 140 / 30 / 9 / 25 / 277
32nd (1969)	486	14 / 90 / 31 / 16 / 47 / 288
33rd (1972)	491	38 / 118 / 19 / 2 / 14 / 29 / 271
34th (1976)	511	17 / 123 / 29 / 21 / 55 / 17 / 249
35th (1979)	511	39 / 107 / 35 / 2 / 19 / 57 / 4 / 248
36th (1980)	511	29 / 107 / 32 / 3 / 11 / 33 / 12 / 284
37th (1983)	511	26 / 112 / 38 / 3 / 16 / 58 / 8 / 250
38th (1986)	512	26 / 85 / 26 / 4 / 9 / 56 / 6 / 300
39th (1990)	512	16 / 136 / 14 / 4 / 1 / 21 / 45 / 275
40th (1993)	511	15 / 70 / 15 / 4 / 13 / 30 / 35 / 51 / 55 / 223
41st (1996)	500	26 / 15 / 2 / 156 / 52 / 1 / 9 / 239
42nd (2000)	480	20 / 19 / 127 / 6 / 15 / 22 / 31 / 7 / 233
43rd (2003)	480	9 / 6 / 177 / 2 / 11 / 34 / 4 / 237
44th (2005)	480	9 / 7 / 113 / 2 / 18 / 31 / 4 / 239
45th (2009)	480	9 / 7 / 308 / 2 / 6 / 21 / 5 / 3 / 119
46th (2012)	480	8 / 2 / 9 / 57 / 1 / 5 / 31 / 18 / 1 / 54 / 294
47th (2014)	475	21 / 2 / 73 / 4 / 8 / 35 / 41 / 291
48th (2017)	465	12 / 2 / 55 / 22 / 29 / 11 / 50 / 284
49th (2021)	465	10 / 3 / 1 / 96 / 10 / 11 / 32 / 41 / 261
50th (2024)	465	8 / 9 / 1 / 148 / 12 / 28 / 24 / 38 / 3 / 3 / 191
51st (2026)	465	4 / 1 / 11 / 49 / 4 / 1 / 28 / 36 / 15 / 316

== Election results for major parties since 1958 ==
Shaded

- green: Ruling party/coalition before and after the lower house election
- red: Ruling party/coalition until the election = Change of government as a result of the lower house election
- blue: Ruling party/coalition after the election = Change of government as a result of the lower house election
- none: Opposition before and after the election

Note that the composition of the ruling coalition may change between lower house elections, e.g. after upper house elections. Parties who vote with the government in the Diet, but are not part of the cabinet (e.g. SDP & NPH after the 1996 election) are not shaded.

=== Parallel electoral system (since 1996) ===
Vote and seats by party and segment
Parties	Segment	1996	2000	2003	2005	2009	2012	2014	2017
Total seats		500	480	480	480	480	480	475	465
Liberal Democratic Party (LDP) Jiyū Minshutō	FPTP	38.6%	41.0%	43.9%	47.8%	38.6%	43.0%	48.1%	48.21%
Liberal Democratic Party (LDP) Jiyū Minshutō	FPTP	169	177	168	219	64	237	223	226
Liberal Democratic Party (LDP) Jiyū Minshutō	PR	32.8%	28.3%	35.0%	38.1%	26.7%	27.6%	33.1%	33.28%
Liberal Democratic Party (LDP) Jiyū Minshutō	PR	70	56	69	77	55	57	68	66
Liberal Democratic Party (LDP) Jiyū Minshutō	Total seats	239	233	237	296	119	294	291	284
Constitutional Democratic Party (CDP) Rikken Minshutō	FPTP	–							8.75%
Constitutional Democratic Party (CDP) Rikken Minshutō	FPTP	–							18
Constitutional Democratic Party (CDP) Rikken Minshutō	PR	–							19.88%
Constitutional Democratic Party (CDP) Rikken Minshutō	PR	–							37
Constitutional Democratic Party (CDP) Rikken Minshutō	Total seats	–							55
Party of Hope Kibō no Tō	FPTP	–							20.64%
Party of Hope Kibō no Tō	FPTP	–							18
Party of Hope Kibō no Tō	PR	–							17.36%
Party of Hope Kibō no Tō	PR	–							32
Party of Hope Kibō no Tō	Total seats	–							50
Democratic Party of Japan (DPJ) Minshutō (1996–2014); Democratic Party (DP) Minshintō (2017)	FPTP	10.6%	27.6%	36.7%	36.4%	47.4%	22.8%	22.5%	no party nominations, ≈14 members elected
Democratic Party of Japan (DPJ) Minshutō (1996–2014); Democratic Party (DP) Minshintō (2017)	FPTP	17	80	105	52	221	27	38	no party nominations, ≈14 members elected
Democratic Party of Japan (DPJ) Minshutō (1996–2014); Democratic Party (DP) Minshintō (2017)	PR	16.1%	25.2%	37.4%	31.0%	42.4%	15.9%	18.3%	no party nominations, ≈14 members elected
Democratic Party of Japan (DPJ) Minshutō (1996–2014); Democratic Party (DP) Minshintō (2017)	PR	35	47	72	61	87	30	35	no party nominations, ≈14 members elected
Democratic Party of Japan (DPJ) Minshutō (1996–2014); Democratic Party (DP) Minshintō (2017)	Total seats	52	127	177	113	308	57	73	no party nominations, ≈14 members elected
Japan Restoration Party (JRP) Nippon Ishin no Kai (2012); Japan Innovation Party (JIP) Ishin no Tō (2014)	FPTP	–					11.6%	8.2%	3.18%
Japan Restoration Party (JRP) Nippon Ishin no Kai (2012); Japan Innovation Party (JIP) Ishin no Tō (2014)	FPTP	–					14	11	3
Japan Restoration Party (JRP) Nippon Ishin no Kai (2012); Japan Innovation Party (JIP) Ishin no Tō (2014)	PR	–					20.3%	15.7%	6.07%
Japan Restoration Party (JRP) Nippon Ishin no Kai (2012); Japan Innovation Party (JIP) Ishin no Tō (2014)	PR	–					40	30	8
Japan Restoration Party (JRP) Nippon Ishin no Kai (2012); Japan Innovation Party (JIP) Ishin no Tō (2014)	Total seats	–					54	41	11
(New) Komeito (K/NK/NKP/CGP/NCGP/etc.) Kōmeitō	FPTP	–	2.0%	1.5%	1.4%	1.1%	1.4%	1.5%	1.5%
(New) Komeito (K/NK/NKP/CGP/NCGP/etc.) Kōmeitō	FPTP	–	7	9	8	0	9	9	8
(New) Komeito (K/NK/NKP/CGP/NCGP/etc.) Kōmeitō	PR	–	13.0%	14.8%	13.3%	11.4%	11.8%	13.7%	12.51%
(New) Komeito (K/NK/NKP/CGP/NCGP/etc.) Kōmeitō	PR	–	24	25	23	21	22	26	21
(New) Komeito (K/NK/NKP/CGP/NCGP/etc.) Kōmeitō	Total seats	–	31	34	31	21	31	35	29
Japanese Communist Party (JCP) Nihon Kyōsantō	FPTP	12.6%	12.1%	8.1%	7.2%	4.2%	7.8%	13.3%	9.02%
Japanese Communist Party (JCP) Nihon Kyōsantō	FPTP	2	0	0	0	0	0	1	1
Japanese Communist Party (JCP) Nihon Kyōsantō	PR	13.1%	11.2%	7.8%	7.2%	7.0%	6.1%	11.4%	7.9%
Japanese Communist Party (JCP) Nihon Kyōsantō	PR	24	20	9	9	9	8	20	11
Japanese Communist Party (JCP) Nihon Kyōsantō	Total seats	26	20	9	9	9	8	21	12
Social Democratic Party (SDP) Shakai Minshutō	FPTP	2.2%	3.8%	2.9%	1.5%	1.9%	0.7%	0.8%	1.15%
Social Democratic Party (SDP) Shakai Minshutō	FPTP	4	4	1	1	3	1	1	1
Social Democratic Party (SDP) Shakai Minshutō	PR	6.4%	9.4%	5.1%	5.5%	4.2%	2.3%	2.5%	1.69%
Social Democratic Party (SDP) Shakai Minshutō	PR	11	15	5	6	4	1	1	1
Social Democratic Party (SDP) Shakai Minshutō	Total seats	15	19	6	7	7	2	2	2
New Frontier Party (NFP) Shinshintō (1996); Liberal Party Jiyūtō (2000); Tomorrow Party of Japan (TPJ) Nippon Mirai no Tō (2012); People's Life Party (PLP) Seikatsu no Tō (2014); Liberal Party (LP) Jiyūtō (2017)	FPTP	28.0%	3.4%	–			5.0%	1.0%	no party nominations, 2 members elected
New Frontier Party (NFP) Shinshintō (1996); Liberal Party Jiyūtō (2000); Tomorrow Party of Japan (TPJ) Nippon Mirai no Tō (2012); People's Life Party (PLP) Seikatsu no Tō (2014); Liberal Party (LP) Jiyūtō (2017)	FPTP	96	4	–			2	2	no party nominations, 2 members elected
New Frontier Party (NFP) Shinshintō (1996); Liberal Party Jiyūtō (2000); Tomorrow Party of Japan (TPJ) Nippon Mirai no Tō (2012); People's Life Party (PLP) Seikatsu no Tō (2014); Liberal Party (LP) Jiyūtō (2017)	PR	28.0%	11.0%	–			5.7%	1.9%	no party nominations, 2 members elected
New Frontier Party (NFP) Shinshintō (1996); Liberal Party Jiyūtō (2000); Tomorrow Party of Japan (TPJ) Nippon Mirai no Tō (2012); People's Life Party (PLP) Seikatsu no Tō (2014); Liberal Party (LP) Jiyūtō (2017)	PR	60	18	–			7	0	no party nominations, 2 members elected
New Frontier Party (NFP) Shinshintō (1996); Liberal Party Jiyūtō (2000); Tomorrow Party of Japan (TPJ) Nippon Mirai no Tō (2012); People's Life Party (PLP) Seikatsu no Tō (2014); Liberal Party (LP) Jiyūtō (2017)	Total seats	156	22	–			9	2	no party nominations, 2 members elected
Your Party (YP) Minna no Tō	FPTP	–				0.8%	4.7%	–	
Your Party (YP) Minna no Tō	FPTP	–				2	4	–	
Your Party (YP) Minna no Tō	PR	–				4.2%	8.7%	–	
Your Party (YP) Minna no Tō	PR	–				3	14	–	
Your Party (YP) Minna no Tō	Total seats	–				5	19	–	
Conservative Party Hoshutō (2000); New Conservative Party Hoshu Shintō (2003)	FPTP	–	2.0%	1.3%	–				
Conservative Party Hoshutō (2000); New Conservative Party Hoshu Shintō (2003)	FPTP	–	7	4	–				
Conservative Party Hoshutō (2000); New Conservative Party Hoshu Shintō (2003)	PR	–	0.4%	–	–				
Conservative Party Hoshutō (2000); New Conservative Party Hoshu Shintō (2003)	PR	–	0	–	–				
Conservative Party Hoshutō (2000); New Conservative Party Hoshu Shintō (2003)	Total seats	–	7	4	–				
New Party Harbinger (NPH) Shintō Sakigake	FPTP	1.3%	–						
New Party Harbinger (NPH) Shintō Sakigake	FPTP	2	–						
New Party Harbinger (NPH) Shintō Sakigake	PR	1.0%	–						
New Party Harbinger (NPH) Shintō Sakigake	PR	0	–						
New Party Harbinger (NPH) Shintō Sakigake	Total seats	2	–						

=== SNTV multi-member districts (1947–1993) ===
Vote for candidates by party and seats by party
Parties	1958	1960	1963	1967	1969	1972	1976	1979	1980	1983	1986	1990	1993
Total seats	467	467	467	486	486	491	511	511	511	511	512	512	511
Liberal Democratic Party (LDP) Jiyū Minshutō	57.8%	57.6%	54.7%	48.8%	47.6%	46.8%	41.8%	44.6%	47.9%	48.9%	49.4%	46.1%	36.7%
Liberal Democratic Party (LDP) Jiyū Minshutō	287	296	283	277	288	271	249	248	284	250	300	275	223
Japan Socialist Party (JSP) Nippon Shakaitō	32.9%	27.6%	29.0%	27.9%	21.4%	21.9%	20.7%	19.7%	19.3%	19.5%	17.2%	24.4%	15.4%
Japan Socialist Party (JSP) Nippon Shakaitō	166	145	144	140	90	118	123	107	107	112	85	136	70
Japan Renewal Party (JRP) Shinseitō	–												10.1%
Japan Renewal Party (JRP) Shinseitō	–												55
Kōmeitō (K/KP/CGP/etc.) Kōmeitō	–			5.4%	10.9%	8.5%	11.0%	9.8%	9.0%	10.1%	9.4%	8.0%	8.1%
Kōmeitō (K/KP/CGP/etc.) Kōmeitō	–			25	47	29	55	57	33	58	56	45	51
Japan New Party (JNP) Nihon Shintō	–												8.0%
Japan New Party (JNP) Nihon Shintō	–												35
Democratic Socialist Party (DSP) Minshatō	–	8.8%	7.4%	7.4%	7.7%	7.0%	6.3%	6.8%	6.6%	7.3%	6.4%	4.8%	3.5%
Democratic Socialist Party (DSP) Minshatō	–	17	23	30	31	19	29	35	32	38	26	14	15
Japanese Communist Party (JCP) Nihon Kyōsantō	2.6%	2.9%	4.0%	4.8%	6.8%	10.5%	10.4%	10.4%	9.8%	9.3%	8.8%	8.0%	7.7%
Japanese Communist Party (JCP) Nihon Kyōsantō	1	3	5	5	14	38	17	39	29	26	26	16	15
New Party Harbinger (NPH) Shintō Sakigake	–												3.5%
New Party Harbinger (NPH) Shintō Sakigake	–												13

== History ==
=== Meiji period (1890–1912) ===
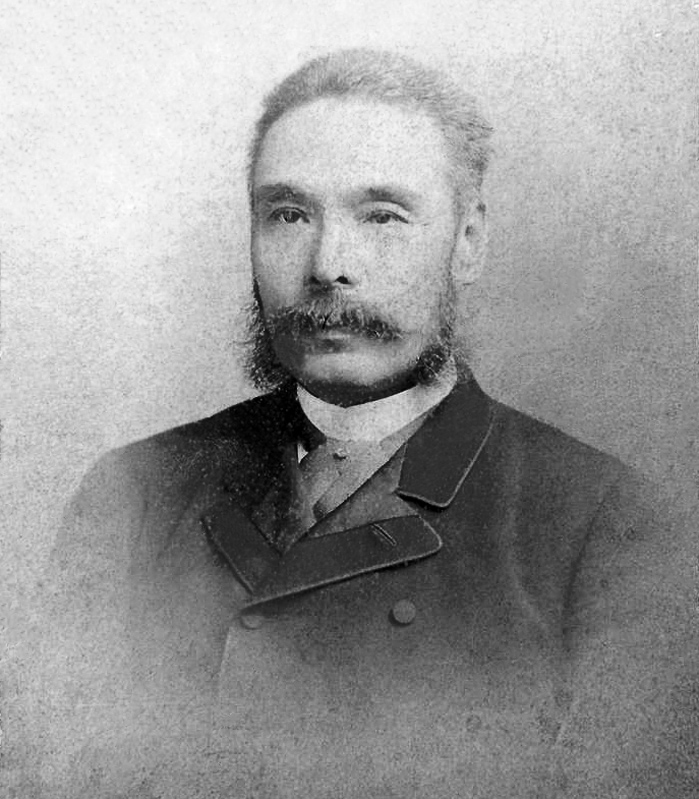
Kuroda Kiyotaka, Satsuma samurai and prime minister in the late 1880s, coined the term "transcendentalism" (超然主義, chōzen shugi) on the occasion of the promulgation of the Meiji Constitution in 1889. The oligarchs should try to "transcend" electoral politics and govern without partisan majorities the House of Representatives.

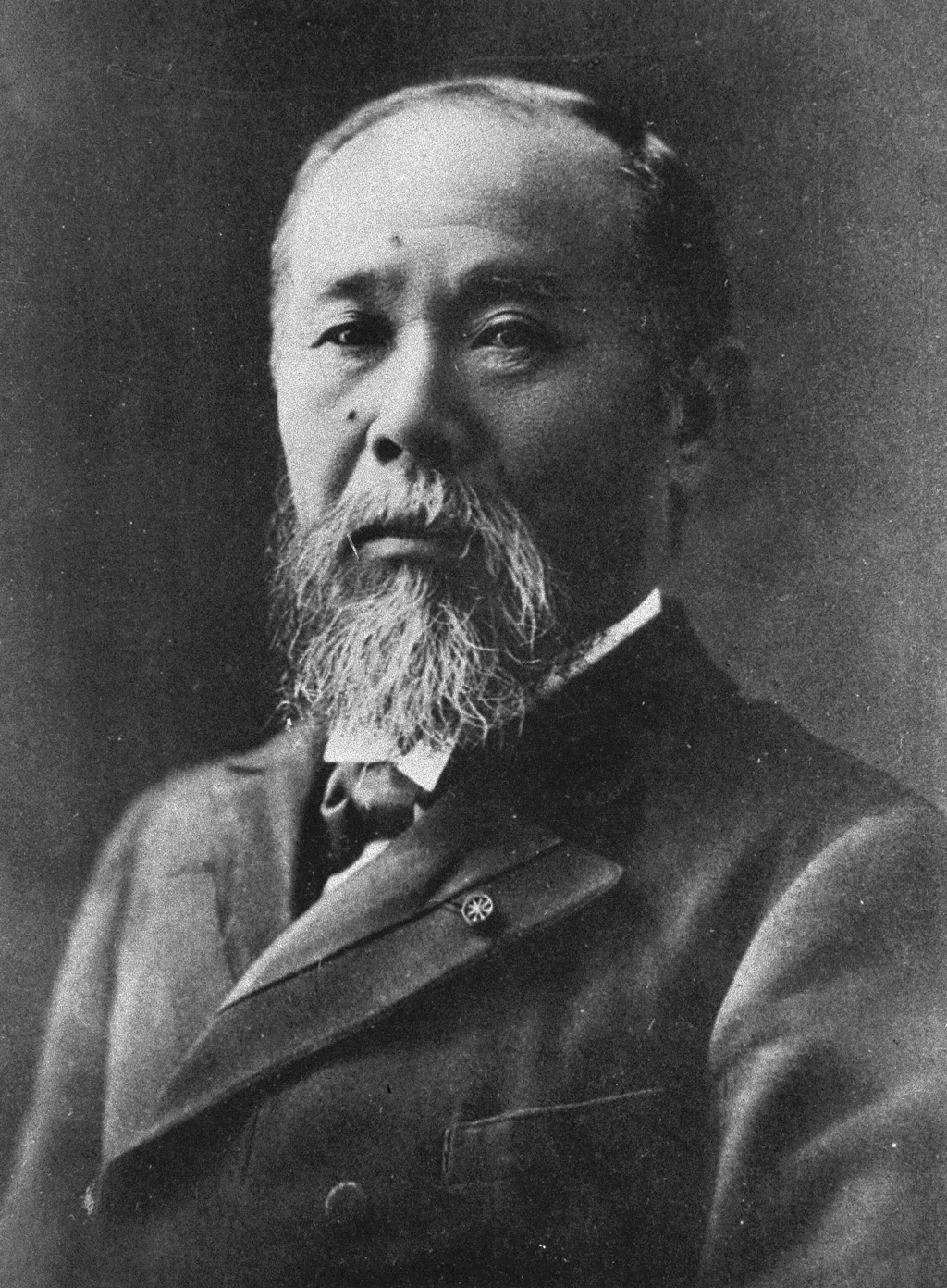
Itō Hirobumi, a Chōshū samurai, member of the House of Peers and prime minister of Japan on three non-consecutive occasions between 1885 and 1901. He was a main architect of the Imperial Constitution which created the Imperial Diet. When the oligarchs attempts to govern "transcendentally" mostly failed in the 1890s, he saw the necessity for permanent allies among elected political parties.

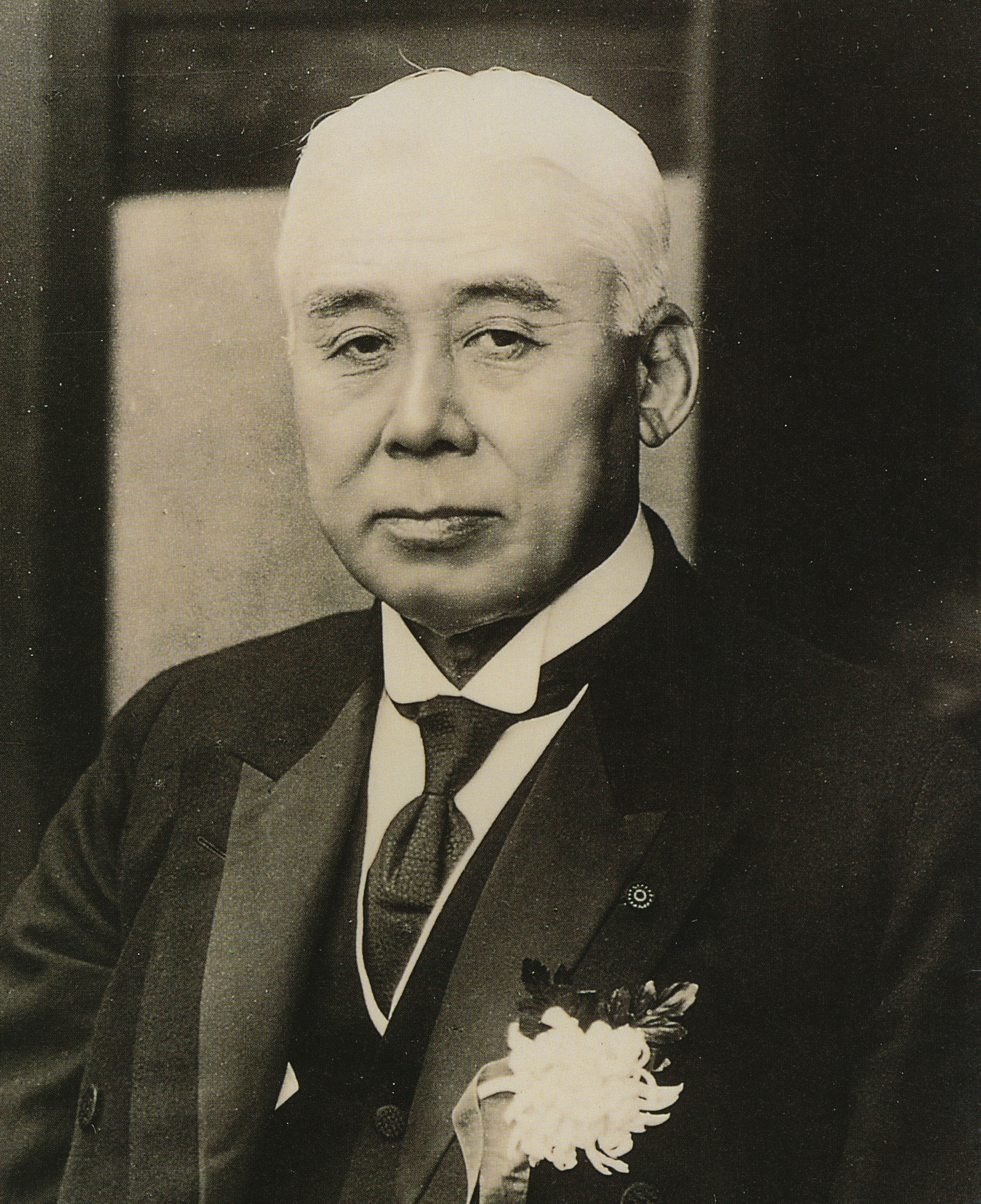
Hara Takashi, although born a Morioka noble, made his career as commoner-politician and became the first and one of only three prime ministers from the House of Representatives in the Empire.

The Japanese parliament, then known as the Imperial Diet, was established in 1890 as a result of the 1889 Meiji Constitution. It was modeled on the parliaments of several Western countries, particularly the German Empire and the United Kingdom, because of the Emperor Meiji's westernizing reforms. The Imperial Diet consisted of two chambers, the elected House of Representatives which was the lower house, and the House of Peers which was the upper house. This format was similar to the House of Lords in the Westminster system, or the Herrenhaus in Prussia, where the upper house represented the aristocracy.

Both houses, and also the Emperor, had to agree on legislation, and even at the height of party-based constitutional government, the House of Peers could simply vote down bills deemed too liberal by the Meiji oligarchy, such as the introduction of women's suffrage, increases in local autonomy, or trade union rights. The prime minister and his government served at the Emperor's pleasure, and could not be removed by the Imperial Diet. However, the right to vote on, and if necessary to block, legislation including the budget, gave the House of Representatives leverage to force the government into negotiations. After an early period of frequent confrontation and temporary alliances between the cabinet and political parties in the lower house, parts of the Meiji oligarchy more sympathetic to political parties around Itō Hirobumi and parts of the liberal parties eventually formed a more permanent alliance, in the form of the Rikken Seiyūkai in 1900. The confidence of the House of Representatives was never a formal requirement to govern, but between 1905 and 1918, only one cabinet took office that did not enjoy majority support in the House of Representatives.

=== Taisho and early Showa periods (1912–1937) ===
During the Taishō political crisis in 1913, a no-confidence vote against the third Katsura government, accompanied by major demonstrations outside the Diet, was followed shortly by resignation. Subsequently, in the period often referred to as Taishō democracy, it became increasingly customary to appoint many ministers, including several prime ministers, from the House of Representatives – Hara Takashi was the first commoner to become prime minister in 1918.

In the same year, the Rice Riots had confronted the government with an unprecedented scale of domestic unrest, and a German Revolution brought the Prusso-German monarchy to an end, the very system Meiji oligarchs had used as the main model for the Meiji constitution to consolidate and preserve Imperial power. Even Yamagata Aritomo and other oligarchs that had been fundamentally opposed to political parties, became more inclined to cooperate with the still mainly bourgeoisie parties, to prevent a rise of socialism or other movements that might threaten Imperial rule. Socialist parties would not be represented in significant numbers in the lower house until the 1930s.

The initially very high census suffrage requirement was reduced several times, until the introduction of universal male suffrage in 1925. The electoral system to the House of Representatives was also fundamentally changed several times: between systems of "small" mostly single- and few multi-member electoral districts (1890s, 1920, 1924), "medium" mostly multi-member districts (1928–1942) and "large" electoral districts (usually only one, rarely two city and one counties district per prefecture; 1900s and 1910s), using first-past-the-post in single-member districts, plurality-at-large voting (1890s) or single non-transferable vote in the multi-member districts.

Influence of the House of Representatives on the government increased, and the party cabinets of the 1920s brought Japan apparently closer to a parliamentary system of government, and there were several reforms to the upper house in 1925. However, the balance of powers between the two houses and the influential role of extra-constitutional actors such as the Genrō (who still selected the prime minister) or the military (that had brought down several cabinets) remained in essence untouched. Within a year of the Japanese invasion of Manchuria in September 1931, a series of assassinations and coup attempts followed. Party governments were replaced by governments of "national unity" (kyokoku itchi) which were dominated by nobles, bureaucrats and increasingly the military.

=== World War II and aftermath (1937–1947) ===
After the Marco Polo Bridge Incident and the start of war in 1937, the influence of the Imperial Diet was further diminished, though never eliminated, by special laws such as the National Mobilization Law and expanded powers for cabinet agencies such as the Planning Board. The House of Representatives in the Empire had a four-year term and could be dissolved by the Emperor. In contrast, members of the House of Peers had either life tenure (subject to revocation by the Emperor) or a seven-year term in the case of members elected in mutual peerage elections among the three lower peerage ranks, top taxpayer and academic peerage elections. During the war, the term of the members of the House of Representatives elected in the last pre-war election of 1937 was extended by one year.

In the 1946 election to the House of Representatives, held under the U.S.-led Allied occupation of Japan, women's suffrage was introduced, and a system of "large" electoral districts (one or two per prefecture) with limited voting was used. A change in the electoral law in April 1945 had for the first time allocated 30 seats to the established colonies of the Empire: Karafuto (Sakhalin), Taiwan, and Chōsen (Korea); but this change was never implemented. Similarly, Korea and Taiwan were granted several appointed members of the House of Peers in 1945.

In 1946, both houses of the Imperial Diet (together with the Emperor) passed the postwar constitutional amendment which took effect in 1947. The Imperial Diet was renamed the National Diet, the House of Peers was replaced by an elected upper house called the House of Councillors (renamed to 'Senate' in 2026), and the House of Representatives would now be able to override the upper house in important matters. The constitution also gave the Diet exclusive legislative authority, without involvement of the Emperor, and explicitly made the cabinet responsible to the Diet and requires that the prime minister has the support of a majority in the House of Representatives.

=== Late Showa period (1947–1989) ===
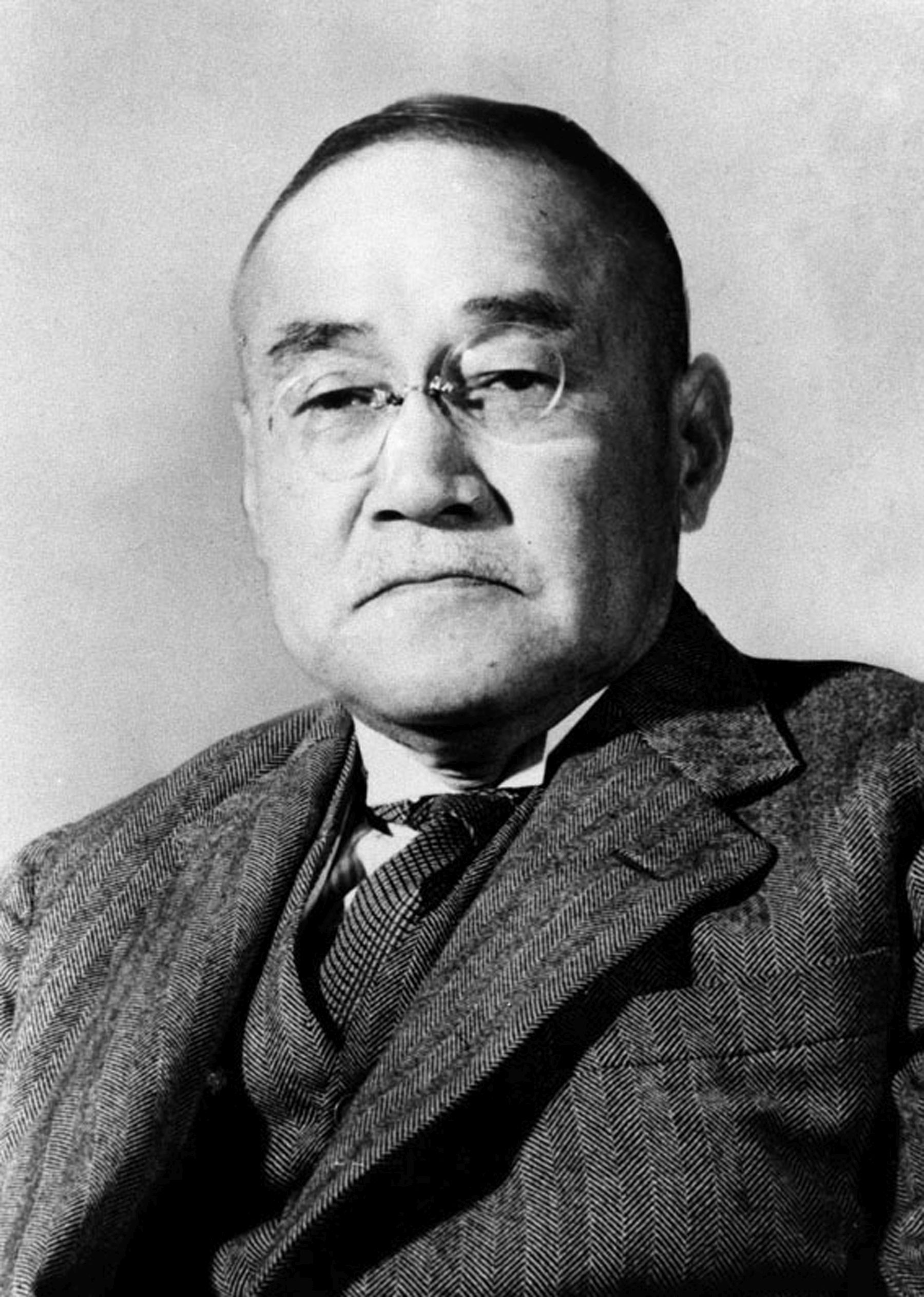
Shigeru Yoshida, prime minister 1946–1947 as a member of the House of Peers and 1948–1954 as a member of the House of Representatives, oversaw the end of the American-led occupation and the beginning of the Japanese economic miracle.

The Diet first met under the new constitution on May 20, 1947. Four days later, Tetsu Katayama of the Democratic Socialist Party became Japan's first socialist prime minister and the first since the introduction of parliamentarianism.

Since the end of US rule in 1952, it has been the norm that the prime minister dissolves the House of Representatives before its 4-year term expires. Only once, in 1976, did the House last a full 4 years. It has become tradition to give nicknames to each dissolution, usually referencing a major political issue or controversy. One infamous example was on March 14, 1953, when Shigeru Yoshida dissolved the House and called for new election, after he name called people during a meeting of the budget committee. This came to be known as the "you idiot" dissolution.

In 1955, prime minister Ichirō Hatoyama oversaw the creation of the Liberal Democratic Party (LDP), which since his third government has dominated Japanese politics under the 1955 System. The LDP would govern without interruption for nearly 40 years until the 1993 election, alone save for a three-year coalition government with the New Liberal Club after the 1983 election.

Hatoyama planned to change the electoral system to first past the post, introducing a bill to that effect in March 1956. This was met with opposition from the Socialist Party, who criticized Hatoyama's plan as a "Hatomander". The bill passed the House of Representatives in May 1956, but was never voted on by the House of Councillors. Electoral reform came into vogue again in the 1970s, but Kakuei Tanaka's plan met opposition internally in the LDP and never came to a vote in either chamber of the Diet.

=== Heisei and Reiwa periods (since 1989) ===
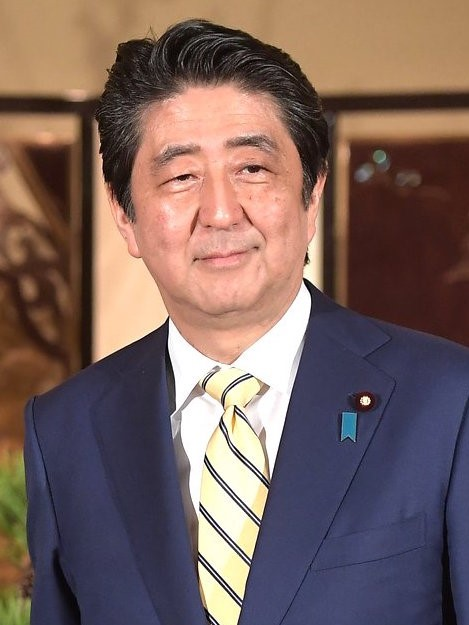
Shinzo Abe, prime minister 2006–2007 and again 2012–2020, was the longest-serving PM in Japanese history.

Japan entered a lengthy recession in the 1990s (see Lost Decades), which many people blamed on the LDP. In the 1993 election, the party lost power for the first time under the 1955 System, when an eight-party coalition led by Morihiro Hosokawa of the Japan New Party were able to form a government. This government fell apart after nine months, and was succeeded by the Hata Cabinet, another short-lived non-LDP government. The LDP returned to power in 1994 with the Murayama Cabinet, this time in a coalition with their old rivals the Socialists, whose leader Tomiichi Murayama became prime minister.

As with party colleagues Ichirō Hatoyama and Kakuei Tanaka before him, prime minister Toshiki Kaifu of the LDP unsuccessfully tried to reform the electoral system in 1991. However, the Morihiro Hosokawa government got the 1994 Japanese electoral reform through the Diet, introducing a parallel voting system which went into effect at the next election in 1996. Under this system, which remains in effect as of 2022, 300 (since reduced to 289) members of the House of Representatives are elected using first past the post in single-member constituencies, while 200 (since reduced to 176) members are elected in regional blocs using party-list proportional representation.

Prime minister Junichiro Koizumi introduced a bill to the House of Representatives in 2006 on changing the Imperial Household Law to allow a woman to ascend the Chrysanthemum Throne (see Japanese imperial succession debate), but he withdrew the bill after the birth of Prince Hisahito of Akishino the same year. The LDP once again lost power at the 2009 election, when the Democratic Party-led Hatoyama Cabinet took over, followed in rapid succession by the Kan Cabinet and Noda Cabinet. The LDP and Komeito, who had formed a two-party government between 2003 and 2009, came to power again after the 2012 election. Shinzo Abe, who had previously led the First Abe Cabinet, was prime minister for another stint lasting eight years, stepping down for health reasons in 2020. He was succeeded by Yoshihide Suga.

When the Emperor Akihito expressed interest in abdicating, the Diet passed the Emperor Abdication Law in 2017, allowing for the 2019 Japanese imperial transition and the succession to the throne of Naruhito. In December 2022, in light of the Russian invasion of Ukraine and increased military cooperation between China and Russia, prime minister Fumio Kishida announced plans to significantly increase funding for the Japan Self-Defense Forces; this was continued under his successor as prime minister, Shigeru Ishiba.

== List of House of Representatives general elections ==
=== 19th century ===
Election	Date	Prime Minister appointed by Emperor (during term)	Turnout	Seats	Date of dissolution (D) / expiration of term (E)	Registered voters	Largest party / Seats Share			Emperor
Imperial Diet (1890–1947); upper house: House of Peers										Meiji (era)
1st	1 July 1890	Yamagata Aritomo	93.91%	300		450,872	Constitutional Liberal	130	43.33%	Meiji (era)
1st	1 July 1890	(Matsukata Masayoshi)	93.91%	300		450,872	Constitutional Liberal	130	43.33%	Meiji (era)
2nd	15 February 1892	Matsukata Masayoshi	91.59%	300	(D) December 25, 1891	434,594	Constitutional Liberal	94	31.33%	Meiji (era)
2nd	15 February 1892	(Itō Hirobumi)	91.59%	300	(D) December 25, 1891	434,594	Constitutional Liberal	94	31.33%	Meiji (era)
3rd	March 1, 1894	Itō Hirobumi	88.76%	300	(D) December 30, 1893	440,113	Constitutional Liberal	120	40.00%	Meiji (era)
4th	1 September 1894	Itō Hirobumi	84.84%	300	(D) June 2, 1894	460,483	Constitutional Liberal	107	35.66%	Meiji (era)
4th	1 September 1894	(Matsukata Masayoshi)	84.84%	300	(D) June 2, 1894	460,483	Constitutional Liberal	107	35.66%	Meiji (era)
4th	1 September 1894	(Itō Hirobumi)	84.84%	300	(D) June 2, 1894	460,483	Constitutional Liberal	107	35.66%	Meiji (era)
5th	15 March 1898	Itō Hirobumi	87.50%	300	(D) December 25, 1897	452,637	Constitutional Liberal	105	35.00%	Meiji (era)
5th	15 March 1898	(Ōkuma Shigenobu)	87.50%	300	(D) December 25, 1897	452,637	Constitutional Liberal	105	35.00%	Meiji (era)
6th	10 August 1898	Ōkuma Shigenobu	79.91%	300	(D) June 10, 1898	502,292	Kensei Hontō	124	41.33%	Meiji (era)
6th	10 August 1898	(Yamagata Aritomo)	79.91%	300	(D) June 10, 1898	502,292	Kensei Hontō	124	41.33%	Meiji (era)
6th	10 August 1898	(Itō Hirobumi)	79.91%	300	(D) June 10, 1898	502,292	Kensei Hontō	124	41.33%	Meiji (era)
6th	10 August 1898	(Katsura Tarō)	79.91%	300	(D) June 10, 1898	502,292	Kensei Hontō	124	41.33%	Meiji (era)

=== 20th century ===
Election	Date	Prime Minister appointed by Emperor (during term)	Turnout	Seats	Date of dissolution (D) / expiration of term (E)	Registered voters	Largest party / Seats Share			Emperor
7th	August 10, 1902	Katsura Tarō	88.39%	376	(E) August 9, 1902	982,868	Rikken Seiyūkai	191	50.79%	Meiji (era)
8th	March 1, 1903	Katsura Tarō	86.17%	376	(D) December 28, 1902	958,322	Rikken Seiyūkai	175	46.54%	Meiji (era)
9th	1 March 1904	Katsura Tarō	86.06%	379	(D) December 11, 1903	762,445	Rikken Seiyūkai	133	35.09%	Meiji (era)
9th	1 March 1904	(Saionji Kinmochi)	86.06%	379	(D) December 11, 1903	762,445	Rikken Seiyūkai	133	35.09%	Meiji (era)
10th	15 May 1908	Saionji Kinmochi	85.29%	379	(E) March 27, 1908	1,590,045	Rikken Seiyūkai	187	49.34%	Meiji (era)
10th	15 May 1908	(Katsura Tarō)	85.29%	379	(E) March 27, 1908	1,590,045	Rikken Seiyūkai	187	49.34%	Meiji (era)
10th	15 May 1908	(Saionji Kinmochi)	85.29%	379	(E) March 27, 1908	1,590,045	Rikken Seiyūkai	187	49.34%	Meiji (era)
11th	15 May 1912	Saionji Kinmochi	89.58%	381	(E) May 14, 1912	1,506,143	Rikken Seiyūkai	209	54.85%	Meiji (era)
11th	15 May 1912	(Katsura Tarō)	89.58%	381	(E) May 14, 1912	1,506,143	Rikken Seiyūkai	209	54.85%	Taishō (era)
11th	15 May 1912	(Yamamoto Gonnohyōe)	89.58%	381	(E) May 14, 1912	1,506,143	Rikken Seiyūkai	209	54.85%	Taishō (era)
11th	15 May 1912	(Ōkuma Shigenobu)	89.58%	381	(E) May 14, 1912	1,506,143	Rikken Seiyūkai	209	54.85%	Taishō (era)
12th	25 March 1915	Ōkuma Shigenobu	92.13%	381	(D) December 25, 1914	1,546,411	Rikken Dōshikai	153	40.15%	Taishō (era)
12th	25 March 1915	(Terauchi Masatake)	92.13%	381	(D) December 25, 1914	1,546,411	Rikken Dōshikai	153	40.15%	Taishō (era)
13th	20 April 1917	Terauchi Masatake	91.92%	381	(D) January 25, 1917	1,422,126	Rikken Seiyūkai	165	43.30%	Taishō (era)
13th	20 April 1917	(Hara Takashi)	91.92%	381	(D) January 25, 1917	1,422,126	Rikken Seiyūkai	165	43.30%	Taishō (era)
14th	10 May 1920	Hara Takashi	86.73%	464	(D) February 26, 1920	3,069,148	Rikken Seiyūkai	278	59.91%	Taishō (era)
14th	10 May 1920	(Takahashi Korekiyo)	86.73%	464	(D) February 26, 1920	3,069,148	Rikken Seiyūkai	278	59.91%	Taishō (era)
14th	10 May 1920	(Katō Tomosaburō)	86.73%	464	(D) February 26, 1920	3,069,148	Rikken Seiyūkai	278	59.91%	Taishō (era)
14th	10 May 1920	(Yamamoto Gonnohyōe)	86.73%	464	(D) February 26, 1920	3,069,148	Rikken Seiyūkai	278	59.91%	Taishō (era)
14th	10 May 1920	(Kiyoura Keigo)	86.73%	464	(D) February 26, 1920	3,069,148	Rikken Seiyūkai	278	59.91%	Taishō (era)
15th	10 May 1924	Katō Takaaki	91.18%	464	(D) January 31, 1924	3,288,405	Kenseikai	151	32.54%	Taishō (era)
15th	10 May 1924	(Wakatsuki Reijirō)	91.18%	464	(D) January 31, 1924	3,288,405	Kenseikai	151	32.54%	Taishō (era)
15th	10 May 1924	(Tanaka Giichi)	91.18%	464	(D) January 31, 1924	3,288,405	Kenseikai	151	32.54%	Shōwa (era)
16th	20 February 1928	Tanaka Giichi	80.36%	466	(D) January 21, 1928	12,408,678	Rikken Seiyūkai	218	46.78%	Shōwa (era)
16th	20 February 1928	(Hamaguchi Osachi)	80.36%	466	(D) January 21, 1928	12,408,678	Rikken Seiyūkai	218	46.78%	Shōwa (era)
17th	20 February 1930	Hamaguchi Osachi	83.34%	466	(D) January 21, 1930	12,812,895	Rikken Minseitō	273	58.58%	Shōwa (era)
17th	20 February 1930	(Wakatsuki Reijirō)	83.34%	466	(D) January 21, 1930	12,812,895	Rikken Minseitō	273	58.58%	Shōwa (era)
17th	20 February 1930	(Inukai Tsuyoshi)	83.34%	466	(D) January 21, 1930	12,812,895	Rikken Minseitō	273	58.58%	Shōwa (era)
18th	20 February 1932	Inukai Tsuyoshi	81.68%	466	(D) January 21, 1932	13,237,841	Rikken Seiyukai	301	64.59%	Shōwa (era)
18th	20 February 1932	(Saitō Makoto)	81.68%	466	(D) January 21, 1932	13,237,841	Rikken Seiyukai	301	64.59%	Shōwa (era)
18th	20 February 1932	(Keisuke Okada)	81.68%	466	(D) January 21, 1932	13,237,841	Rikken Seiyukai	301	64.59%	Shōwa (era)
19th	20 February 1936	Kōki Hirota	78.65%	466	(D) January 21, 1936	14,479,553	Rikken Minseitō	205	43.99%	Shōwa (era)
19th	20 February 1936	(Senjūrō Hayashi)	78.65%	466	(D) January 21, 1936	14,479,553	Rikken Minseitō	205	43.99%	Shōwa (era)
20th	30 April 1937	Senjūrō Hayashi	73.31%	466	(D) March 31, 1937	14,618,298	Rikken Minseitō	179	38.41%	Shōwa (era)
20th	30 April 1937	(Fumimaro Konoe)	73.31%	466	(D) March 31, 1937	14,618,298	Rikken Minseitō	179	38.41%	Shōwa (era)
20th	30 April 1937	(Hiranuma Kiichirō)	73.31%	466	(D) March 31, 1937	14,618,298	Rikken Minseitō	179	38.41%	Shōwa (era)
20th	30 April 1937	(Nobuyuki Abe)	73.31%	466	(D) March 31, 1937	14,618,298	Rikken Minseitō	179	38.41%	Shōwa (era)
20th	30 April 1937	(Mitsumasa Yonai)	73.31%	466	(D) March 31, 1937	14,618,298	Rikken Minseitō	179	38.41%	Shōwa (era)
20th	30 April 1937	(Fumimaro Konoe)	73.31%	466	(D) March 31, 1937	14,618,298	Rikken Minseitō	179	38.41%	Shōwa (era)
20th	30 April 1937	(Fumimaro Konoe)	73.31%	466	(D) March 31, 1937	14,618,298	Rikken Minseitō	179	38.41%	Shōwa (era)
20th	30 April 1937	(Hideki Tojo)	73.31%	466	(D) March 31, 1937	14,618,298	Rikken Minseitō	179	38.41%	Shōwa (era)
21st	30 April 1942	Hideki Tojo	83.16%	466	(E) April 29, 1942	14,594,287	Imperial Rule Assistance Association	381	81.75%	Shōwa (era)
21st	30 April 1942	(Kuniaki Koiso)	83.16%	466	(E) April 29, 1942	14,594,287	Imperial Rule Assistance Association	381	81.75%	Shōwa (era)
21st	30 April 1942	(Kantarō Suzuki)	83.16%	466	(E) April 29, 1942	14,594,287	Imperial Rule Assistance Association	381	81.75%	Shōwa (era)
21st	30 April 1942	(Kantarō Suzuki)	83.16%	466	(E) April 29, 1942	14,594,287	Imperial Rule Assistance Association	381	81.75%	Shōwa (era)
21st	30 April 1942	(Prince Naruhiko Higashikuni)	83.16%	466	(E) April 29, 1942	14,594,287	Imperial Rule Assistance Association	381	81.75%	Shōwa (era)
21st	30 April 1942	(Kijūrō Shidehara)	83.16%	466	(E) April 29, 1942	14,594,287	Imperial Rule Assistance Association	381	81.75%	Shōwa (era)
22nd	April 10, 1946	Shigeru Yoshida	72.08%	466	(D) December 18, 1945	36,878,420	Liberal	141	30.25%	Shōwa (era)
23rd	25 April 1947	Tetsu Katayama	67.95%	466	(D) March 31, 1947	40,907,493	Socialist	143	30.68%	Shōwa (era)
23rd	25 April 1947	(Hitoshi Ashida)	67.95%	466	(D) March 31, 1947	40,907,493	Socialist	143	30.68%	Shōwa (era)
23rd	25 April 1947	(Shigeru Yoshida)	67.95%	466	(D) March 31, 1947	40,907,493	Socialist	143	30.68%	Shōwa (era)
National Diet (1947–present); upper house: Senate										Shōwa (era)
24th	23 January 1949	Shigeru Yoshida	74.04%	466	(D) December 23, 1948	42,105,300	Democratic Liberal	264	56.65%	Shōwa (era)
24th	23 January 1949	(Shigeru Yoshida)	74.04%	466	(D) December 23, 1948	42,105,300	Democratic Liberal	264	56.65%	Shōwa (era)
25th	October 1, 1952	Shigeru Yoshida	76.43%	466	(D) August 28, 1952	46,772,584	Liberal	240	51.50%	Shōwa (era)
26th	19 April 1953	Shigeru Yoshida	74.22%	466	(D) March 14, 1953	47,090,167	Liberal; Yoshida faction	199	42.70%	Shōwa (era)
26th	19 April 1953	(Ichirō Hatoyama)	74.22%	466	(D) March 14, 1953	47,090,167	Liberal; Yoshida faction	199	42.70%	Shōwa (era)
27th	27 February 1955	Ichirō Hatoyama	75.84%	467	(D) January 24, 1955	49,235,375	Democratic	185	39.61%	Shōwa (era)
27th	27 February 1955	(Ichirō Hatoyama)	75.84%	467	(D) January 24, 1955	49,235,375	Democratic	185	39.61%	Shōwa (era)
27th	27 February 1955	(Tanzan Ishibashi)	75.84%	467	(D) January 24, 1955	49,235,375	Democratic	185	39.61%	Shōwa (era)
27th	27 February 1955	(Nobusuke Kishi)	75.84%	467	(D) January 24, 1955	49,235,375	Democratic	185	39.61%	Shōwa (era)
28th	22 May 1958	Nobusuke Kishi	76.99%	467	(D) April 25, 1958	52,013,529	Liberal Democratic	287	61.45%	Shōwa (era)
28th	22 May 1958	(Hayato Ikeda)	76.99%	467	(D) April 25, 1958	52,013,529	Liberal Democratic	287	61.45%	Shōwa (era)
29th	November 20, 1960	Hayato Ikeda	73.51%	467	(D) October 24, 1960	54,312,993	Liberal Democratic	296	63.38%	Shōwa (era)
30th	21 November 1963	Hayato Ikeda	71.14%	467	(D) October 23, 1963	58,281,678	Liberal Democratic	283	60.59%	Shōwa (era)
30th	21 November 1963	(Eisaku Satō)	71.14%	467	(D) October 23, 1963	58,281,678	Liberal Democratic	283	60.59%	Shōwa (era)
31st	January 29, 1967	Eisaku Satō	73.99%	486	(D) December 27, 1966	62,992,796	Liberal Democratic	277	56.99%	Shōwa (era)
32nd	27 December 1969	Eisaku Satō	68.51%	486	(D) December 2, 1969	69,260,424	Liberal Democratic	288	59.25%	Shōwa (era)
32nd	27 December 1969	(Kakuei Tanaka)	68.51%	486	(D) December 2, 1969	69,260,424	Liberal Democratic	288	59.25%	Shōwa (era)
33rd	10 December 1972	Kakuei Tanaka	71.76%	491	(D) November 13, 1972	73,769,636	Liberal Democratic	271	55.19%	Shōwa (era)
33rd	10 December 1972	(Takeo Miki)	71.76%	491	(D) November 13, 1972	73,769,636	Liberal Democratic	271	55.19%	Shōwa (era)
34th	5 December 1976	Takeo Fukuda	73.45%	511	(E) December 9, 1976	77,926,588	Liberal Democratic	249	48.72%	Shōwa (era)
34th	5 December 1976	(Masayoshi Ōhira)	73.45%	511	(E) December 9, 1976	77,926,588	Liberal Democratic	249	48.72%	Shōwa (era)
35th	October 7, 1979	Masayoshi Ōhira	68.01%	511	(D) September 7, 1979	80,169,924	Liberal Democratic	248	48.53%	Shōwa (era)
36th	22 June 1980	Zenkō Suzuki	74.57%	511	(D) May 19, 1980	80,925,034	Liberal Democratic	284	55.57%	Shōwa (era)
36th	22 June 1980	(Yasuhiro Nakasone)	74.57%	511	(D) May 19, 1980	80,925,034	Liberal Democratic	284	55.57%	Shōwa (era)
37th	December 18, 1983	Yasuhiro Nakasone	67.94%	511	(D) November 28, 1983	84,252,608	Liberal Democratic	250	48.92%	Shōwa (era)
38th	2 June 1986	Yasuhiro Nakasone	71.40%	512	(D) June 2, 1986	86,426,845	Liberal Democratic	300	58.59%	Shōwa (era)
38th	2 June 1986	(Noboru Takeshita)	71.40%	512	(D) June 2, 1986	86,426,845	Liberal Democratic	300	58.59%	Shōwa (era)
38th	2 June 1986	(Sōsuke Uno)	71.40%	512	(D) June 2, 1986	86,426,845	Liberal Democratic	300	58.59%	Akihito (Heisei) (era)
38th	2 June 1986	(Toshiki Kaifu)	71.40%	512	(D) June 2, 1986	86,426,845	Liberal Democratic	300	58.59%	Akihito (Heisei) (era)
39th	18 February 1990	Toshiki Kaifu	73.31%	512	(D) January 24, 1990	90,322,908	Liberal Democratic	275	53.71%	Akihito (Heisei) (era)
39th	18 February 1990	(Kiichi Miyazawa)	73.31%	512	(D) January 24, 1990	90,322,908	Liberal Democratic	275	53.71%	Akihito (Heisei) (era)
40th	18 July 1993	Morihiro Hosokawa	67.26%	511	(D) June 18, 1993	94,477,816	Liberal Democratic	223	43.63%	Akihito (Heisei) (era)
40th	18 July 1993	(Tsutomu Hata)	67.26%	511	(D) June 18, 1993	94,477,816	Liberal Democratic	223	43.63%	Akihito (Heisei) (era)
40th	18 July 1993	(Tomiichi Murayama)	67.26%	511	(D) June 18, 1993	94,477,816	Liberal Democratic	223	43.63%	Akihito (Heisei) (era)
40th	18 July 1993	(Ryūtarō Hashimoto)	67.26%	511	(D) June 18, 1993	94,477,816	Liberal Democratic	223	43.63%	Akihito (Heisei) (era)
41st	20 October 1996	Ryūtarō Hashimoto	59.65%	500	(D) September 27, 1996	97,680,719	Liberal Democratic	239	47.80%	Akihito (Heisei) (era)
41st	20 October 1996	(Keizō Obuchi)	59.65%	500	(D) September 27, 1996	97,680,719	Liberal Democratic	239	47.80%	Akihito (Heisei) (era)
41st	20 October 1996	(Yoshirō Mori)	59.65%	500	(D) September 27, 1996	97,680,719	Liberal Democratic	239	47.80%	Akihito (Heisei) (era)
42nd	25 June 2000	Yoshirō Mori	62.49%	480	(D) June 2, 2000	100,492,328	Liberal Democratic	233	48.54%	Akihito (Heisei) (era)
42nd	25 June 2000	(Junichiro Koizumi)	62.49%	480	(D) June 2, 2000	100,492,328	Liberal Democratic	233	48.54%	Akihito (Heisei) (era)

=== 21st century ===
Election	Date	Prime Minister appointed by Emperor (during term)	Turnout	Seats	Date of dissolution (D) / expiration of term (E)	Registered voters	Largest party / Seats Share			Emperor
43rd	9 November 2003	Junichiro Koizumi	59.86%	480	(D) 10 October 2003	102,306,684	Liberal Democratic	237	49.37%	Akihito (Heisei) (era)
44th	11 September 2005	Junichiro Koizumi	67.51%	480	(D) 8 August 2005	103,067,966	Liberal Democratic	296	61.66%	Akihito (Heisei) (era)
44th	11 September 2005	(Shinzo Abe)	67.51%	480	(D) 8 August 2005	103,067,966	Liberal Democratic	296	61.66%	Akihito (Heisei) (era)
44th	11 September 2005	(Yasuo Fukuda)	67.51%	480	(D) 8 August 2005	103,067,966	Liberal Democratic	296	61.66%	Akihito (Heisei) (era)
44th	11 September 2005	(Tarō Asō)	67.51%	480	(D) 8 August 2005	103,067,966	Liberal Democratic	296	61.66%	Akihito (Heisei) (era)
45th	30 August 2009	Yukio Hatoyama	69.28%	480	(D) 21 July 2009	104,057,361	Democratic	308	64.16%	Akihito (Heisei) (era)
45th	30 August 2009	(Naoto Kan)	69.28%	480	(D) 21 July 2009	104,057,361	Democratic	308	64.16%	Akihito (Heisei) (era)
45th	30 August 2009	(Yoshihiko Noda)	69.28%	480	(D) 21 July 2009	104,057,361	Democratic	308	64.16%	Akihito (Heisei) (era)
46th	16 December 2012	Shinzo Abe	59.32%	480	(D) 16 November 2012	103,959,866	Liberal Democratic	294	61.25%	Akihito (Heisei) (era)
47th	14 December 2014	Shinzo Abe	52.66%	475	(D) 21 November 2014	104,067,104	Liberal Democratic	291	61.26%	Akihito (Heisei) (era)
48th	22 October 2017	Shinzo Abe	53.68%	465	(D) 28 September 2017	106,091,229	Liberal Democratic	284	61.08%	Akihito (Heisei) (era)
48th	22 October 2017	(Yoshihide Suga)	53.68%	465	(D) 28 September 2017	106,091,229	Liberal Democratic	284	61.08%	Naruhito (Reiwa) (era)
48th	22 October 2017	(Fumio Kishida)	53.68%	465	(D) 28 September 2017	106,091,229	Liberal Democratic	284	61.08%	Naruhito (Reiwa) (era)
49th	31 October 2021	Fumio Kishida	55.93%	465	(D) 14 October 2021	105,622,758	Liberal Democratic	261	56.12%	Naruhito (Reiwa) (era)
49th	31 October 2021	(Shigeru Ishiba)	55.93%	465	(D) 14 October 2021	105,622,758	Liberal Democratic	261	56.12%	Naruhito (Reiwa) (era)
50th	27 October 2024	Shigeru Ishiba	53.85%	465	(D) 9 October 2024	103,880,749	Liberal Democratic	191	41.08%	Naruhito (Reiwa) (era)
50th	27 October 2024	(Sanae Takaichi)	53.85%	465	(D) 9 October 2024	103,880,749	Liberal Democratic	191	41.08%	Naruhito (Reiwa) (era)
51st	8 February 2026	Sanae Takaichi	56.26%	465	(D) 23 January 2026	103,211,224	Liberal Democratic	316	67.96%	Naruhito (Reiwa) (era)

== See also ==
- National Diet
  - Senate (Japan)
- List of districts of the House of Representatives of Japan
- List of current members of the House of Representatives of Japan
- Speaker of the House of Representatives (Japan)
- Sekihairitsu, the system used in elections for the House of Representatives to determine the order of candidates on a proportional representation list
