= 1952 Japanese general election =

- 1 October 1952

All 466 seats in the House of Representatives 234 seats needed for a majority
- Turnout: 76.43% (▲2.39pp)
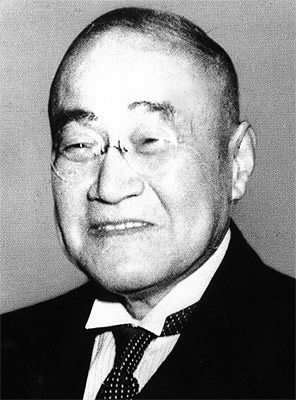

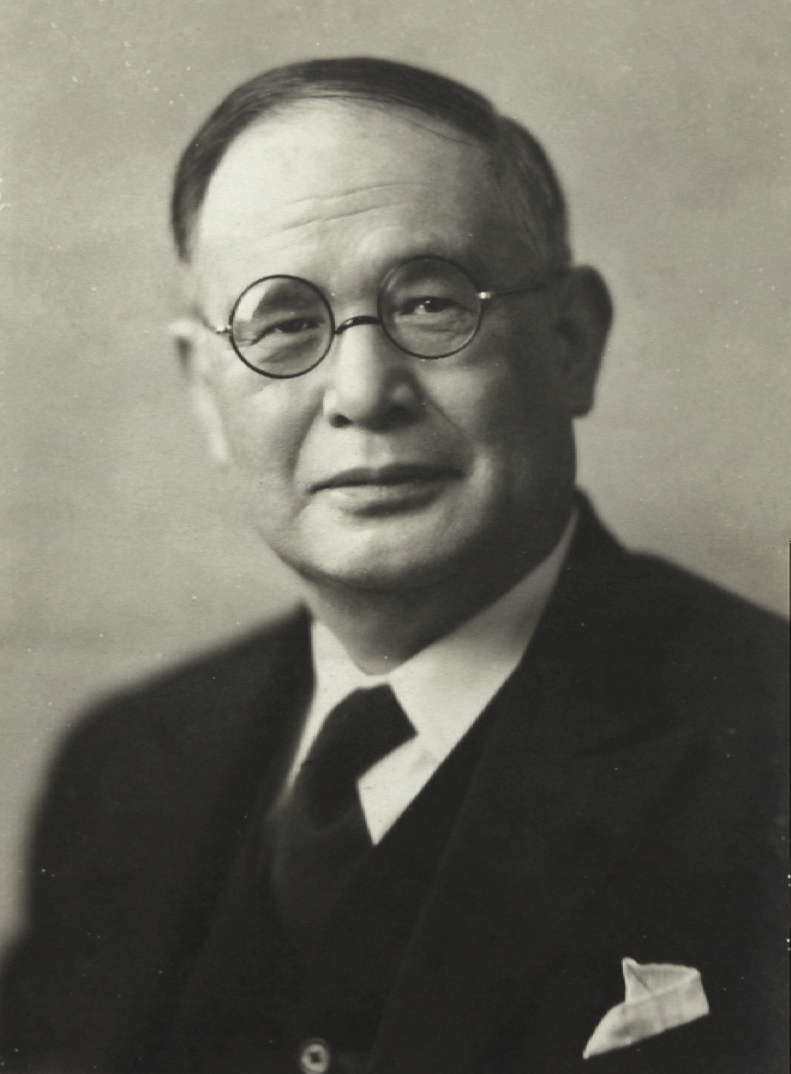

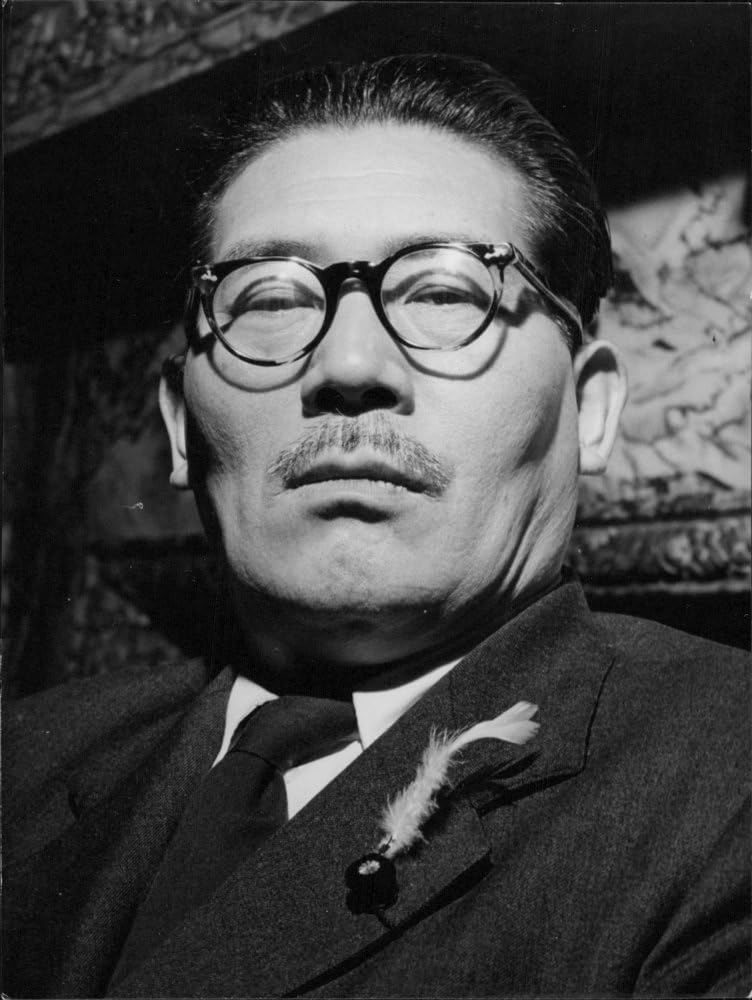

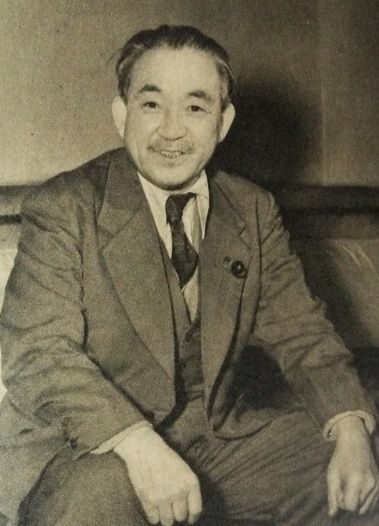

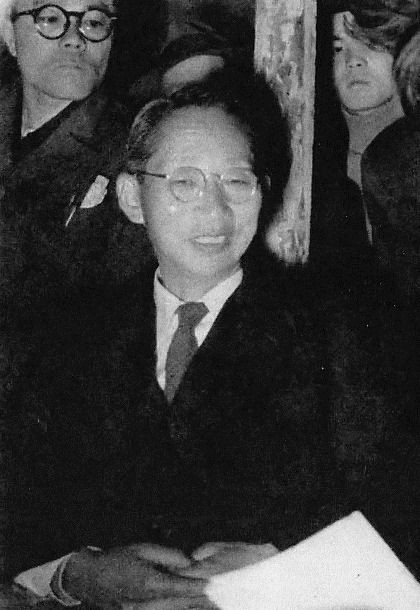
	First party	Second party	Third party
Leader	Shigeru Yoshida	Mamoru Shigemitsu	Inejirō Asanuma (Note: Due to a split in the Socialist Party, the chairman position was left vacant, and Secretary-General Asanuma served as acting chairman.)
Party	Liberal	Kaishintō	Right Socialist
Last election	Did not exist	Did not exist	Did not exist
Seats won	240	85	57
Seat change	New	New	New
Popular vote	16,938,221	6,429,450	4,108,274
Percentage	47.93%	18.19%	11.63%
Swing	New	New	New
	Fourth party	Fifth party
Leader	Mosaburō Suzuki	Hisao Kuroda
Party	Left Socialist	Labourers and Farmers
Last election	Did not exist	1.98%, 7 seats
Seats won	54	4
Seat change	New	▼3
Popular vote	3,398,597	261,190
Percentage	9.62%	0.74%
Swing	New	▼1.24pp
- Districts shaded according to winners' vote strength
Prime Minister before election
Shigeru Yoshida
Liberal
Elected Prime Minister
Shigeru Yoshida
Liberal

General elections were held in Japan on 1 October 1952. The result was a victory for the Liberal Party, which won 242 of the 466 seats. Voter turnout was 76.4%.

== Results ==
Party	Votes	%	Seats	+/–
Liberal Party	16,938,221	47.93	240	New
Kaishintō	6,429,450	18.19	85	New
Right Socialist Party of Japan	4,108,274	11.63	57	New
Left Socialist Party of Japan	3,398,597	9.62	54	New
Japanese Communist Party	896,765	2.54	0	−35
Cooperative Party	390,015	1.10	2	New
Labourers and Farmers Party	261,190	0.74	4	–3
Japan Reconstruction Federation	185,108	0.52	1	New
Japan Teachers Political Federation	114,869	0.33	2	New
Fukuoka Rural Federation	59,949	0.17	1	–1
Japan People's Party	57,894	0.16	1	+1
National Liaison Group for the Reconstruction of the Socialist Party	33,617	0.10	0	New
New Liberal Party	27,327	0.08	0	–2
Rikken Yōseikai	18,570	0.05	0	–1
Greater Japan Patriotic Party	17,257	0.05	0	New
Tosa Farmers Union	9,592	0.03	0	New
United Socialist Party	7,826	0.02	0	New
Yamato Party	7,041	0.02	0	New
Social Democratic Party (Oda Toshiyo)	6,609	0.02	0	New
Pro-American Fraternal Labor Party	5,719	0.02	0	0
World Party	3,972	0.01	0	New
Greater Japan Independent Youth Party	1,826	0.01	0	0
Constitutional Japan National Party	1,559	0.00	0	New
National Socialist Japanese Workers' Party	286	0.00	0	New
Independents	2,355,172	6.66	19	+7
Total	35,336,705	100.00	466	0
Valid votes	35,336,705	98.85		
Invalid/blank votes	412,349	1.15		
Total votes	35,749,054	100.00		
Registered voters/turnout	46,772,584	76.43		
Source: Oscarsson, Masumi, Ministry of Home Affairs

=== By prefecture ===
Prefecture	Total seats	Seats won						
Prefecture	Total seats	LP	Kaishintō	RSPJ	LSPJ	LFP	Others	Ind.
Aichi	19	9	4	1	4			1
Akita	8	4	2	2				
Aomori	7	4	3					
Chiba	13	8	3	1	1			
Ehime	9	6	1		1		1	
Fukui	4	4						
Fukuoka	19	6	3	4	4		1	1
Fukushima	12	7	2	2	1			
Gifu	9	4	2		2			1
Gunma	10	2	4	2	1			1
Hiroshima	12	8	3	1				
Hokkaido	22	9	4		7	2		
Hyōgo	18	8	5	3	1			1
Ibaraki	12	7	3			1		1
Ishikawa	6	3	2					1
Iwate	8	6	1	1				
Kagawa	6	4		1	1			
Kagoshima	10	7	1	1	1			
Kanagawa	13	6	2	4	1			
Kōchi	5	4	1					
Kumamoto	10	4	3		1		1	1
Kyoto	10	4	2	1	2		1	
Mie	9	3	5					1
Miyagi	9	4		3	1		1	
Miyazaki	6	4	1	1				
Nagano	13	8	2	2	1			
Nagasaki	9	5	2	1	1			
Nara	5	3			1			1
Niigata	15	8	3	2	2			
Ōita	7	2	2	1				2
Okayama	10	7			1	1		1
Osaka	19	9	2	6	2			
Saga	5	2			1			2
Saitama	13	10		2				1
Shiga	5	2	1	2				
Shimane	5	2	1	1			1	
Shizuoka	14	10	1		3			
Tochigi	10	5	3	1	1			
Tokushima	5	1	3		1			
Tokyo	27	11	2	9	5			
Tottori	4	2	1		1			
Toyama	6	3	3					
Wakayama	6	1	2		2			1
Yamagata	8	6			2			
Yamaguchi	9	6		2				1
Yamanashi	5	2			1		1	1
Total	466	240	85	57	54	4	7	19
