= 1953 Japanese general election =

- 19 April 1953

All 466 seats in the House of Representatives 234 seats needed for a majority
- Turnout: 74.21% (▼2.22pp)
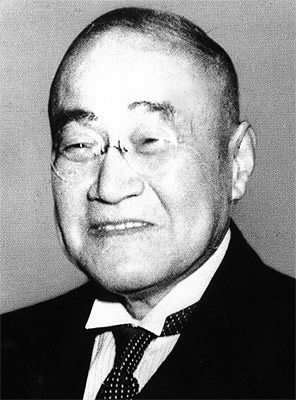

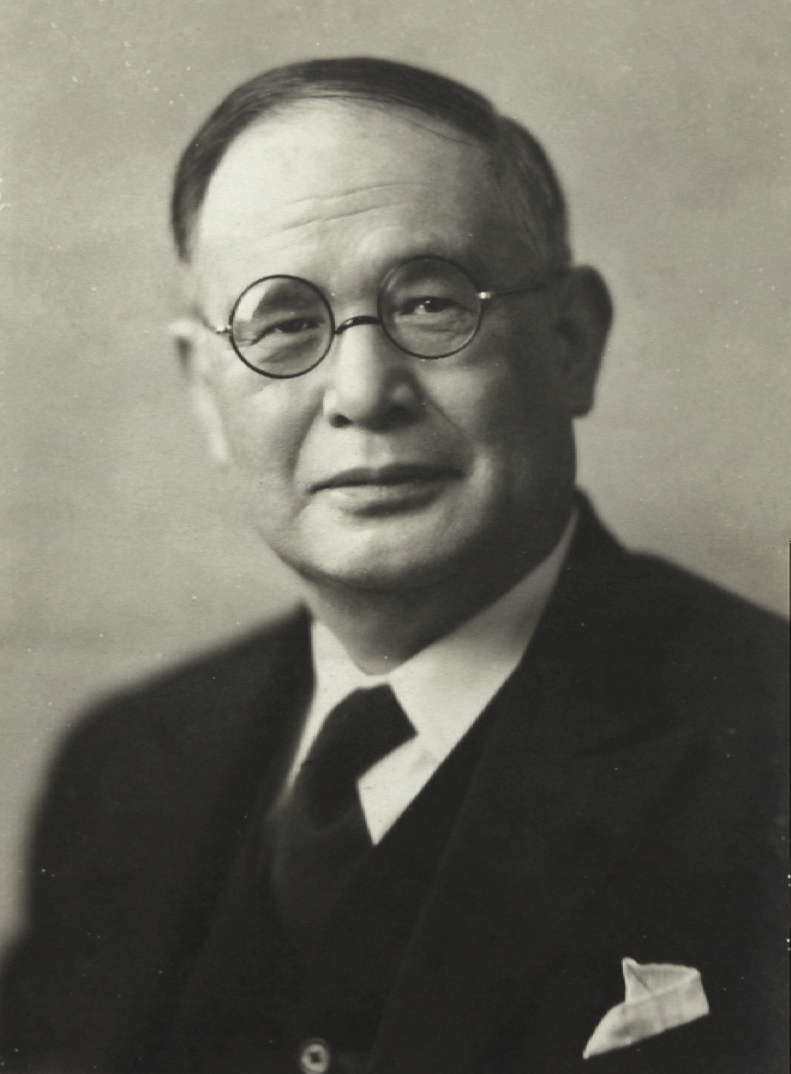

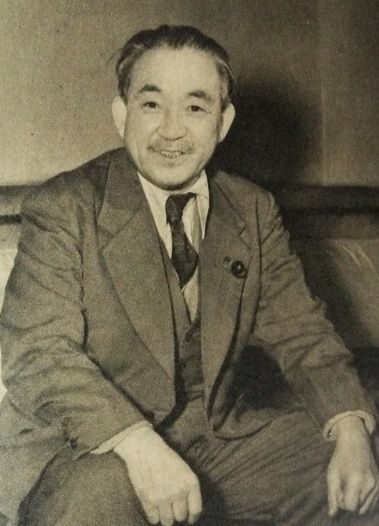

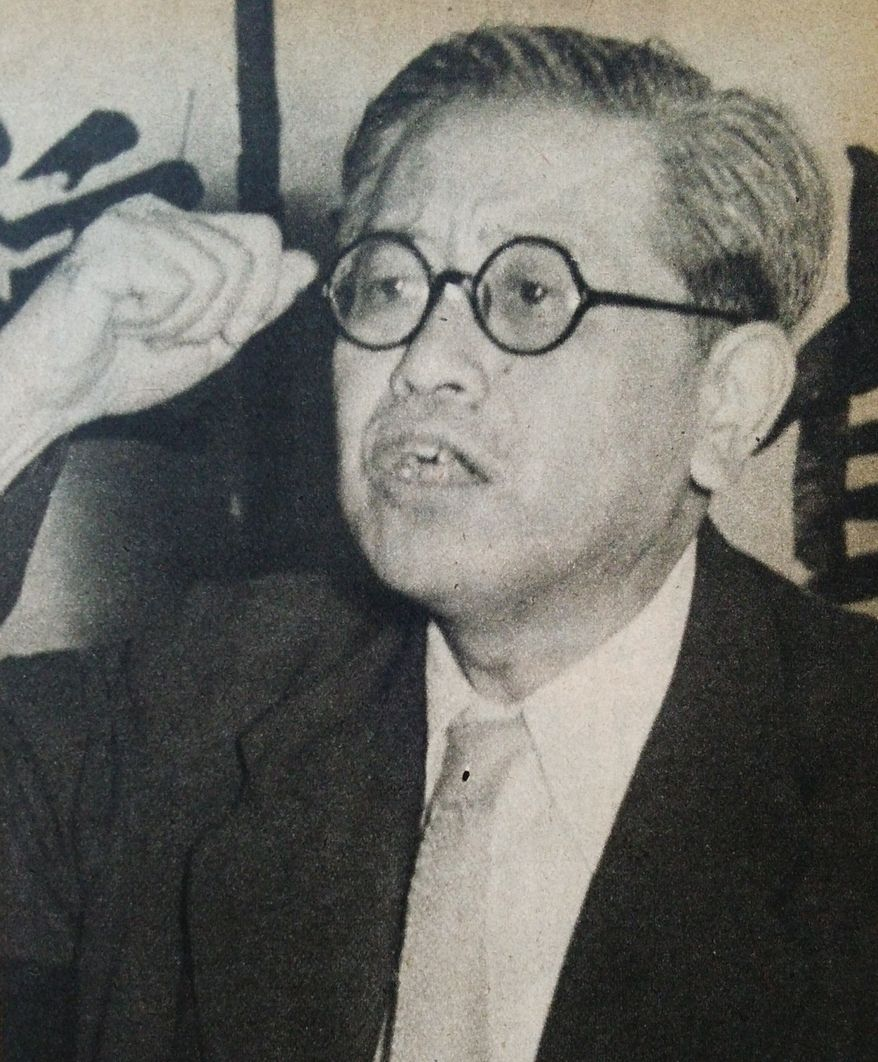

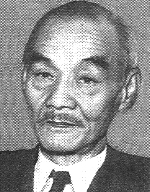
	First party	Second party	Third party
Leader	Shigeru Yoshida	Mamoru Shigemitsu	Mosaburō Suzuki
Party	Liberal	Kaishintō	Left Socialist
Last election	47.93%, 240 seats	18.19%, 85 seats	9.62%, 54 seats
Seats won	199	76	72
Seat change	▼41	▼9	▲18
Popular vote	13,476,428	6,186,232	4,516,715
Percentage	38.95%	17.88%	13.05%
Swing	▼8.98pp	▼0.31pp	▲3.43pp
	Fourth party	Fifth party
Leader	Jōtarō Kawakami	Bukichi Miki
Party	Right Socialist	Liberal Party–Hatoyama
Last election	11.63%, 57 seats	Did not exist
Seats won	66	35
Seat change	▲9	New
Popular vote	4,677,833	3,054,688
Percentage	13.52%	8.83%
Swing	▲1.89pp	New
- Districts shaded according to winners' vote strength
Prime Minister before election
Shigeru Yoshida
Liberal
Elected Prime Minister
Shigeru Yoshida
Liberal

General elections were held in Japan on 19 April 1953. The result saw the ruling Liberal Party win 199 of the 466 seats. Voter turnout was 74%.

== Results ==
Party	Votes	%	Seats	+/–
Liberal Party	13,476,428	38.95	199	−41
Kaishintō	6,186,232	17.88	76	−13
Rightist Socialist Party of Japan	4,677,833	13.52	66	+9
Leftist Socialist Party of Japan	4,516,715	13.05	72	+18
Liberal Party–Hatoyama	3,054,688	8.83	35	New
Japanese Communist Party	655,990	1.90	1	+1
Labourers and Farmers Party	358,773	1.04	5	+1
Japan People's Party	73,472	0.21	1	0
National Liaison Group for the Reconstruction of the Socialist Party	28,560	0.08	0	0
Rikken Yōseikai	21,981	0.06	0	0
Greater Japan Patriotic Party	13,029	0.04	0	0
Yasukuni New Politics Party	4,322	0.01	0	New
World Party	4,248	0.01	0	0
United Socialist Party	4,057	0.01	0	0
Association for Protecting the National Spirit	1,197	0.00	0	New
Japan Peace Party	787	0.00	0	New
National Socialist Japanese Workers' Party	397	0.00	0	0
Independents	1,523,736	4.40	11	−8
Total	34,602,445	100.00	466	0
Valid votes	34,602,445	99.02		
Invalid/blank votes	342,675	0.98		
Total votes	34,945,120	100.00		
Registered voters/turnout	47,090,167	74.21		
Source: Oscarsson, Masumi, Ministry of Home Affairs

=== By prefecture ===
Prefecture	Total seats	Seats won								
Prefecture	Total seats	LP	Kaishintō	LSPJ	RSPJ	LP–H	LFP	JCP	JPP	Ind.
Aichi	19	8	5	5	1					
Akita	8	1	2	1	2	2				
Aomori	7	4	2	1						
Chiba	13	4	3	1	1	4				
Ehime	9	5	1	2	1					
Fukui	4	3		1						
Fukuoka	19	7	3	5	4					
Fukushima	12	6	2	1	2	1				
Gifu	9	3	1	2	1					2
Gunma	10	3	4	1						2
Hiroshima	12	7	1	1	2	1				
Hokkaido	22	8	4	6	1	1	2			
Hyōgo	18	9	3	1	4	1				
Ibaraki	12	8	3							1
Ishikawa	6	3	1		1					1
Iwate	8	4	1	2	1					
Kagawa	6	2	1	1		2				
Kagoshima	10	6	2	1	1					
Kanagawa	13	3	1	2	3	4				
Kōchi	5	4			1					
Kumamoto	10	4	4		1					1
Kyoto	10	4	2	2	2					
Mie	9	2	4		2	1				
Miyagi	9	4	1	1	2				1	
Miyazaki	6	3	1	1	1					
Nagano	13	7	2	2	2					
Nagasaki	9	5	2	1	1					
Nara	5	3		1	1					
Niigata	15	3	2	3	3	3				1
Ōita	7	4	2		1					
Okayama	10	6		2			2			
Osaka	19	9		3	5	1		1		
Saga	5	3	1	1						
Saitama	13	7			4	2				
Shiga	5		2		2	1				
Shimane	5	2	1		1					1
Shizuoka	14	7	1	3		2	1			
Tochigi	10	4	2	2	1	1				
Tokushima	5	2	2	1						
Tokyo	27	7	1	6	8	5				
Tottori	4	1	2	1						
Toyama	6	2	3	1						
Wakayama	6	3		2		1				
Yamagata	8	4		2		2				
Yamaguchi	9	4		2	2					1
Yamanashi	5	1	1	1	1					1
Total	466	199	76	72	66	35	5	1	1	11

== See also ==
- "you idiot" dissolution - A nickname of the dissolution of the House that led to the 1953 general election.
