= Liberal Party (Japan, 1950) =

Liberal Party 自由党 Jiyūtō
- Founder: Shigeru Yoshida
- Founded: March 1950
- Dissolved: 15 November 1955
- Merger of: Democratic Liberal Party; Democratic Party (coalition faction)
- Merged into: Liberal Democratic Party
- Ideology: Conservatism (Japanese); Pro-Americanism
- Political position: Centre-right to right-wing

The Liberal Party (自由党, Jiyūtō) was a political party in Japan. The party has been described as centre-right to right-wing, conservative, and pro-American. The party's mainstream consisted of the centrist conservatives who held a centrist vision.

The Liberal Party was founded in 1950 as a merger of the Democratic Liberal Party and a part of the Alliance faction of the Democratic Party. DLP leader and Prime Minister Shigeru Yoshida became the party's leader In the 1950 House of Councillors elections, it won the most seats. It also won a mjaority of the seats in the 1952 general election. Yoshida's government lost a vote of no-confidence in 1953, leading to an early election. Additionally, a faction led by Ichirō Hatoyama broke away to form the Liberal Party–Hatoyama. The party lost its majority in the early election, as well as the majority in the upper house following the House of Councillor election. Yoshida formed a minority government, while members of the Liberal Party–Hatoyama rejoined the party

In 1954, a faction of the party broke away to merge with the Japan Liberal Party and the Kaishintō to form the Japan Democratic Party (JDP). Yoshida resigned following a no-confidence vote, leading Hatoyama of the JDP to become Prime Minister. The Liberal Party lost the 1955 general election, which was won by the JDP. The same year, the two parties merged to form the Liberal Democratic Party.

== History ==
The party was established in March 1950 as a merger of the Democratic Liberal Party led by Prime Minister Shigeru Yoshida (which held a majority in the House of Representatives) and 22 MPs from the Alliance faction of the Democratic Party, although Alliance leader Takeru Inukai did not join the new party. In the April 1950 House of Councillors election, it won 52 of the 132 seats.

In August 1952, Ichirō Hatoyama was allowed to rejoin the party, having been banned from politics as a result of the purge. A former leader of the original post-war Liberal Party, he expected Yoshida to allow him to take over the party again, but was rebuffed. This led to increasing tensions within the party, splitting it into Hatoyama and Yoshida factions.

Although the party won a majority of seats in the House of Representatives in the October 1952 election, winning 242 of the 466 seats, Yoshida's government lost a vote of no-confidence in March 1953, leading to an early election. Prior to polling day, the Hatoyama faction broke away to form Liberal Party–Hatoyama, which won 35 seats in the elections as the Liberal Party was reduced to 202 seats. The simultaneous House of Councillor election also saw the party lose is majority in the upper house. However, Yoshida was able to form a minority government, and later in the year Hatoyama and 25 other Liberal Party–Hatoyama MPs rejoined the Liberal Party.

Another split occurred in November 1954 when 35 MPs left the Liberal Party to merge with the Japan Liberal Party and the Kaishintō to form the Japan Democratic Party (JDP). A no-confidence motion was passed shortly afterwards, resulting in the resignation of Yoshida and Hatoyama, now a member of the JDP, becoming the new prime minister.

In the February 1955 general election, the party was reduced to 114 seats as it was defeated by the JDP. On 15 November that year the two parties merged to form the Liberal Democratic Party.

== Leaders ==
#	Name	Portrait	From	To
1	Shigeru Yoshida		1 March 1950	8 December 1954
2	Taketora Ogata		8 December 1954	15 November 1955

== Election results ==
=== House of Representatives ===
Election	Leader	Candidates	Seats	Change	Status
1952	Shigeru Yoshida	475	240 / 466	Steady	Government
1953	Shigeru Yoshida	316	199 / 466	▼41	Government
1955	Taketora Ogata	248	112 / 467	▼87	Democratic-Liberal Party coalition

=== House of Councillors ===
Election	Leader	Seats		Status
Election	Leader	Won	Total	Status
1950	Shigeru Yoshida	52 / 132	76 / 250	Governing minority
1953	Shigeru Yoshida	46 / 128	93 / 250	Governing minority
