= Liberal Party–Hatoyama =

Japanese political party in 1953

The Liberal Party–Hatoyama (Japanese: 鳩山自由党 (分派自由党)) was a political party in Japan. It was active during 1953.

== History ==
The party was established in March 1953, shortly before the April elections, by a group of 22 Diet members belonging to the Liberal Party who were supporters of Ichirō Hatoyama; within two days it gained a further 15 seats when the Kozen Hirokawa faction also defected.

Of the 102 candidates nominated by the party for the House of Representatives, 35 were elected. However, the party failed to win a seat in the simultaneous House of Councillors elections. Talks were subsequently held with Kaishintō about a merger, but in November most of its Diet members rejoined the Liberal Party, with the exception of eight who subsequently formed the Japan Liberal Party.

== Election results ==
=== House of Representatives ===
Election	Votes	%	Seats	Position	Status
1953	3,054,688	8.83	35 / 466	4th	Opposition

=== House of Councillors ===
Election	Constituency			Party list			Seats		Position	Status
Election	Votes	%	Seats	Votes	%	Seats	Won	Total	Position	Status
1953	522,540	1.87	0 / 75	110,889	0.41	0 / 53	0 / 128	0 / 250	8th	Extraparliamentary
