= Japan Democratic Party =

Former Japanese political party

Japan Democratic Party 日本民主党 Nihon Minshutō
- Founders: Ichirō Hatoyama; Mamoru Shigemitsu; Nobusuke Kishi
- Founded: 24 November 1954
- Dissolved: 15 November 1955
- Merger of: Kaishintō; Liberal Party–Hatoyama
- Merged into: Liberal Democratic Party
- Ideology: Conservatism (Japanese); Ultraconservatism
- Political position: Right-wing

The Japan Democratic Party (日本民主党, Nihon Minshutō) was a political party in Japan. The party has been described as centre-right to right-wing conservative, and ultra-conservative.

Existing from 1954 to 1955, the party was founded by Ichirō Hatoyama, former foreign minister Mamoru Shigemitsu and future Prime Minister Nobusuke Kishi. The party was formed on 24 November 1954, by merging Ichiro Hatoyama's group which left the Liberal Party in 1953, and the Shigemitsu-led Kaishintō party. On 15 November 1955, the Japan Democrats merged with the Liberals to form the modern Liberal Democratic Party.

== Election results ==
=== House of Representatives ===
Election	Leader	Votes	%	Seats	Position	Status
1955	Ichirō Hatoyama	13,536,044	36.57	185 / 467	1st	Government

== See also ==
- Category:Democratic Party (Japan, 1954) politicians
