= Kaishintō =

Kaishintō 改進党
- President: Mamoru Shigemitsu
- Founded: 8 February 1952
- Dissolved: 24 November 1954
- Merger of: National Democratic Party, Shinsei Club and Farmers Cooperative Party
- Merged into: Japan Democratic Party
- Headquarters: Tokyo, Japan
- Ideology: Progressive conservatism Modified capitalism Japanese nationalism
- Political position: Centre

The Kaishintō (Japanese: 改進党, lit. 'Reformist Party') was a political party in Japan.

== History ==
The party was established on 8 February 1952 as a merger of the National Democratic Party and the Shinsei Club, together with most of the Farmers Cooperative Party's Diet members. In May Mamoru Shigemitsu was elected party president. The party started out as a progressive conservative party that advocated for political and social reform along the lines of co-operativism and a "modified capitalism", but it took a nationalist turn and started to advocate for rearmament.

Having started with 69 seats, the party won 85 in the 1952 general elections. In the 1953 elections it lost nine seats; it also won eight seats in the House of Councillors. In November 1954 it merged with the Liberal Party and a group of Diet members from the Liberal Party to form the Japan Democratic Party.

== Election result ==
=== House of Representatives ===
Election	Leader	Votes	%	Seats	+/–	Position	Status
1952	Mamoru Shigemitsu	6,429,450	18.19	85 / 466	new	2nd	Opposition
1953	Mamoru Shigemitsu	6,186,232	17.88	76 / 466	▼9	2nd	Opposition

=== House of Councillors ===
Election	Leader	Constituency			Party list			Seats		Position	Status
Election	Leader	Votes	%	Seats	Votes	%	Seats	Won	Total	Position	Status
1953	Mamoru Shigemitsu	2,840,345	10.14	5 / 75	1,630,507	6.03	3 / 53	8 / 128	15 / 250	5th	Opposition
