= Red Feather =

Red Feather may refer to:

- Red Feather (opera), 1903 opera by Reginald De Koven, Charles Klein, and Charles Emerson Cook
- Red Feather Development Group, non-profit for Native American communities
- Central Community Chest of Japan, non-profit also known as "Red Feather"
- Name for some Community Chest organizations
