= Aiichirō Fujiyama =

Japanese politician (1897–1985)

- 藤山 愛一郎
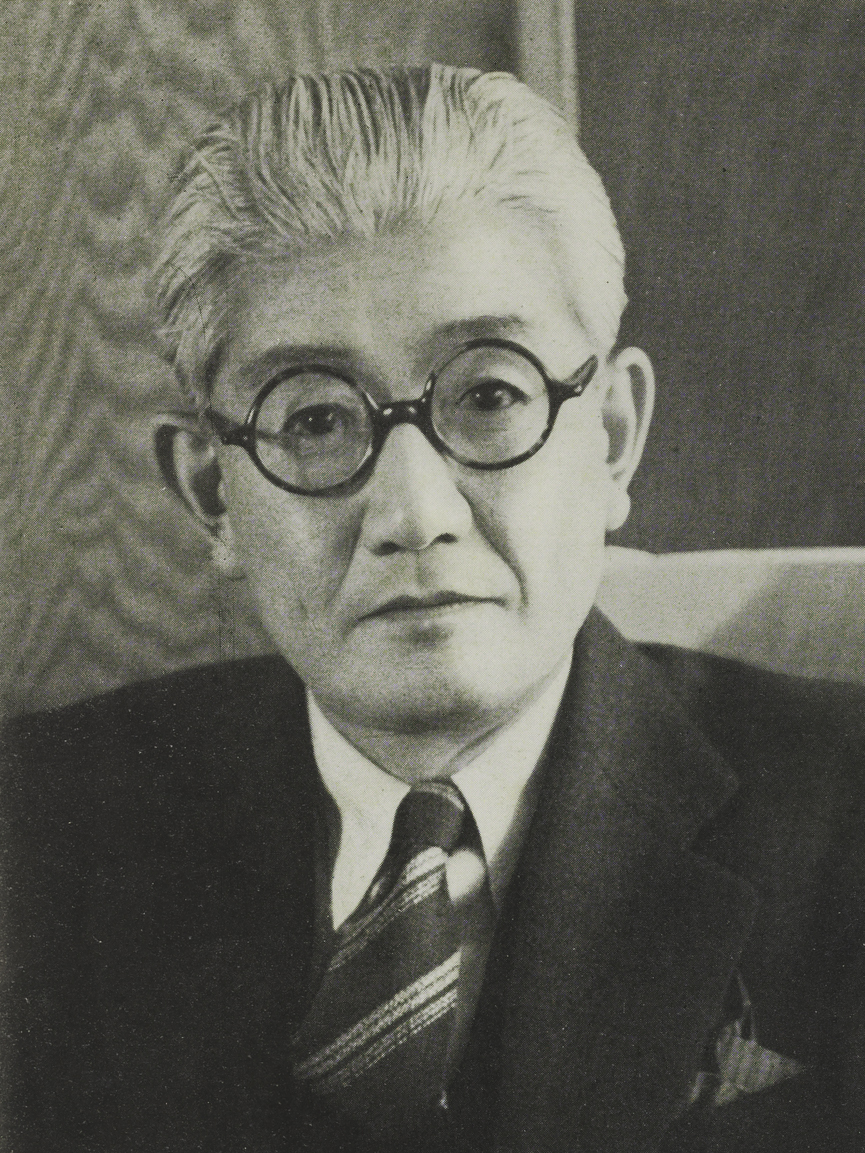
- Fujiyama in 1951

Director-General of the Economic Planning Agency
- In office 3 June 1965 – 4 November 1966
- Prime Minister: Eisaku Satō
- Preceded by: Mamoru Takahashi
- Succeeded by: Eisaku Satō (acting); Kiichi Miyazawa
- In office 18 July 1961 – 6 July 1962
- Prime Minister: Hayato Ikeda
- Preceded by: Hisatsune Sakomizu
- Succeeded by: Hayato Ikeda (acting); Kiichi Miyazawa

Minister for Foreign Affairs
- In office 10 July 1957 – 19 July 1960
- Prime Minister: Nobusuke Kishi
- Preceded by: Nobusuke Kishi
- Succeeded by: Zentaro Kosaka

Member of the House of Representatives
- In office 23 May 1958 – 9 December 1976
- Preceded by: Yoshimori Yoneda
- Succeeded by: Akira Kudō
- Constituency: Kanagawa 1st

Chairman of Japan Airlines
- In office August 1951 – September 1953
- Preceded by: Position established
- Succeeded by: Kunizō Hara

Personal details
- Born: 22 May 1897 Kita, Tokyo, Japan
- Died: 22 February 1985 (aged 87) Tokyo, Japan
- Party: Liberal Democratic
- Education: Keio University (incomplete)

Aiichirō Fujiyama (藤山 愛一郎, Fujiyama Aiichirō; May 22, 1897 – February 22, 1985) was a Japanese politician of the Liberal Democratic Party and business executive.

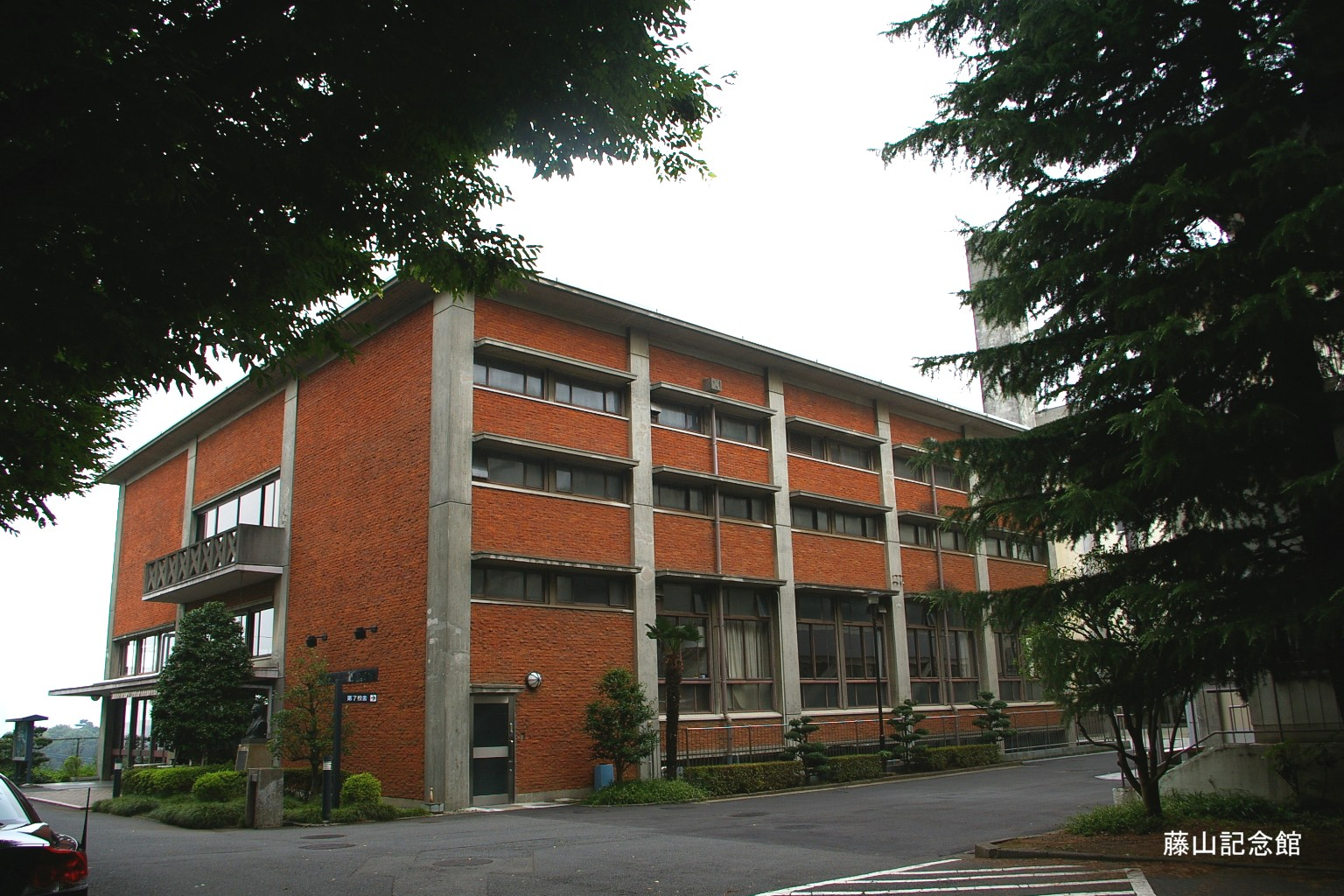
Fujiyama memorial hall in Keio University Hiyoshi campus

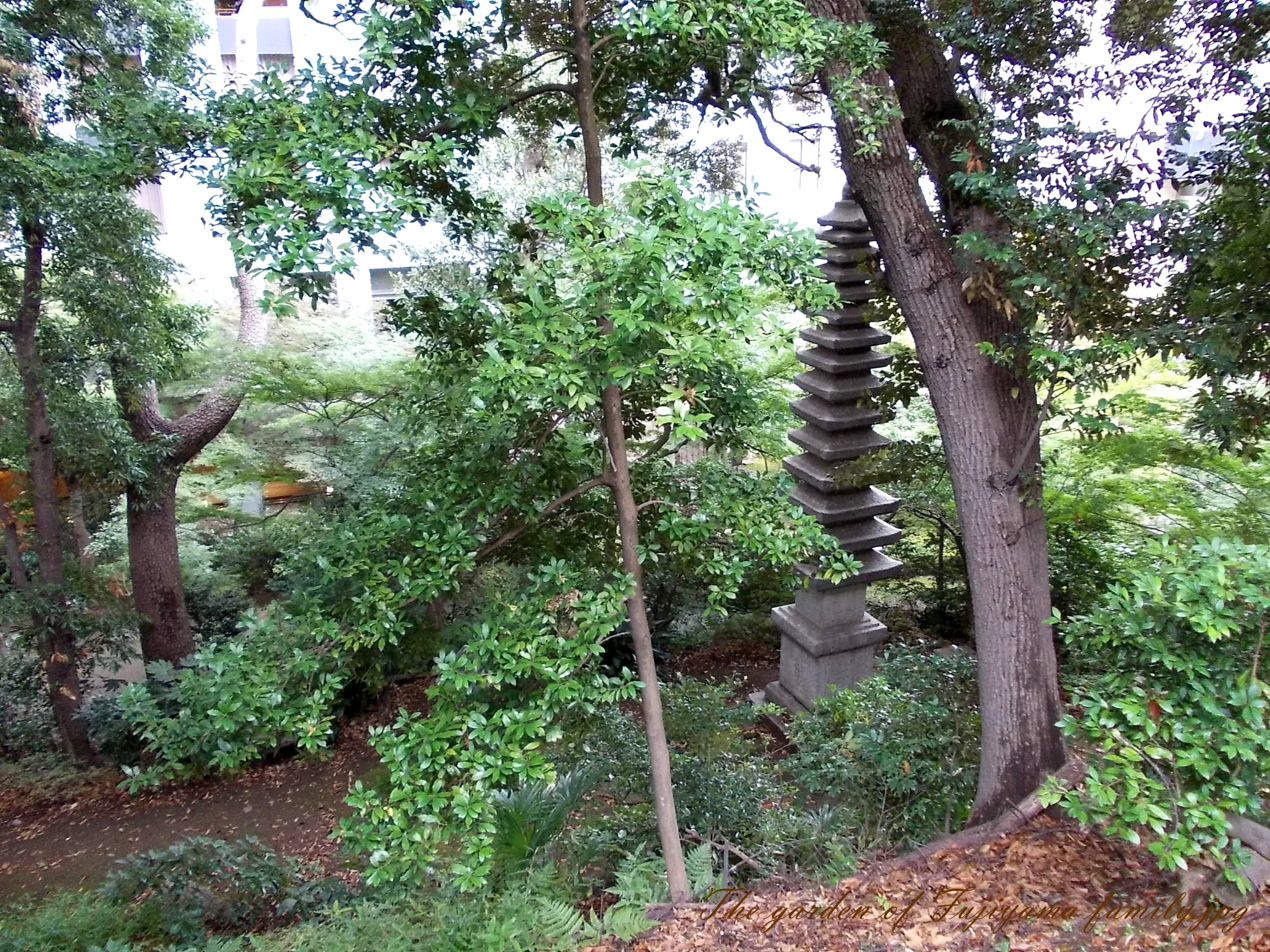
The garden of Fujiyama family

A business executive who symbolized "big business" in Japan as president of Dai Nippon Sugar Manufacturing Co. and executive officer of Nitto Chemical Industry Co., he used his influence to bring about the fall of Prime Minister Hideki Tōjō in 1944.

After Japan's World War II surrender, Fujiyama was imprisoned without a trial for three years, having been accused of war crimes. After his release he represented Japan at the 1951 UNESCO meeting in Paris and later served as Chairman of Japan Airlines (1951–1953).

In 1955 and 1956, Fujiyama, who was Chairman of the Japan Chamber of Commerce at the time, strongly supported Nobusuke Kishi as a successor to Ichirō Hatoyama to the President of the Liberal Democratic Party, according to a report by the Central Intelligence Agency.

Fujiyama was elected to Parliament in 1957 and was reelected five times. As Foreign Minister in the cabinet of Prime Minister Nobusuke Kishi (1957–1960), he headed Japan's first delegation to the United Nations (1957), helped revise the U.S.–Japan Security Treaty (1960), and promoted the restoration of diplomatic relations between Japan and China. He also served in the cabinet of Kishi's successor Hayato Ikeda as Director of Japan's Economic Planning Agency.

During the 1960s, he controlled a personal faction within the LDP, closely aligned with the Kishi faction, and ran unsuccessfully several times for presidency of the LDP.

In 1970, Fujiyama made an unsanctioned trip to the People's Republic of China in an effort to expand Japanese trade relations with China.

Political offices
| Preceded by Nobusuke Kishi | Minister for Foreign Affairs; 1957–1960 | Succeeded by Zentaro Kosaka |
| Preceded by Hisatsune Sakomizu | Director of the Economic Planning Agency; 1961–1962 | Succeeded by Hayato Ikeda; Acting |
| Preceded by Mamoru Takahashi | Director of the Economic Planning Agency; 1965–1966 | Succeeded by Eisaku Satō; Acting |
Party political offices
| Preceded by Munenori Akagi | Chairman of the General Council of the Liberal Democratic Party; 1963–1964 | Succeeded by Umekichi Nakamura |
Business positions
| Preceded by Yoshiaki Hatta | Chairman of the Japan Chamber of Commerce and Industry; 1941–1946 | Succeeded by Ryutaro Takahashi |
| Preceded by Shinsuke Asao | Chairman of the Japan Association of Corporate Executives; 1951–1952 | Succeeded by Masamichi Yamagiwa |
| New title | Chairman of Japan Airlines; 1951–1953 | Succeeded by Kunizō Hara |
| Preceded by Ryutaro Takahashi | Chairman of the Japan Chamber of Commerce and Industry; 1951–1957 | Succeeded by Tadashi Adachi |
Non-profit organization positions
| Preceded by Ryutaro Takahashi | President of the Community Chest of Tokyo; 1952–1957 | Succeeded by Tadashi Adachi |
