= Community Chest =

Community Chest originally referred to a box for holding money or other valuables kept by a small organization and requiring more than one key to be simultaneously turned to open its lock, preventing embezzlement by any single key holder. It may refer to:

Organizations:

- Community Chest (organization), a forerunner of the United Way of America
- The Community Chest of Hong Kong
- Community Chest of Korea
- Central Community Chest of Japan
- The Community Chest of Singapore

Other:

- Chance and Community Chest cards, an aspect of the game Monopoly
- Community Chest, a French communication agency that specialized in implementing brand presence in Second Life
- Monopoly Community Chest, a game on Family Game Night
- The Community Chest, an Australian rock band featuring Adem K
