= United Way =

American non-profit organization

United Way Worldwide
- Formation: 1887; Denver, Colorado, U.S.
- Type: Private non-profit
- Legal status: Active
- Purpose: Charitable organization
- Headquarters: 701 North Fairfax Street; Alexandria, Virginia 22314, U.S.
- Region served: Worldwide
- President and CEO: Angela F. Williams
- Revenue: US$ 75 million (2024)
- Expenses: US$ 77 million (2024)
- Endowment: US$ 8 million (2024)
- Website: www.unitedway.org

United Way is an international network of over 1,800 local nonprofit fundraising affiliates. Prior to 2015, United Way was the largest nonprofit organization in the United States by donations from the public. Individual United Ways mobilize fundraising campaigns to raise money for various nonprofits, with most donations coming through payroll deductions.

== United Way Worldwide ==
United Way organizations raise funds primarily via workplace campaigns, where employers may solicit contributions on United Way's behalf payable through automatic payroll deductions. After an administrative fee is deducted, funds raised locally by United Way are then distributed to various nonprofit agencies within those communities. Major recipients have included the American Cancer Society, Big Brothers/Big Sisters, Catholic Charities, Girl Scouts, Boy Scouts, and The Salvation Army.

Membership in United Way and use of the United Way brand is overseen by the United Way Worldwide umbrella organization. United Way Worldwide is not a top-down organization that has ownership of local United Ways. Instead, each local United Way is run as independently and incorporated separately as (if within the United States) a 501(c)(3) organization. Each affiliate is led by local staff and volunteers and have their own board of directors, independent of United Way Worldwide or a parent organization. Some United Way affiliates, like the Central Community Chest of Japan, choose not to use the United Way name and branding.

[We have] converted United Way from a federation of local charities to a franchise model. The local franchisees bring in donations, and the worldwide organization receives a percentage of revenue. We promote the brand, provide infrastructure, and guide the strategy.

— Brian Gallagher on United Way's structure

Local United Ways pay membership dues to United Way Worldwide for licensing rights to the United Way brand and must meet criteria to maintain their membership status (including independent review boards, audits, and restrictions on marketing tactics). The membership dues to United Way Worldwide are a portion of the total funds raised by each local United Way. U.S. affiliates pay a membership fee of 1% of their total funds raised to United Way Worldwide. The structure has been described as similar to a "global franchise operation" by Forbes magazine.

Internally, United Ways are classified by how much funds they raise on a scale of 10 levels. Metro 1 is the highest-ranking which requires raising at least $9 million annually.

== Functions ==
United Ways are federated fundraising bodies that mobilize a single fundraising campaign to raise money for a diverse range of nonprofits. United Ways raise funds and determine how to best distribute them.

=== Fundraising ===
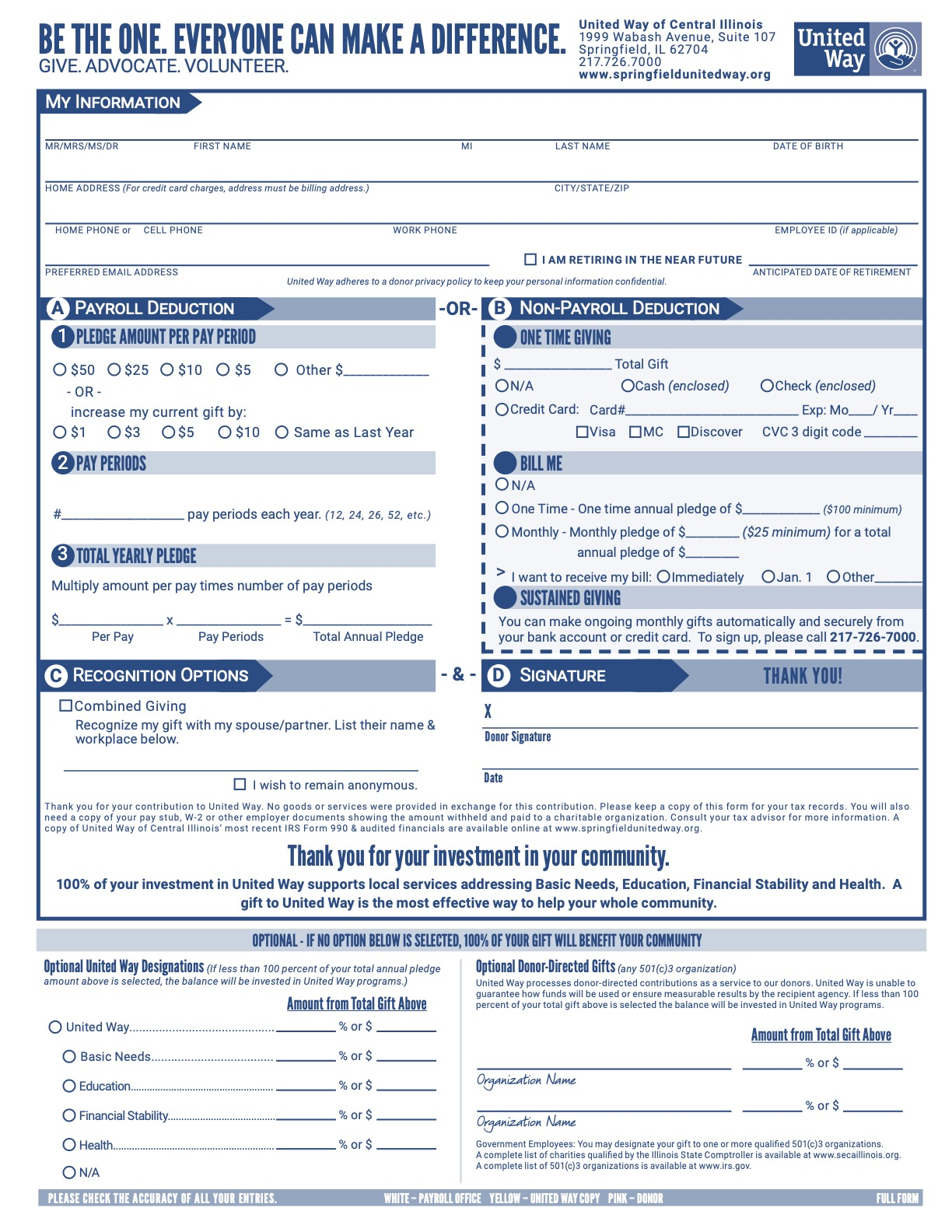
Example of a United Way pledge form where employees can choose how much to donate and where to designate their funds

United Ways raise funds primarily via company-sanctioned workplace campaigns, where the employer solicits contributions from their employees that can be paid through automatic payroll deductions (in the same way tax withholdings and insurance premiums are deducted from an employee's net pay). 57% of United Way's donations come through payroll deductions while an additional 20% from corporate donations.

United Way also administers many of the annual workplace campaigns for federal employees in the US called the Combined Federal Campaign.

Nonprofit agencies that partner with United Way usually agree not to fundraise while the United Way campaigns are underway.

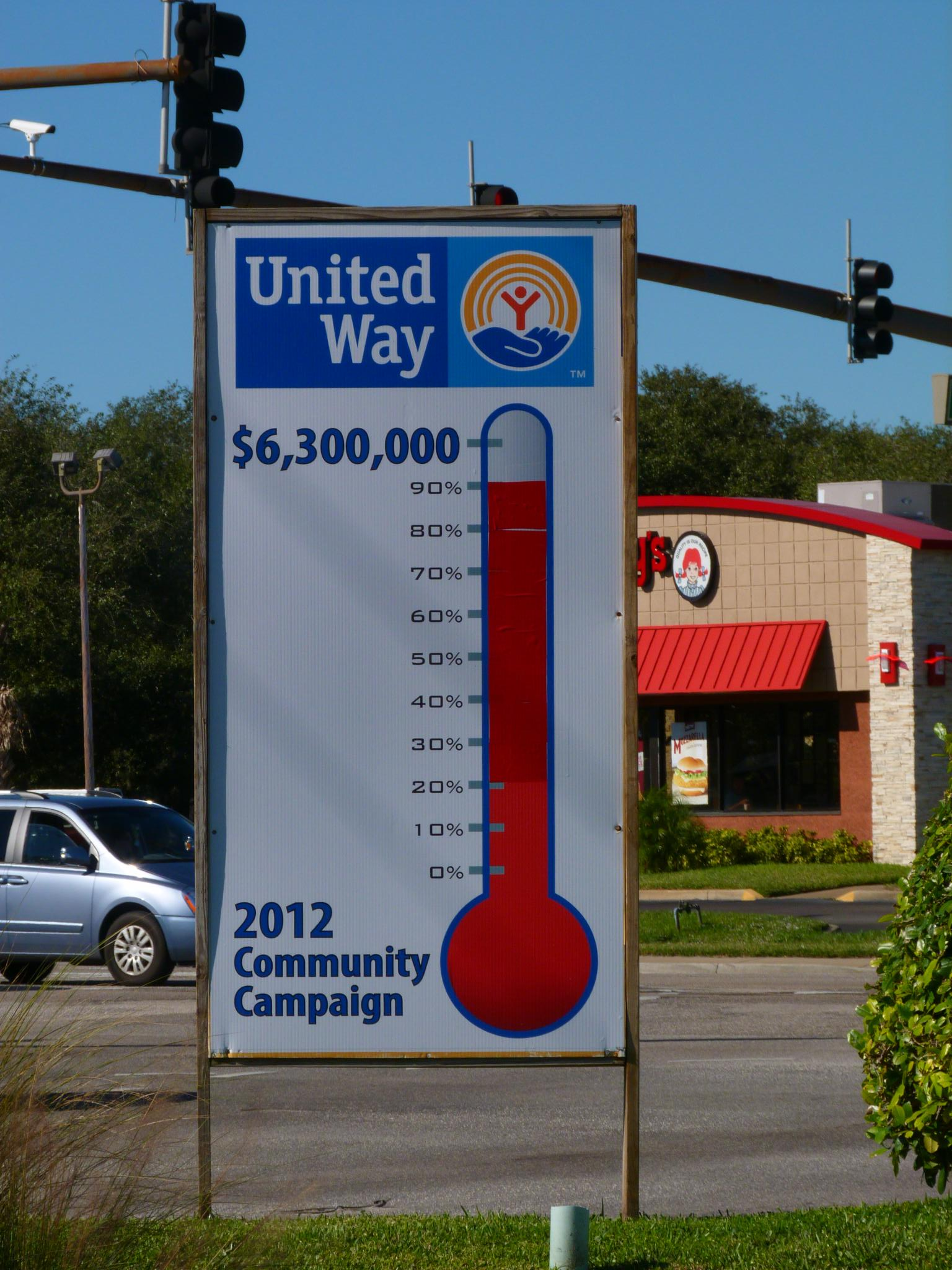
Local United Way fundraising thermometer poster

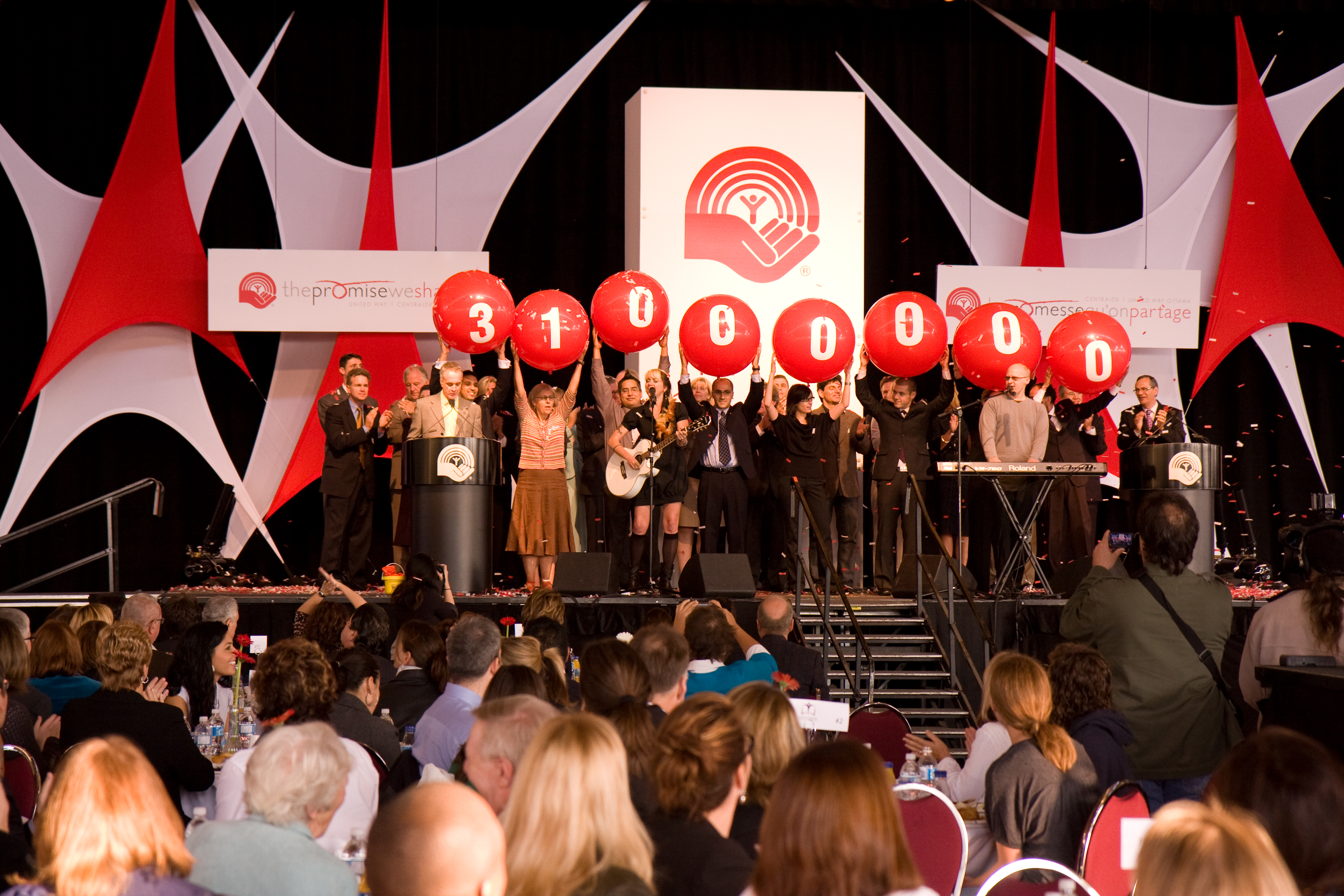
United Way of Canada's campaign kick-off event where the annual campaign goal of C$31 million is announced

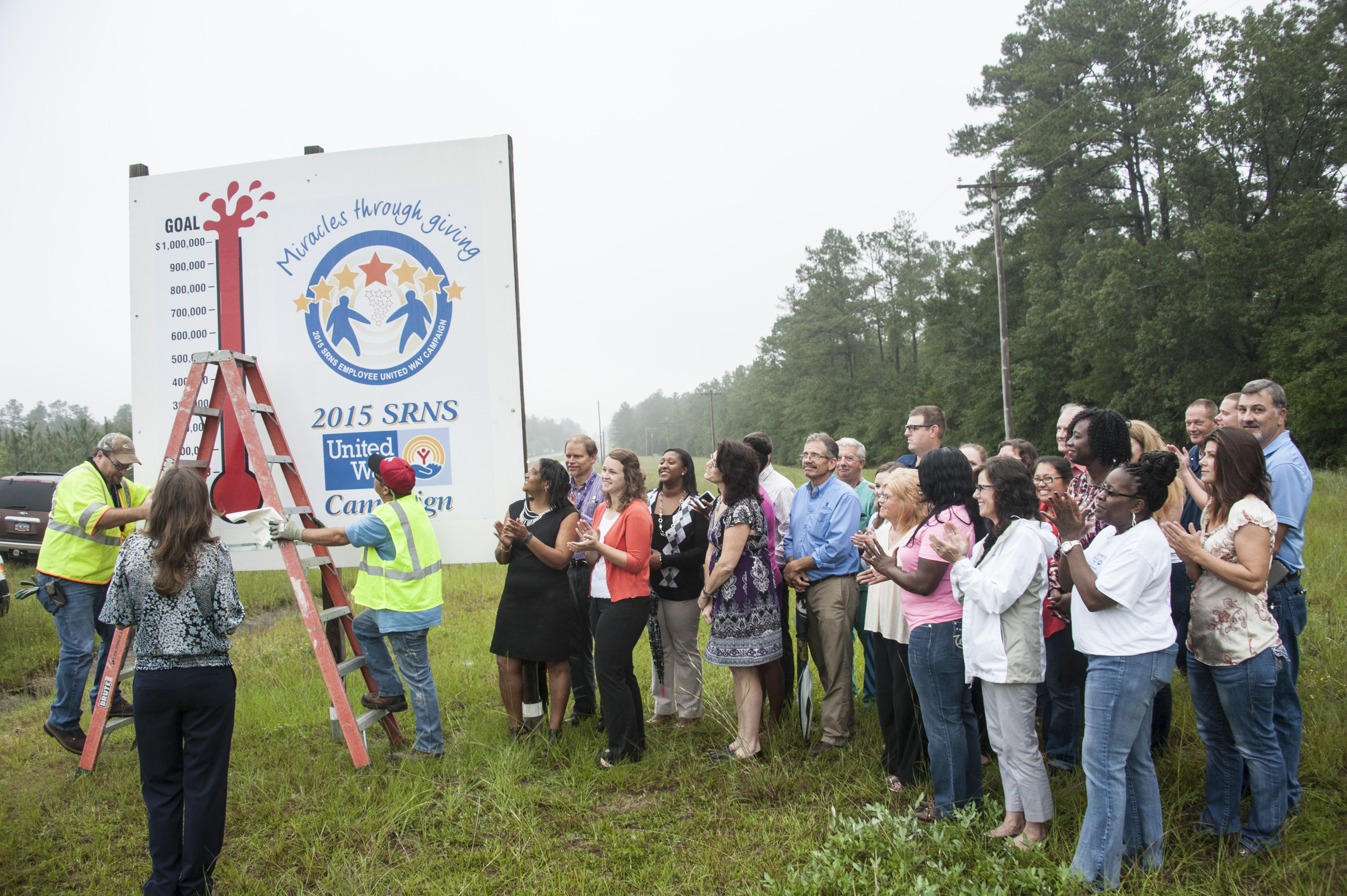
Savannah River Site employees reach United Way campaign goal in 2015

=== Distributing funds ===
Money raised by local United Ways is distributed to local nonprofit agencies after an administrative cost is deducted. In 2002, the average administrative fee was 12.7%. Where United Way distributes the funds depends on if the donor designated or restricted their donation to a specific organization or cause.

==== Designated donations (donor-choice) ====
Almost all United Ways allow donors to specify (designate) which nonprofits should receive their funds. Some United Ways let donors choose which focus area or social problems (like helping kids or the elderly) they wish to support, which allocates their gift to a relevant subset of their charities in its network. Some United Ways allow donors to direct their gifts to any nonprofit (either inside or outside United Way's preferred charity list) while some only let donors give to any charity in their region or anywhere in the country.

About a quarter of United Way donations in the US are currently designated.

==== Undesignated donations ====
If the donor does not earmark a specific cause or organization for their donation, the money goes into a general fund and are allocated to areas of greatest need by the local United Way's volunteer committee.

Traditionally, United Ways would grant funds that can be used for any purpose by the recipient nonprofit. However, many United Ways have started giving funds to nonprofits only to be used for specific programs run by the nonprofit (e.g. a workforce training program at the local chapter of St Vincent de Paul). These funds are provided in the form of contracts in which the nonprofit must deliver programs and are subject to review and audit by the United Way's volunteer committee.

== History ==
=== Origins in the Community Chest movement ===
Community Chest appeals
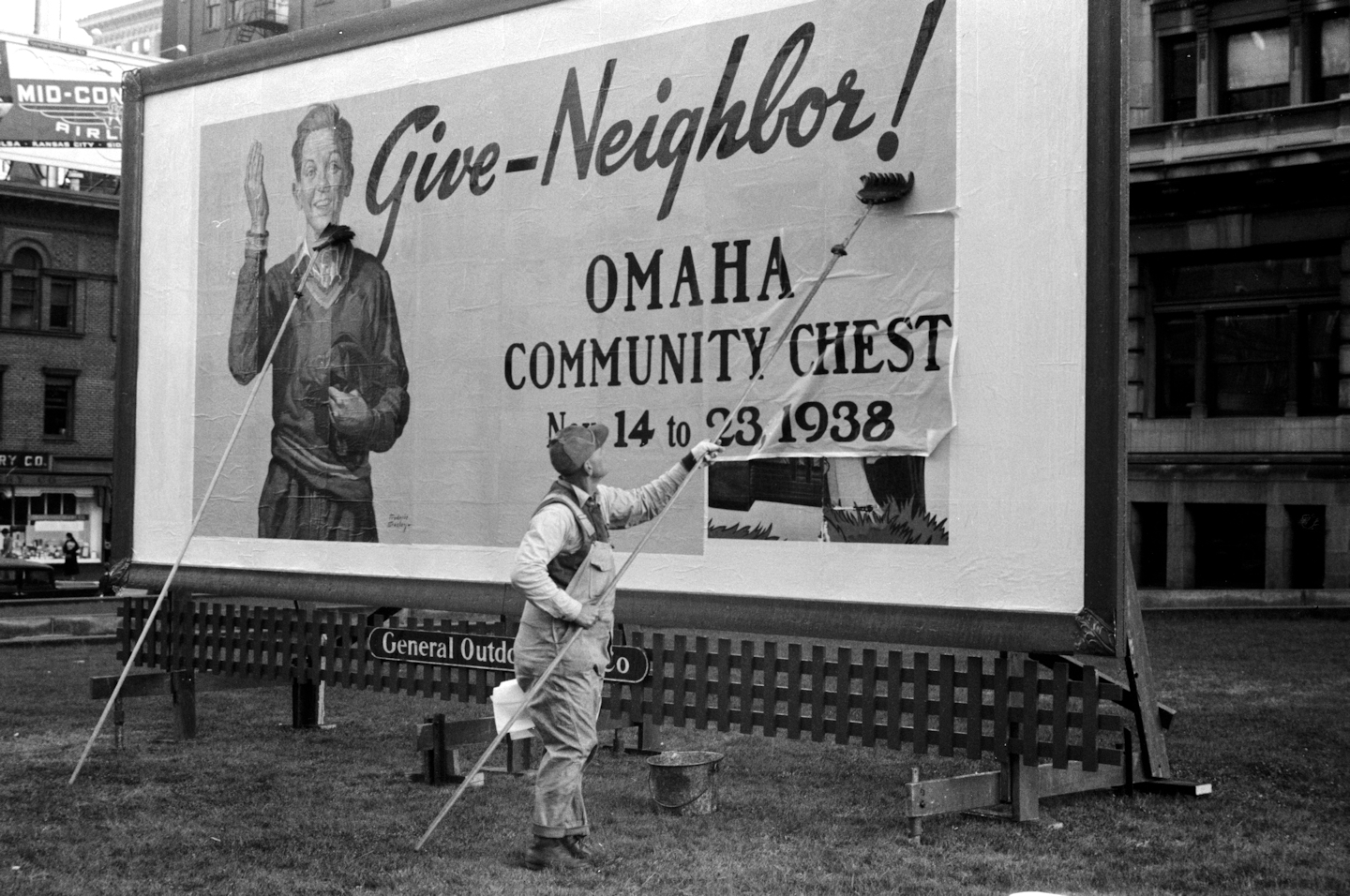
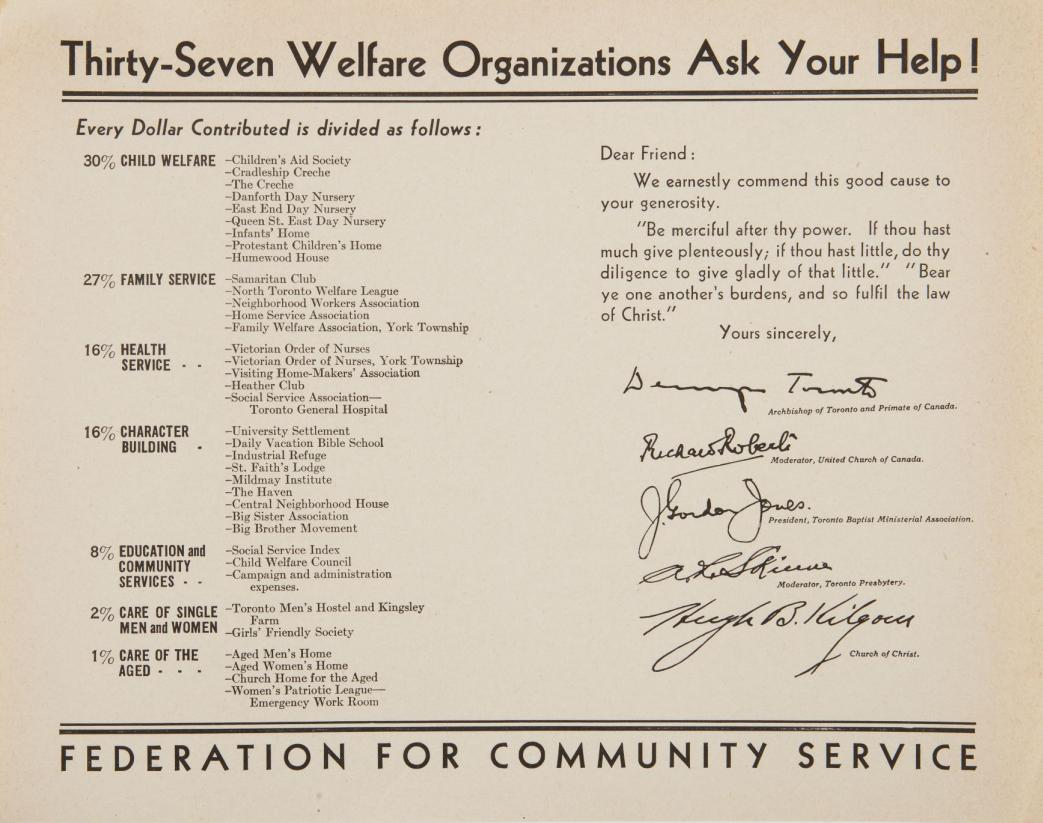
Left: Man lays billboard advertisement for the Omaha Community Chest in 1938.
Right: An appeal published by the Federation for Community Service in Toronto, Canada (a predecessor of United Way of Canada)

The organization has roots in Denver, Colorado, where in 1887 Frances Wisebart Jacobs, along with the Rev. Myron W. Reed, Msgr. William J. O'Ryan, Dean H. Martyn Hart and Rabbi William S. Friedman began the Charity Organization Society, which coordinated services between Jewish and Christian charities and fundraising for 22 agencies. Many Community Chest organizations, which were founded in the first half of the twentieth century to jointly collect and allocate money, joined the American Association for Community Organizations in 1918.

The first Community Chest was founded in 1913 in Cleveland, Ohio, after the example of the Jewish Federation in Cleveland—which served as an exemplary model for "federated giving".

Posters supporting WWI war funds
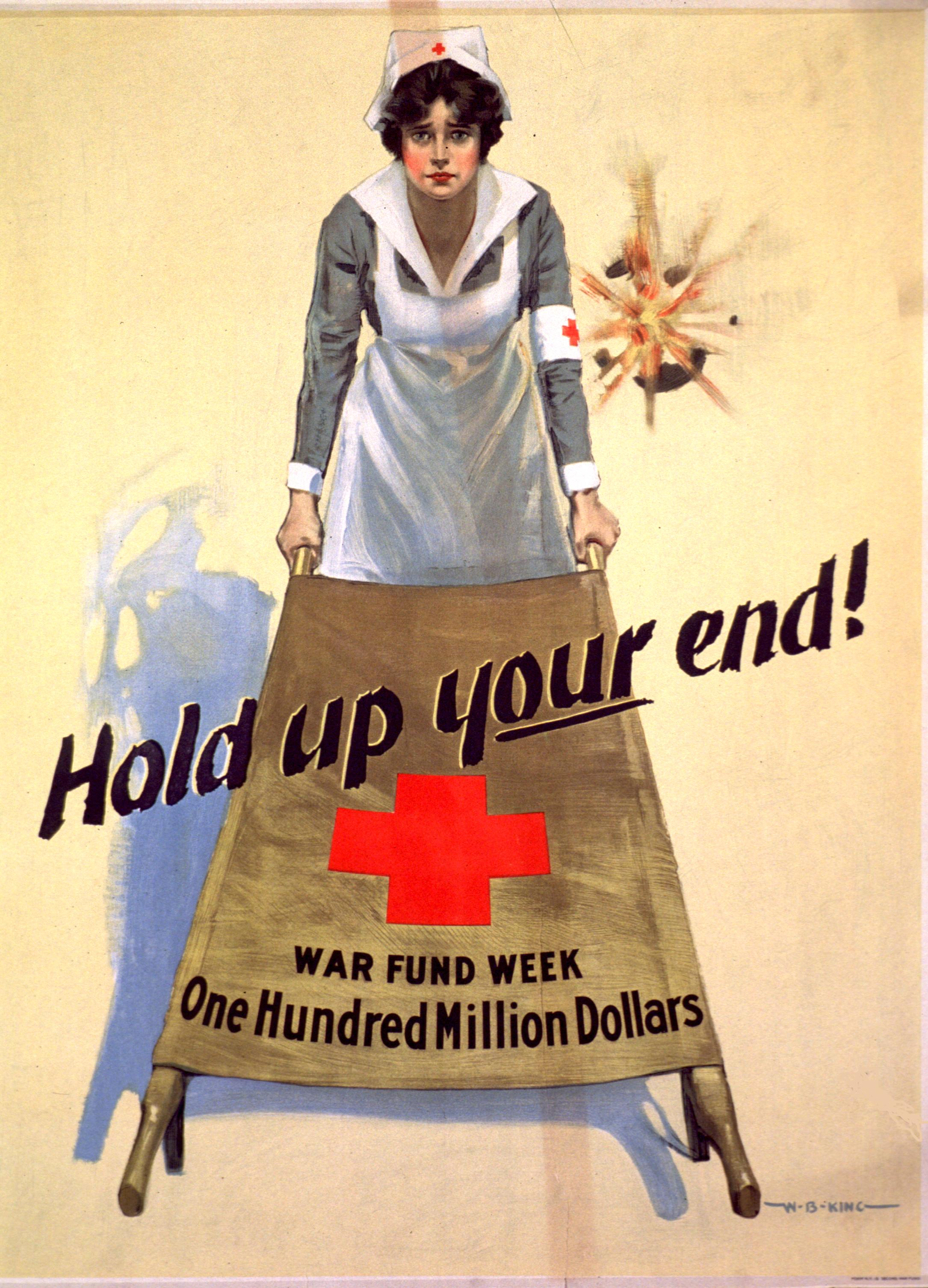
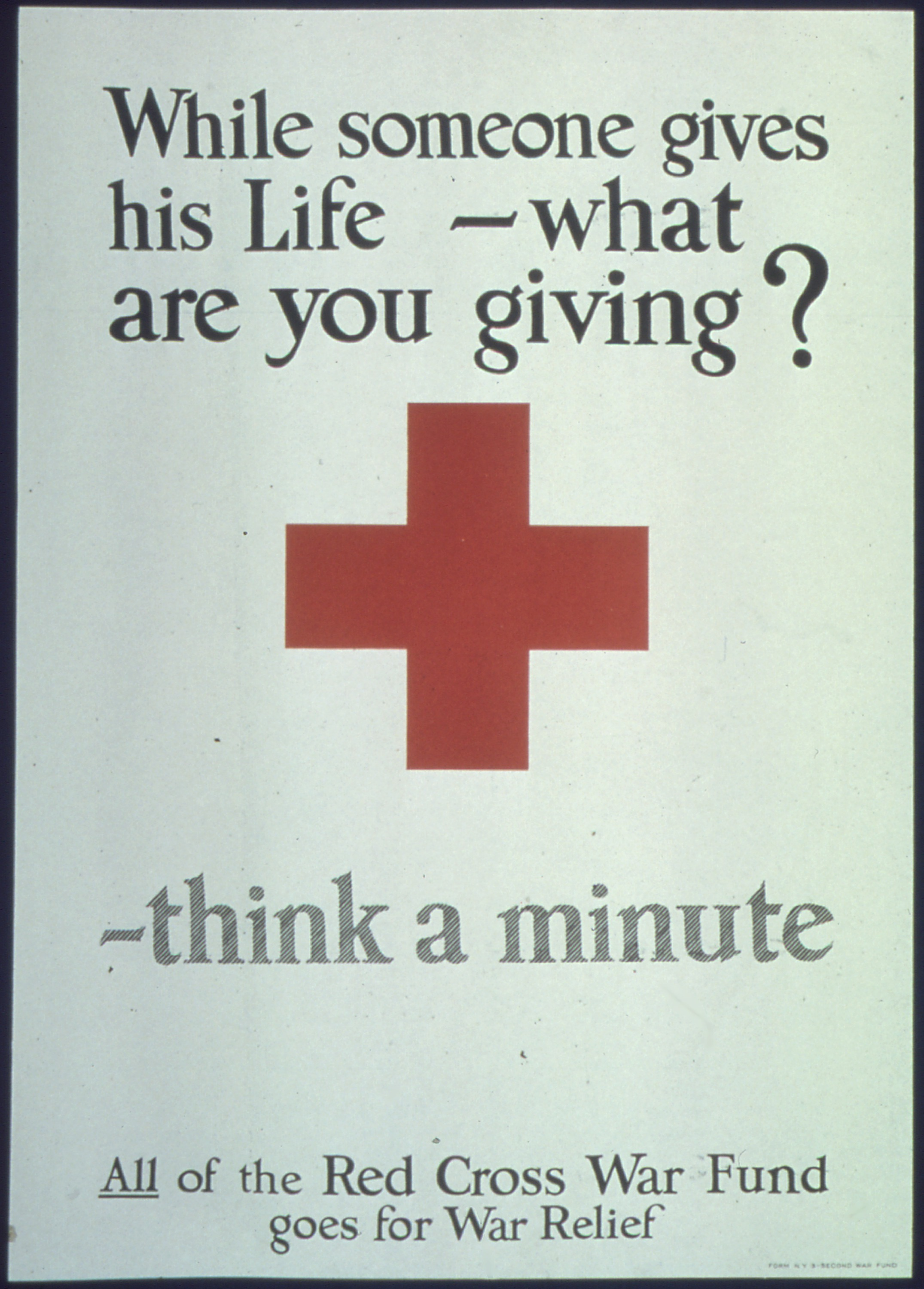
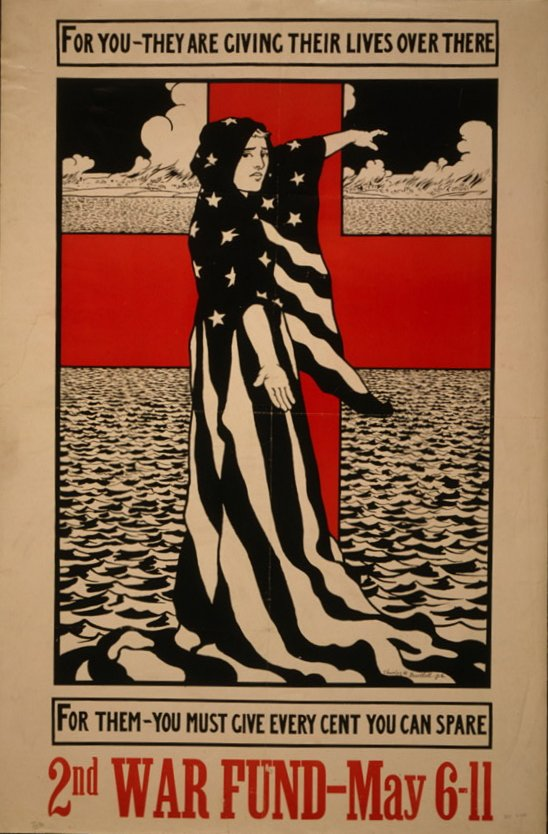

The success of the Cleveland Community Chest led to a modest spread of the concept to other cities. World War I helped disseminate the concept of the Community Chest as the model for federating giving was used to support wartime fundraising efforts. Of the 300–400 War Chests that existed during the war, most converted over to becoming Community Chests after the war ended.

The number of Community Chest organizations quickly increased from 245 in 1925 to almost 800 by 1945. An observer on WWI's effects on the movement said, "there is no doubt that the federation movement gained a momentum in one year that would have required ten years of peacetime activity." Mirroring the changing terminology, the American Association for Community Organization changed its name to the Community Chests and Councils, Inc in 1927.

Posters supporting WWII war funds
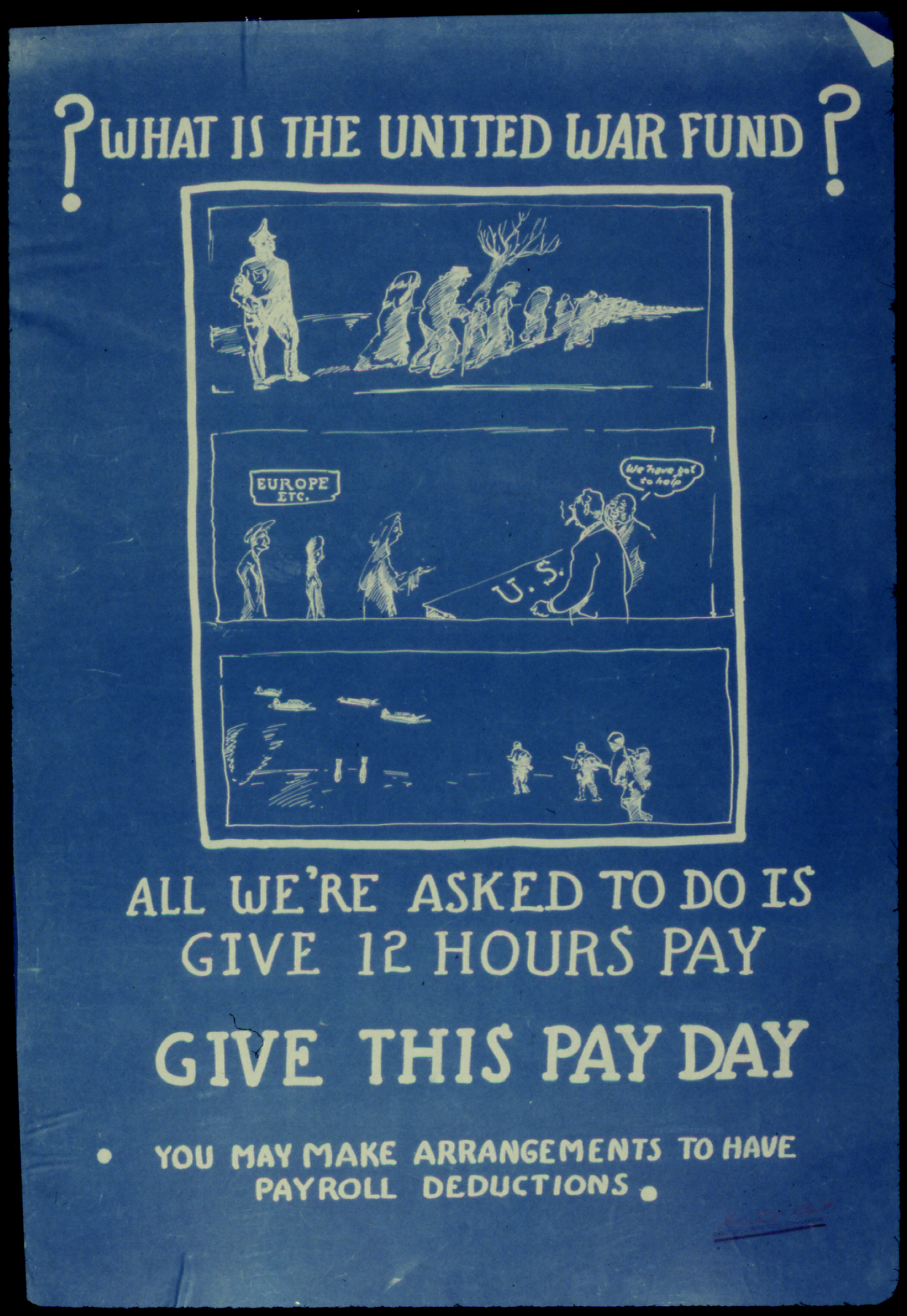
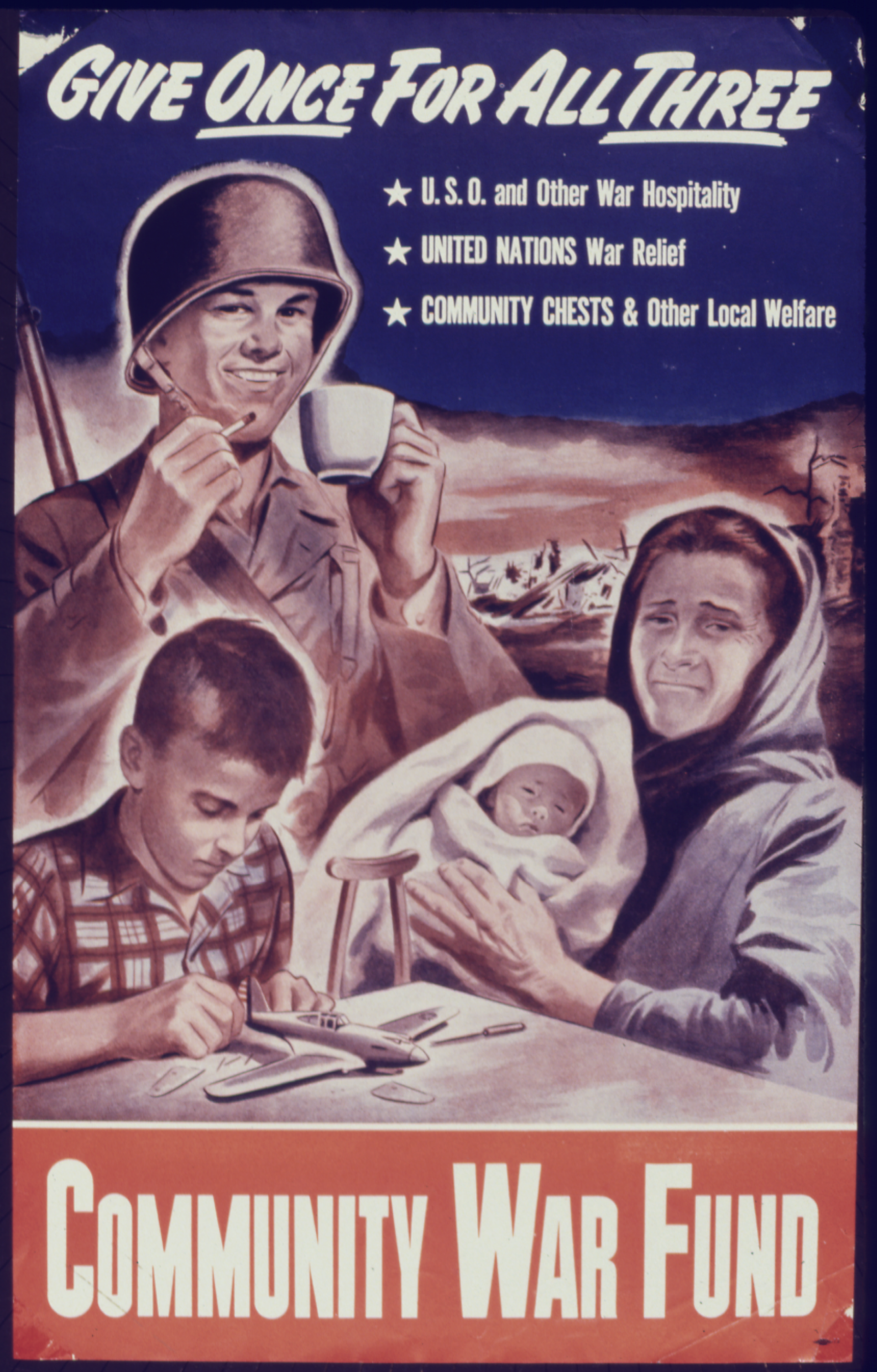
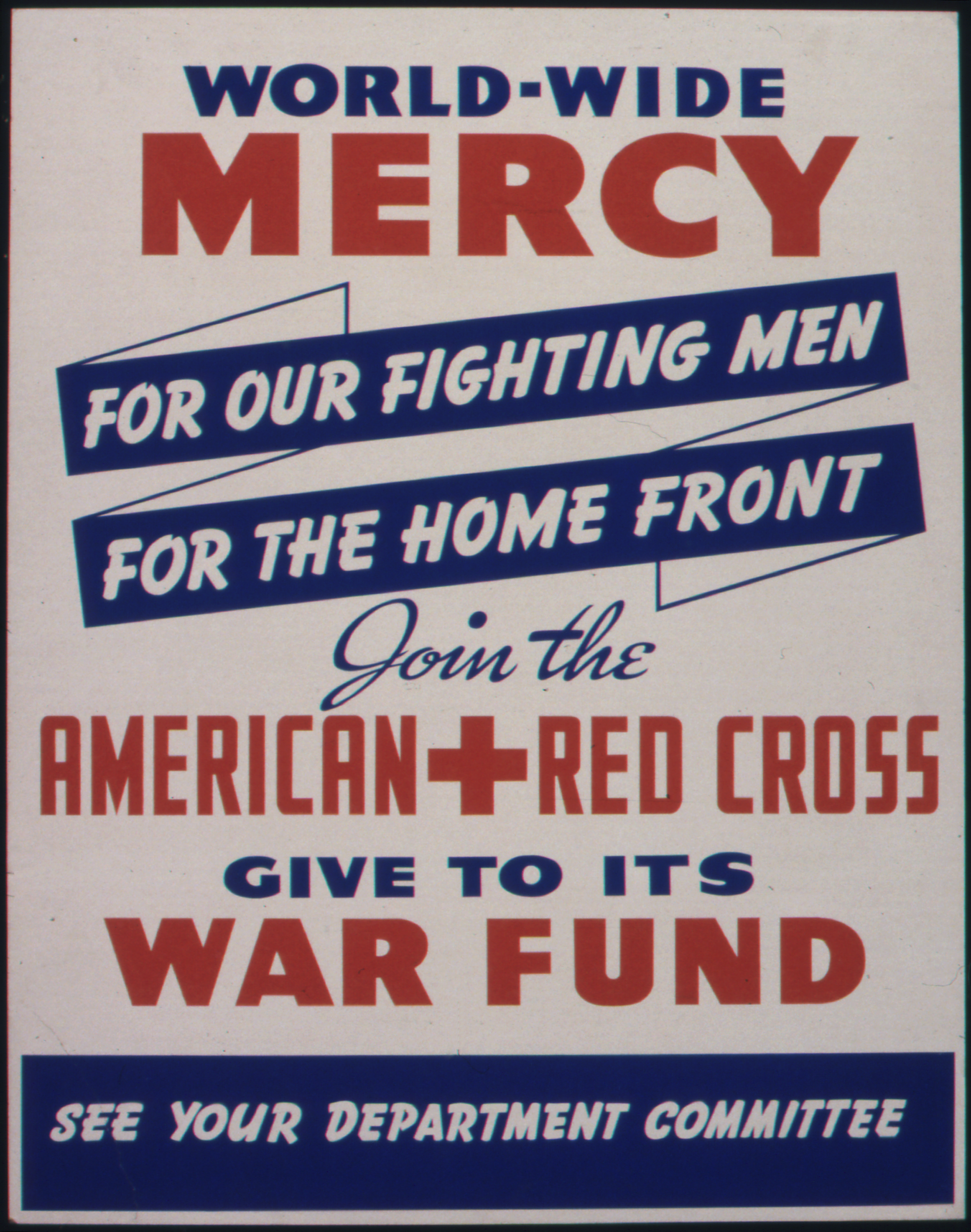
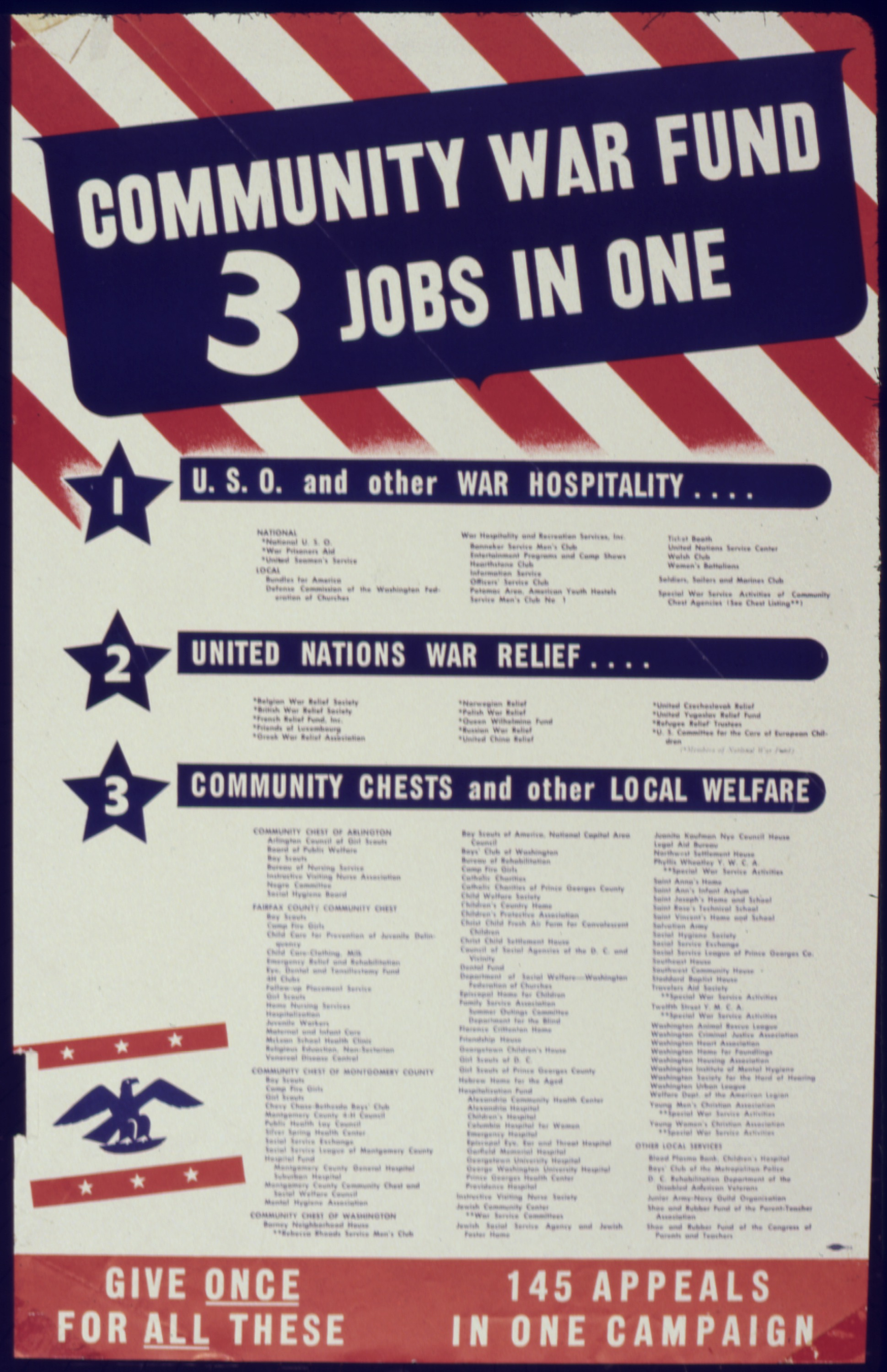
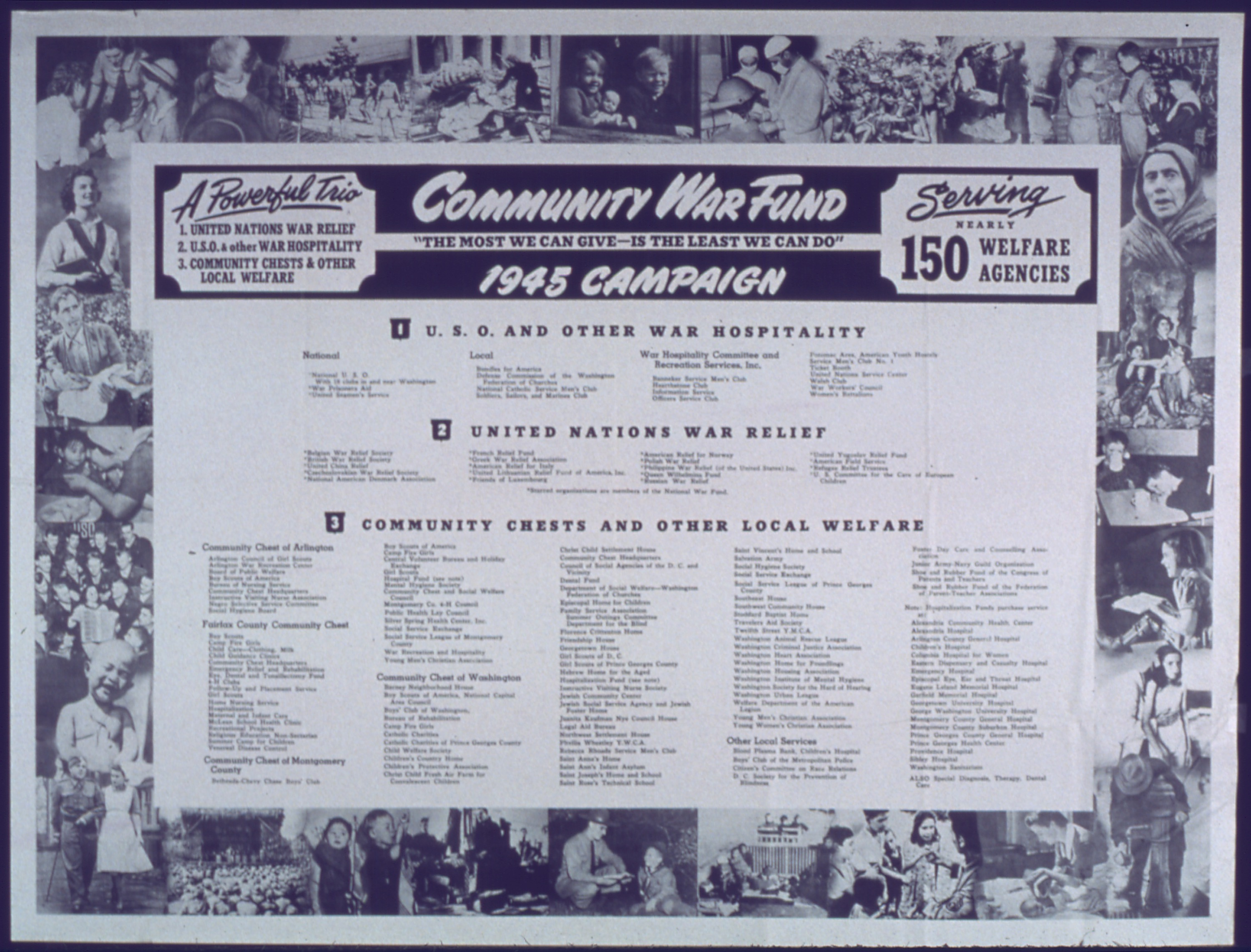

=== Further consolidation into United Funds ===
World War II also impacted the Community Chest movement. National health research charities, like the American Red Cross and the American Cancer Society, gained government support during the war. These health agencies used their centralized headquarters and nationwide fundraising reach to run separate and competing local fundraising campaigns alongside the Community Chests.

Propaganda film promoting the United Foundation of Metropolitan Detroit

The competing appeals between the health organizations and Community Chests resulted in exhausting and disorganized situations. Business leaders were concerned that the barrage of donation drives in the workplace would reduce productivity. The Ford Company issued a well-publicized press release stating that the automaker lost $40,000 in executive time and employee productivity with each plant solicitation. A committee at Ford led by Henry Ford II told charities to "federate or perish. We'll contribute to charity once a year or not at all."

Last year in Detroit there were no fewer than 50 charity drives in addition to the Community Chest. This year Detroiters reconsolidated with a will. They lumped together all of the Chest's 125 component agencies, plus 18 others, as beneficiaries of a single United Foundation "Torch" Drive.

— Life magazine, November 14, 1949

This outgrowth of objections from business and labor leaders led to the formation of the first United Fund in 1949 in Detroit, Michigan. Under the motto of "Give Once for All", the United Foundation hosted a single campaign that included Community Chests, local charities, and some of the national charities. This first campaign in Detroit was a success and had raised more in the single campaign than the disparate efforts has yielded the year prior. The single workplace campaign model quick spread elsewhere and, by 1953, there were over 1,200 United Funds.

These campaigns, which united Community Chests with other organizations, commonly used the "United" prefix in their names. In 1956, Community Chests and Councils, Inc. changed its name again to United Community Funds and Councils of America (UCFCA) to reflect the shifting naming used by its affiliates.

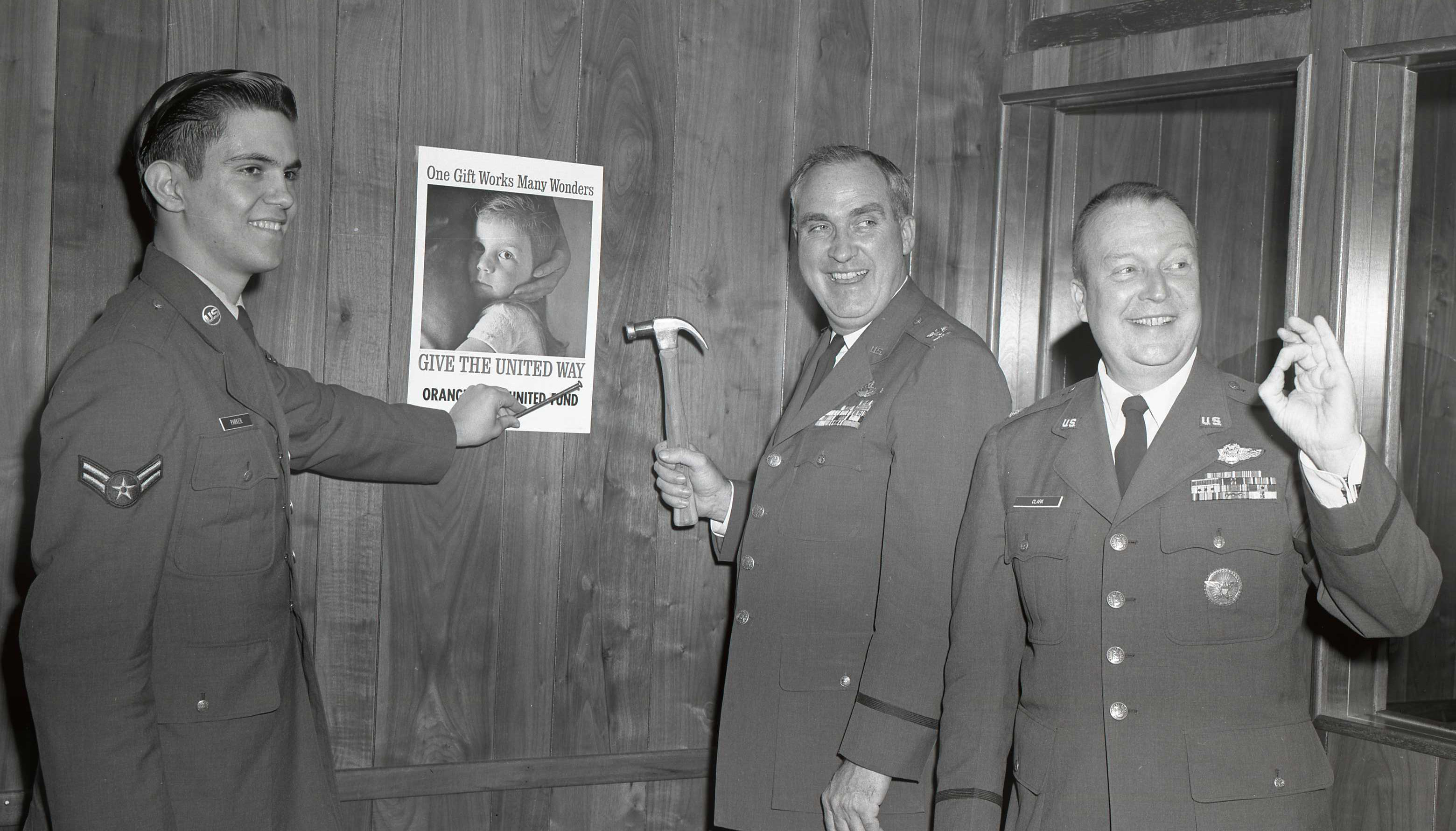
Men hanging a campaign poster for a United Fund in 1966

The "big three" national health drives (the American Cancer Society, the National Foundation for Infantile Paralysis, and the American Red Cross) objected to handing over control of their fundraising efforts and refused to participate in a single workplace drive. The focus of local community fundraising also conflicted with the mission of the national health organizations. Many United Funds supported health causes locally, with funds going to charities in their local communities. By the late 1960s, the conflicts between United Funds and national health charities resolved itself with many of the charities folding into the United Fund or retreating from competing.

=== Formation of the United Way ===
After WWII, the United Fund took a similar role to the modern United Way. They focused almost exclusively on workplace fundraising (rather than the Community Chests' focus on door-to-door solicitations). The end of the excess profit taxes weakened the incentives for corporate gifts after World War II. Campaign leaders looked to employees in workplace (and not their bosses) as an opportunity to make up for the expected loss. In 1956, workplace giving from employees accounted for 39.6% of the revenue of United Funds and Community Chests. This was the first time that workplace giving exceeded corporate gifts (38%). With federal government's move to allow compulsory Social Security and income tax withholdings in 1942, the technology of payroll deductions became a vehicle to allow employees to give incremental gifts. The strong economy in post-war economic boom helped these campaigns to grow at a rate of 5–10% annually. United Community Funds and Council of America, the national association of United Funds, expanded its role in the 1970s. Historically, it served a similar role as a trade association to the United Funds and lacked authority in shaping their affiliates. Its thousands of affiliates went by no fewer than 137 different names and pursued thousands of different charitable objectives.

The original United Way logo by Saul Bass (1972)

I think that the sun‐like rainbow growing out of the hand is open to many alternate positive interpretations. One may say it's the hand of the United Way bringing hope to people. But it helps signal that United Way is vibrant, exciting, colorful, positive and changing.

— Saul Bass on designing the logo

To give the organization a national identity, the United Community Funds and Council of America adopted a new name and logo. The organization announced on July 13, 1970, that it would change its name from "United Funds and Council of America" to United Way of America. Bayard Ewing, the president of the fund said: "We wanted a simple name that would give people a clearer and more descriptive idea of what our organization is trying to do. I hope that the name will be adopted by all of our 2,260 fund‐raising units throughout the country." The new logo was designed by graphic designer Saul Bass in 1972. Aramony traveled to major cities to persuade the affiliates to adopt the logo and brand name.

It moved from New York City to Alexandria, Virginia, in 1971.

In 1973, United Way of America formed a partnership with the National Football League.

By 1974, there were enough United Way organizations internationally to demand the kind of support provided by the national organization, United Way of America, and United Way International was born. Its staff spoke eight languages, with a Board of Directors from more than seven countries working with member organizations. Christopher Amundsen served as interim president during a yearlong search.

=== Competing with alternative funds ===
United Way in the Community
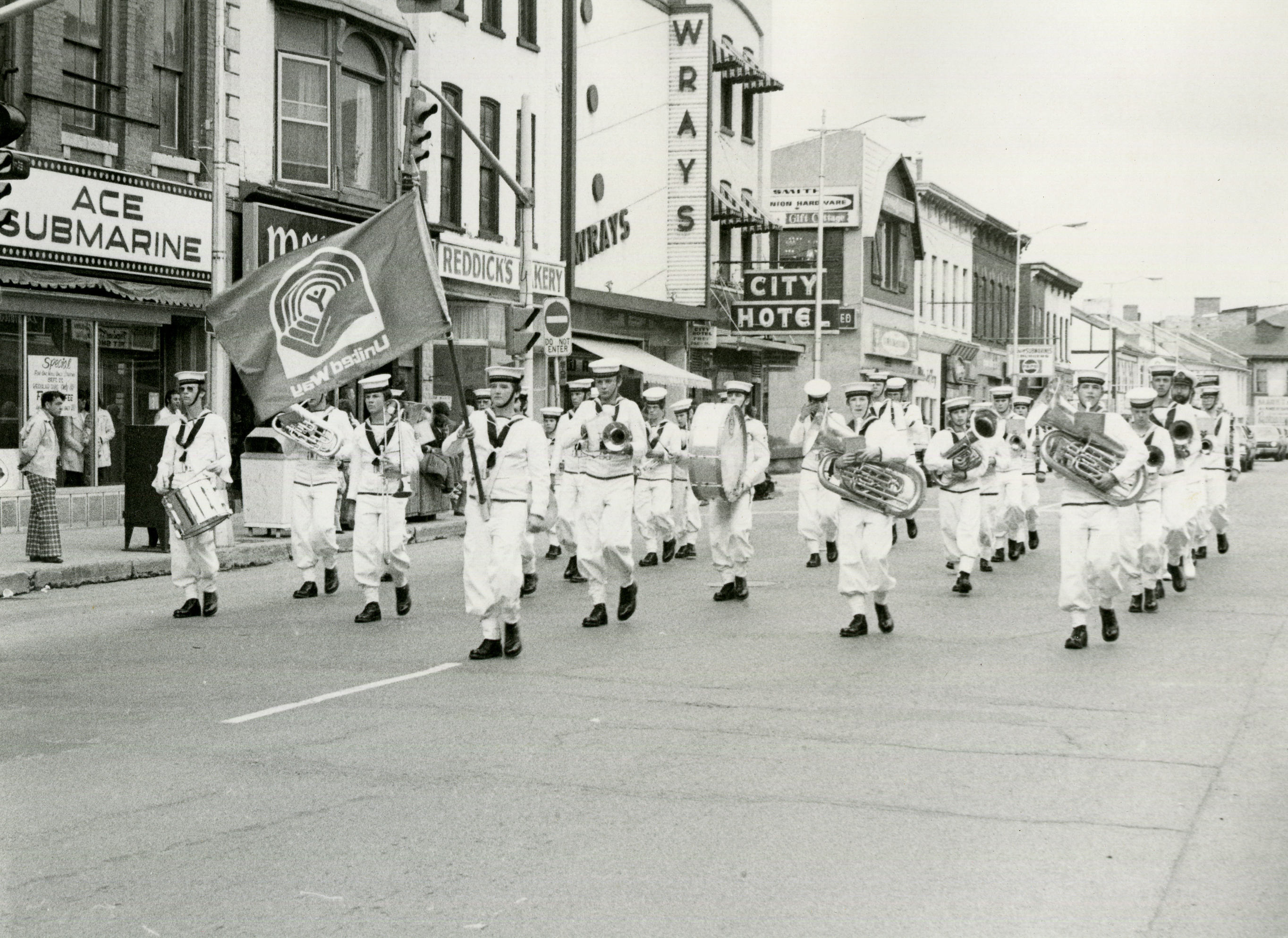
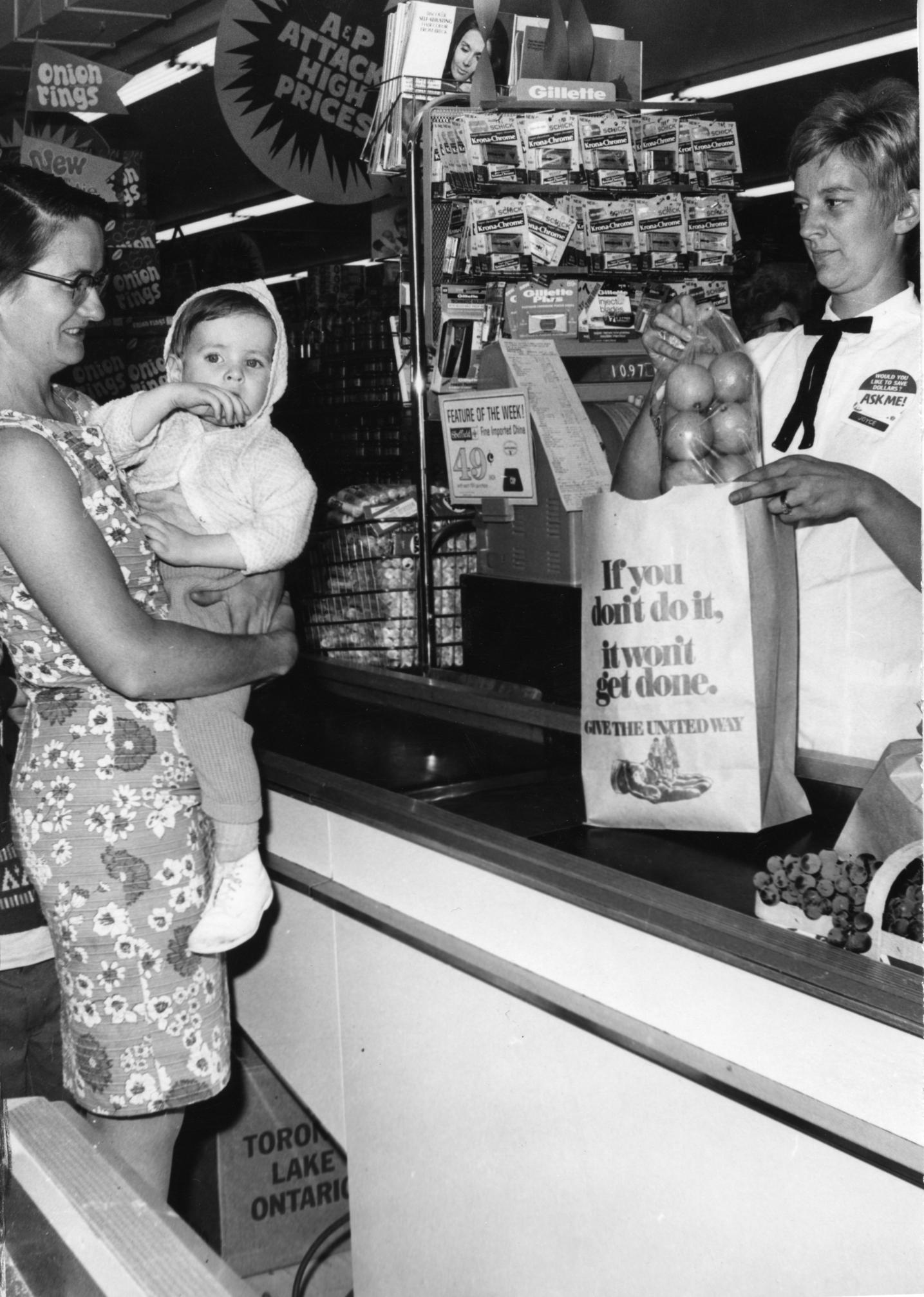
Top: Canadian sea cadet waves a United Way flag, circa 1977.
Bottom: United Way appeal on a paper grocery bag. The message reads, "If you don't do it, it won't get done. Give the United Way."

United Way faced competition from competing federations (called "alternative funds") that focused on a narrower set of issues that resonate strongly with donors, including championing controversial issues have excluded from United Way funding or that do not appeal to United Way's predominantly male, white, corporate membership. These alternative funds challenged the central thesis of the United Way model – that one umbrella organization can serve both the donors' interests and community's needs. The competition for access to the workplace giving was called the "Charity War" among professional fundraisers at the time.

Some United Ways fought against the additions to alternative funds out of fear that nonprofits will suffer when faced with competition and that the multiple donation appeals would cause confusion. United Way of Los Angeles President Leo Cornelius said of alternative funds for a 1989 Los Angeles Times article, "There should be one campaign at the workplace, for the donor's sake. Otherwise, it's like watching four or five or 15 TV screens at one time." In one case, a delegation from the Bay Area United Way phoned the chairman of the Safeway supermarket chain to lobby against the addition alternative funds in their workplace campaigns in 1988. Apple Inc. was the first Fortune 500 company to allow a federation other than United Way into its workplace.

Private workplaces began to open access to non-United Way workplace campaigns in the mid-1990s, with the trend growing throughout the next decade. Four federations (America's Charities, Community Health Charities, EarthShare, and Global Impact) formed the Charities@Work coalition promoted expanding access to workplace campaigns. Due to the competitive philanthropic environment, United Ways has lost market share. In 1988, there were 450,000 nonprofits in US and United Way share's of US charitable contributions was 3.16%; by 1999, there were 715,000 nonprofits, and the United Way's share decreased to only 1.98% of donations. The trend of alternative funds continues to today with only 25 percent of the companies conducting a traditional United Way–only campaign (according to a 2009 survey by the Consulting Network).

=== The Aramony scandal and its aftermath ===
In January 1990, an anonymous tipster sent a note on United Way of America letterhead to several United Way directors, including the board chairman Edward A. Brennan, alleging that United Way of America CEO William Aramony had affairs with two sisters (one of which was a teenager) and he was using the charity's money to keep the women quiet. Aramony denied the allegations to Brennen. After UWA's board reviewed and concluded that the letter's allegations had no basis in March 1990, the matter was dropped.

It was later found that Aramony used the company's dollars to fund luxurious expenses, including flights on a Concorde and $90,000 for his limousine service. Aramony had spun off two for-profit enterprises using United Way of America funds, the Partnership Umbrella and Sales Service/America. The suspicious set up raised questions if the companies, which were designed to offer bulk discounts and other cost-savings to local United Ways, were actually being used for Aramony's personal enrichment. Partnership Umbrella had used United Way of America funds to purchase and decorate $1.2 million of real estate in Alexandria, Miami and New York, including a $459,000 condo in New York City for Aramony.

In December 1991, an outside firm was hired to conduct the investigation into the allegations. A lawyer concluded that there had been "sloppy record-keeping" and "inattention to detail" but avoided any specific admission of wrongdoing in the preliminary investigation.

Aramony, who was due to retire in July 1993, submitted his resignation on February 27, 1992, during a teleconference with local United Ways. Aramony said he was retiring "to put things back in proper focus ... because media attention is overshadowing the importance of the work of United Way and the countless accomplishments we have made together." In April 1995, Aramony was convicted on 23 counts of felony charges, including conspiracy, fraud and filing false tax returns. He was sentenced to seven years in prison and served six years. Two associates, Thomas J. Merlo and Stephen J. Paulachak, were also convicted and sentenced to prison.

In the aftermath of the William Aramony scandal, local United Ways boycotted United Way of America by refusing to make their dues payments to the umbrella organization. Representatives from 13 of the US's largest local United Ways told the interim President Kenneth Dam that they would like to see United Way of America half its current size. Of the 1,400 local United Ways, only 532 were paying some or all of their dues in 1992. To account for the lost revenue at United Way of America, employees were offered two months of added severance pay (in addition to the standard severance pay based on years of service) if they chose to resign, employees who stayed were offered up to four weeks off of furlough time, and all salary increases were halted.

IBM vice president Kenneth W. Dam was named interim CEO after Aramony's departure in 1992. Elaine Chao was selected as president after Dam and stayed on until 1996.

=== Beene's centralization efforts ===
Betty Stanley Beene took over in 1997. Beene advocated for a more-centralized system where United Way of America would take the lead on issues that affect all local United Ways and attempted to set national standards for all United Ways. This proposal would require that each local United Way undergo a thorough public self-examination of their effectiveness every few years.

United Way of America, under Beene leadership, paid Cap Gemini America $12 million to build charitable-pledge software for the United Way Information Network, a centralized national pledge processing center. The national center aimed to make donations more efficient and attractive to companies with national footprints. However, these plans competed with the regional pledge processing centers operated by four large regional United Ways. The software was riddled with issues and was unable to process gifts in its first test run. A review of the software by Deloitte & Touche found 400 serious problems. United Way abandoned the project in 1999 and came to settlement with Cap Gemini in 2000.

Some local United Ways intensely rejected these plans, and withheld their dues to United Way of America as an act of protest. The United Way in Rochester went so far as to obtain the legal right to alternative names in the event the United Way broke up. These issues would, in part, lead to Beene's departure in 2001.

Brian Gallagher, former head of United Way in Columbus, Ohio, took over as president and CEO in 2002.

=== Allowing donor-choice ===
United Way officially embraced a policy of donor designation in 1982, allowing donors to select which nonprofit organizations would receive their gift. Aramony first introduced the donor choice concept to prevent large employers from allowing alternative funds to solicit alongside United Way. However, United Ways resisted donation designations and the roll out of the new policy was described as a "glacial pace" in a 2000 piece in Fortune. Despite the slow rollout of donor-choice policies, dollars going to designations continued to grow over time. In 1990, only 14% of gifts went to outside charities. In 1999, United Way of America estimated that nearly 20% went to outside charities.

Allowing donor-choice caused donations to United Ways' general funds to decline. "Sometimes I think we kid ourselves into thinking that by creating more choice we raise more money. That's just not proven out," Gallagher said of donor-choice, "I think we somewhat dilute our giving if we're dividing our giving among thousands of agencies." In one case, the growth of amount of donor-choice contributed to the near-bankruptcy of United Way of Santa Clara County as the organization continued allocated the same amount year after year as their general fund pool shunk.

Kevin Ronnie of the National Committee for Responsive Philanthropy said of United Way's predicament to allow designations, "If they want to be the workplace campaign ... they have to offer choice because that's what people want. But, gosh darn it, if you offer choice, people will do it, and that comes at the expense of what the United Way also wants to be – the community caretaker." Some United Way has focused efforts on marketing the benefits of their undesignated funds in to attempt to persuade donors away from donor designations.

To combat the image of the declining funds in United Ways' control, United Way counted designated funds as dollars raised by United Way, even though the money could not be allocated by United Way. The practice written about in Eleanor Brilliant 1990 book on United Way: "...whether or not the money passed through the United Way allocations process seemed to be less important than making the largest nationwide counting of monies raised in the campaign. Undoubtedly, initially corporations were not concerned about this reporting system (and) had been making every effort to keep up both the reality and the façade of increased philanthropic dollars." These accounting practices would gain attention in 2002.

=== Creation of 2-1-1 ===
The United Way of Atlanta created the first 2-1-1 service in 1997. The Atlanta information and referral service was conceived to help navigate people to find the best programs for their need (e.g. homeless shelters, tax preparation, after-school programs, rent assistance, etc.). In 1998, United Way of America and the Alliance of Information and Referral Services petitioned the FCC to reserve the 211 three-digit dialing code for community information and referral services. In 2000, the FCC granted the petition and left it to the states to designate who should operate 211 services in their regions.

The program spread and in 2005 all or part of 32 states and Washington, D.C., had access to 211, reaching almost half the nation's population.

=== New community Impact model ===
United Way today
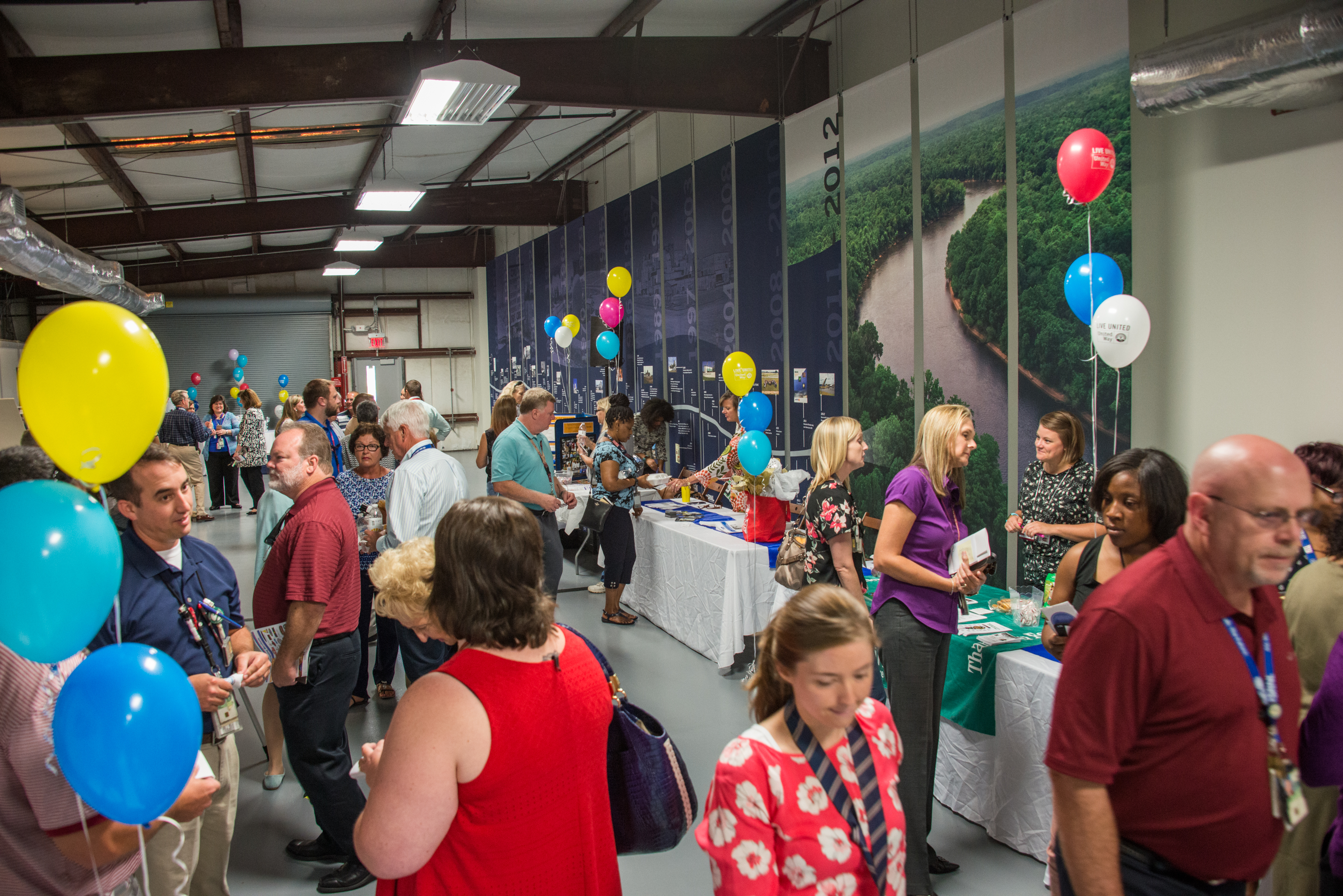
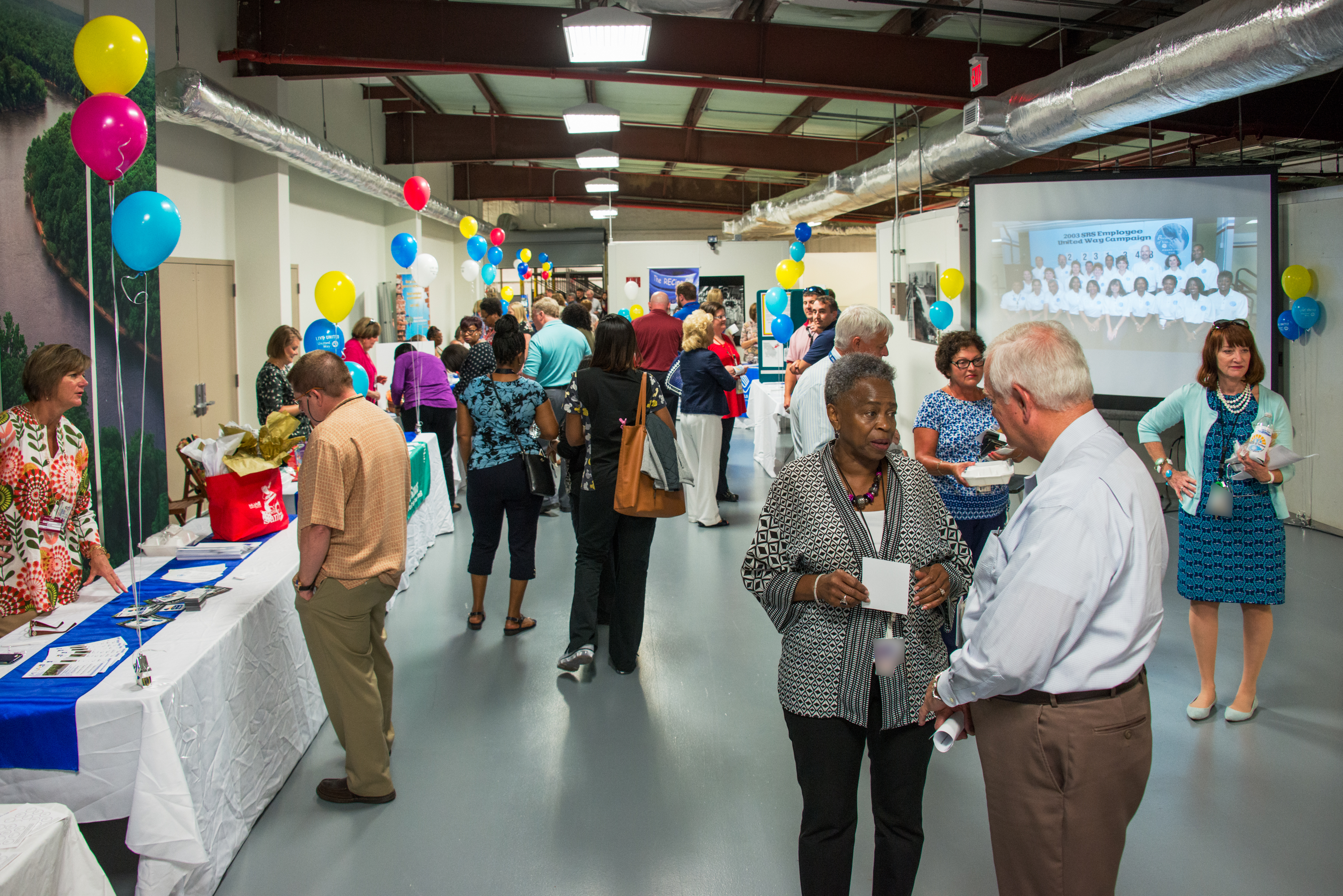
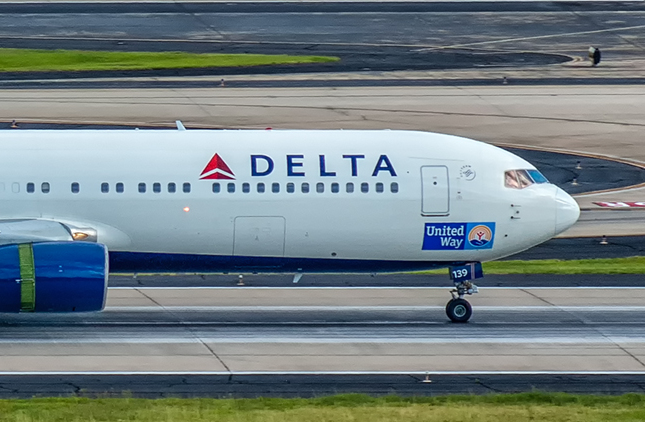
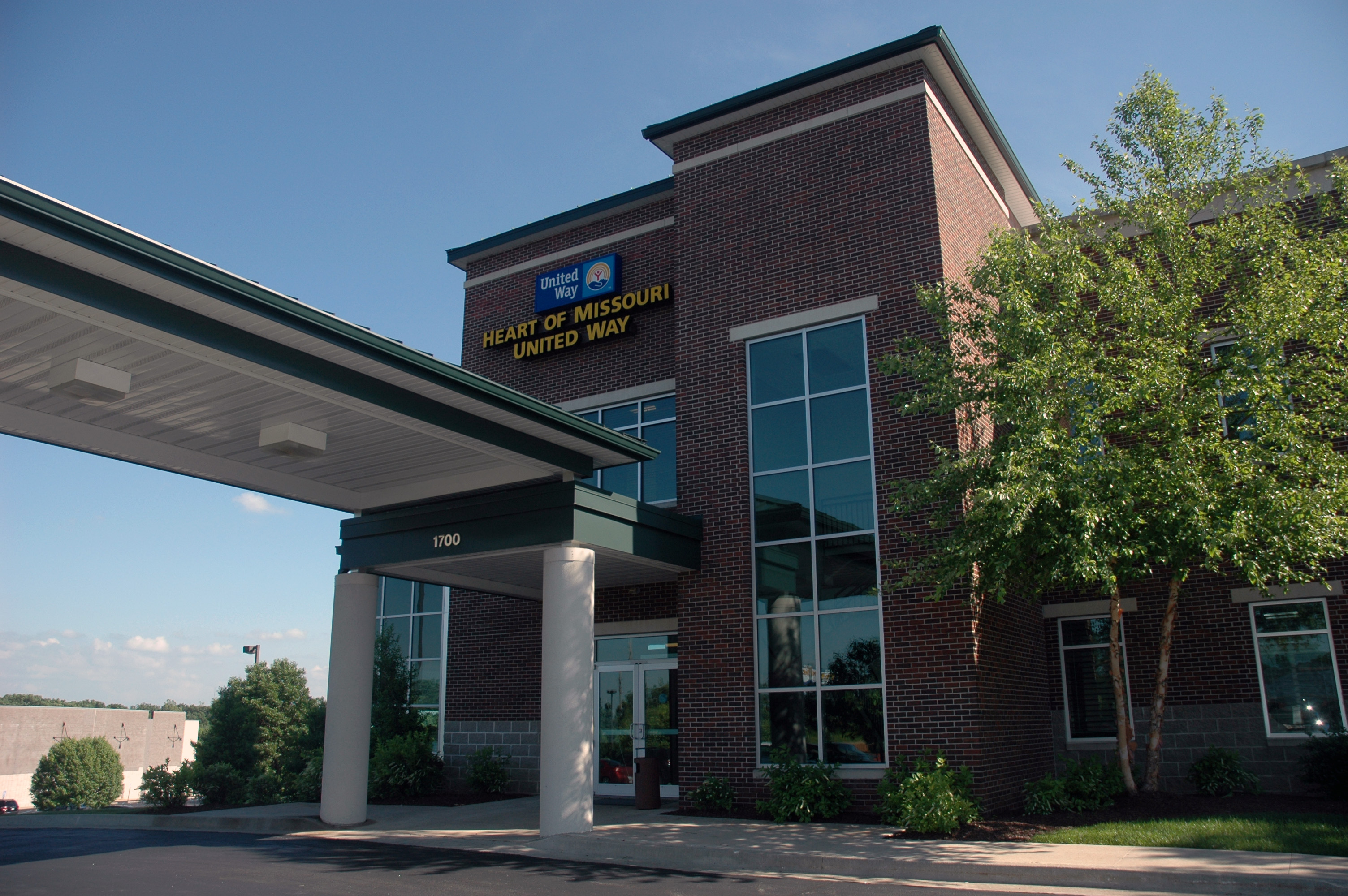
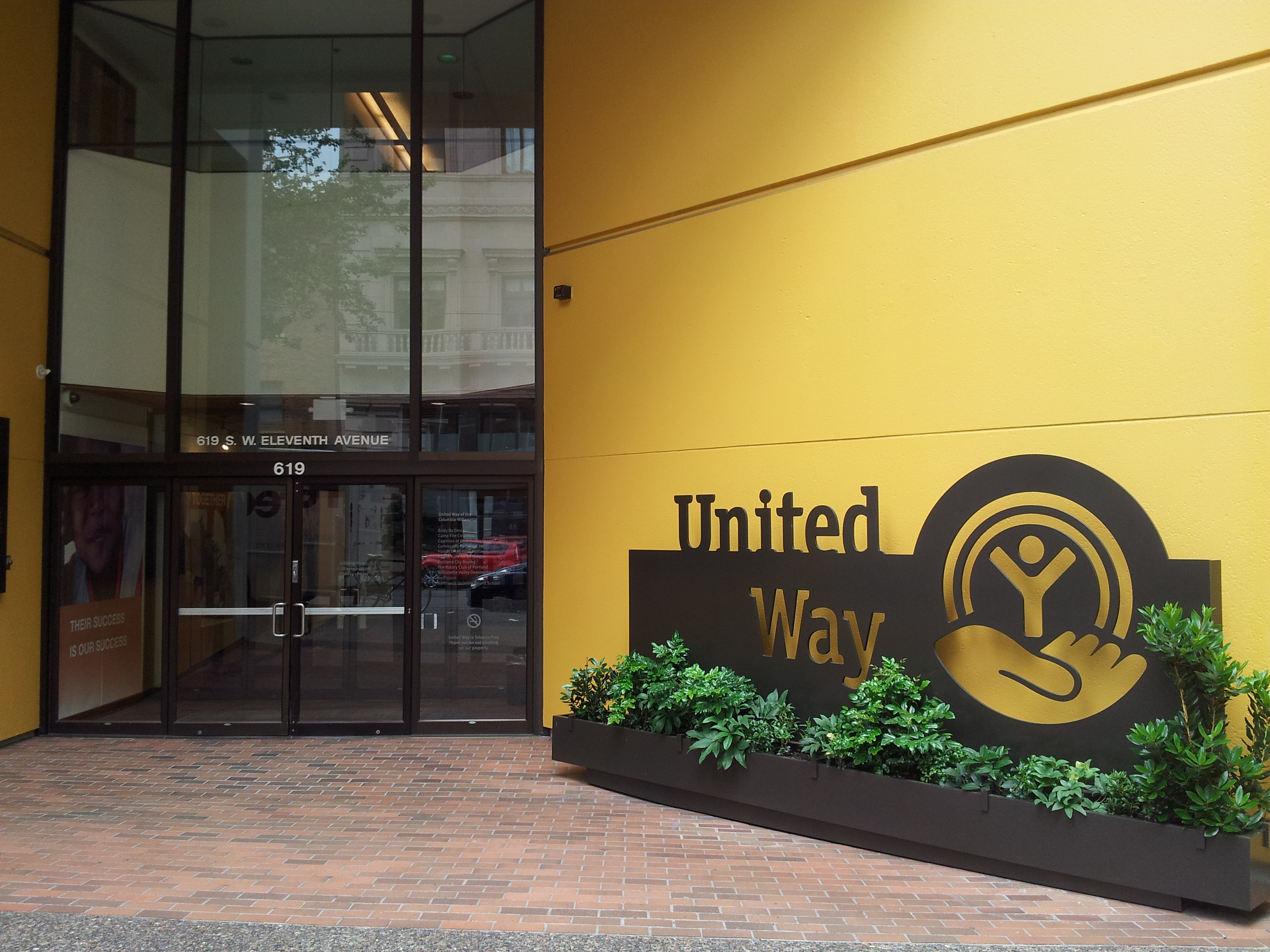
Top row: United Way campaign kick-off event
Middle: Delta plane with United Way branding below the aircraft's door
Bottom: United Way offices in Missouri and Portland, Oregon

In the year 2000, United Way of America announced a strategic shift in its focus away from simply being a fundraiser. United Way of America began promoting the Agenda for Community Impact model for local affiliates to adopt. Under the new model, United Ways would select local issues, focus fundraising efforts on those issues, and then make grants to nonprofits to carry out work addresses those issues. Instead of funding United Way's traditional base of nonprofit agencies, the focus shifted to funding high priority causes. For example: a United Way might focus on reducing infant mortality in the community and provide funds to the local branch of the YWCA to provide education to parents about Sudden Unexpected Infant Death (SUID).

As a nonprofit leader described it, "In the past if you got money [from United Way], unless you screwed up, you were pretty much assured that you were going to get that money." The Community Impact suggested that funds were no longer a guarantee and that grants were competitive and performance-based driven by a nonprofit's ability to achieve outcomes related to United Way goals.

Research by United Way of America showed that the approach was helping raise more funds. As a 2008 article in the Chronicle of Philanthropy stated,

In the five years since the organization announced it would focus on solving specific problems, the sums donated to 172 United Ways that adopted the so-called community-impact approach were 20 percent higher on average than giving to other United Ways. And among those using the community-impact approach, unrestricted donations are 26 percent higher than at other United Ways.

=== New reporting standards ===
In the wake of the Enron scandal, United Ways in 2002 faced questions on their accounting practices and discrepancies between different United Ways. In some cases, United Ways were double counting donations made across United Way territories which inflated their impact. These practices made their expense ratio seem lower by artificially inflating reported contributions.

After accounting issues came to light in the United Way in Washington, D.C. (and consequently exposed other problematic accounting practices within the United Way network), United Way of America adopted new accounting standards for its affiliates in 2003. United Way of America imposed new rules requiring all affiliates to adhere to a shared standard of reporting revenue and overhead costs, with the 150 largest affiliates required for the first time to submit financial information to outside accountants. Some United Ways were not able to meet the new standards and the board disaffiliated these 61 United Ways.

Some experts believed that the subsequent decline in United Way's 2002–03 campaign were the results of these accounting changes. In one case, the new reporting standards, which ended the practice of counting the value of in-kind donations in campaign totals, caused the United Way of Volusia-Flagler Counties in Daytona Beach to eliminate around $400,000 from its campaign results.

=== Competing with online giving platforms ===
By the 2000s, United Way has faced competition for control of the workplace campaign from technology companies offering customized platforms for employee giving and volunteering. One of the most promising competitors, Charitableway, raised $43 million in 2000 and secured agreements with Hewlett-Packard and Morgan Stanley to run their campaigns.

After the failure of the United Way Information Network and out of fear that the new for-profit companies would court their corporate supporters, a group of United Ways developed the online United eWay system to bring the traditional pen-and-paper pledge cards online. The software prototype was developed by a consortium of 50 United Ways with technical assistance from Microsoft. The product was run as a United Way of America subsidiary until it was purchased by CreateHope Inc. in 2008 and spun off as a separate for-profit company TRUiST, Inc.

Fundamentally our biggest "competition" is not other nonprofits. It's for-profit technology companies and startups who are building the software and technology for companies.

— Brian Gallagher on the rise of online platforms

Charitableway folded with the bursting of the dot-com bubble. However, other competitors like Benevity would fare better. Benevity was founded in 2008 and has become the workplace campaign provider of Apple, Microsoft, PayPal, T-Mobile, TripAdvisor, Charles Schwab, and Nike. Benevity processed $649 million in donations in the 2018 fiscal year. A 2020 report from Realized Worth's RW Institute found that there were 51 employee-giving technology platforms.

To better compete with technology companies, Salesforce.org (the philanthropic arm of Salesforce) and United Way Worldwide launched Philanthropy Cloud, a workplace donation platform, in 2018.

=== Gallagher's resignation ===
Gallagher resigned from United Way Worldwide in March 2021 following an investigation into the termination of three female employees at United Way Worldwide who had filed workplace sexual harassment complaints.

In November 2020, the HuffPost reported that three female employees at United Way Worldwide filed complaints between 2019 and 2020 with the Equal Employment Opportunity Commission. These complaints alleged sexual harassment and retaliation by UWW after they spoke up about the behavior.

In response to the allegations, United Way Worldwide commissioned Proskauer Rose to investigate the claims. The investigation found no "actionable harassment, discrimination, or retaliation" at the organization but the report also noted "the need to address the broader organizational and reputation issues." Lisa Bowman, who alleged then-CEO Brian Gallagher fired her as retaliation for reporting sexual harassment by another executive, called the inquiry "not a thorough, fair, or reliable investigation." United Way Worldwide's former vice president for labor engagement, Ana Avendaño, also filed a complaint with the EEOC alleging that United Way Worldwide retaliated by firing her after she uncovered sexual harassment of female United Way employees by AFL–CIO leaders. Avendaño said that while she was not contacted during the investigation she has "information that would've helped in the investigation." The third woman who filed an EEOC complaint (who did not want to be identified for fear of retaliation) said that she was not contacted either by the investigators and that she was "not at all surprised" about the report findings, "It's what I expected."

Gallagher said when announcing his retirement, "There is no evidence of a toxic or hostile culture. Is there room for improvement? Absolutely, just like almost any other workplace."

On October 15, 2021, Angela F. Williams replaced Gallagher as United Way Worldwide CEO. She is the first female and African-American to hold the position in United Way Worldwide's history. Previous to this position, Williams was the CEO at Easter Seals. She also worked as executive vice president, general counsel, and chief administration officer at YMCA of the USA.

== Cross–United Way partnerships and common initiatives ==
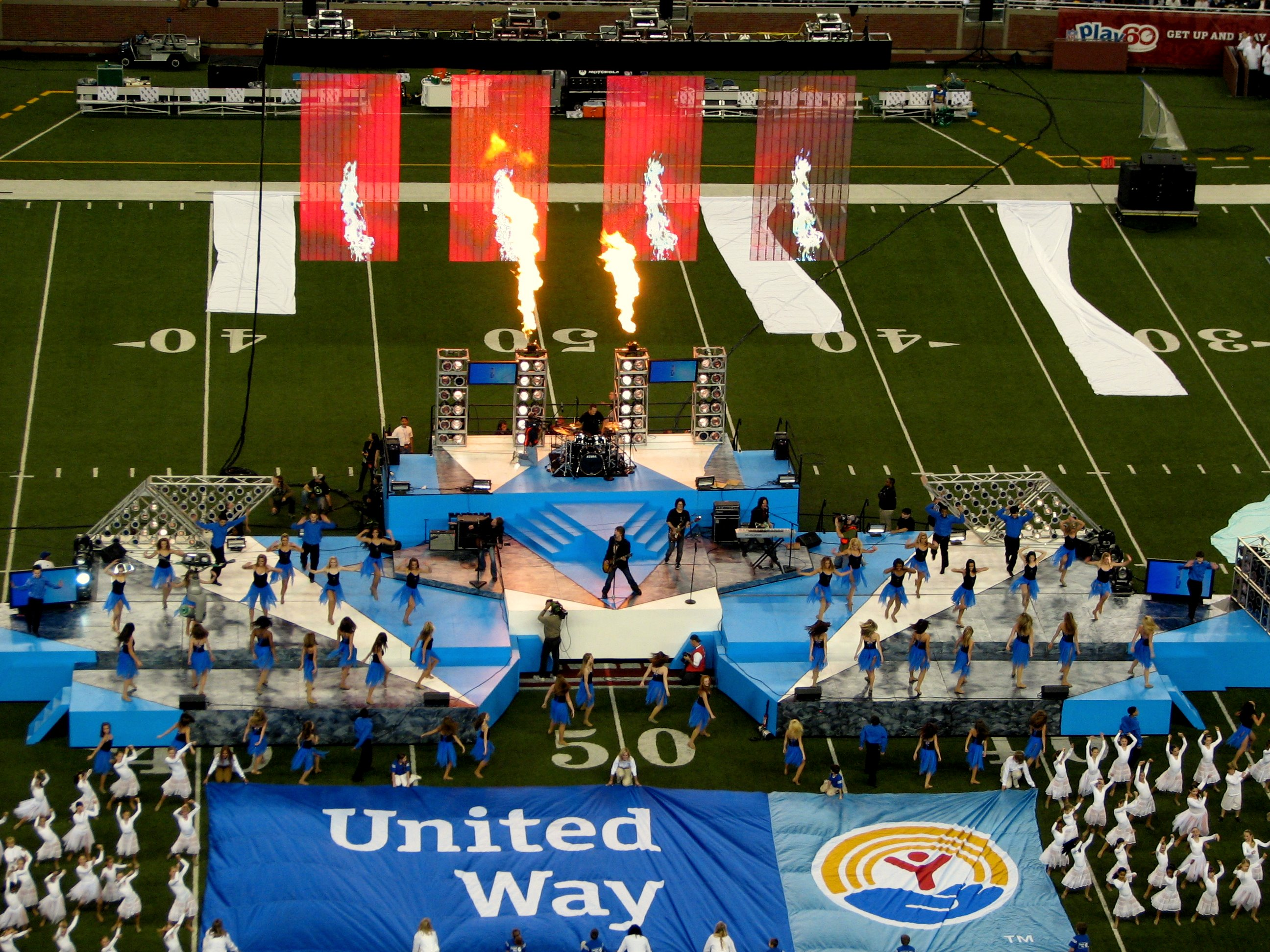
United Way branding at the 2007 NFL Thanksgiving Day game between Detroit and Green Bay

While each local United Way has its own programs and initiatives, there are some national and international initiatives that are formed between United Ways or by the United Way Worldwide body.

- NFL partnership: The ongoing partnership with the National Football League began in 1973 when the NFL and United Way of America came together to discuss the possibility of using the NFL's network contract airtime to promote United Way during game telecasts. NFL commissioner Pete Rozelle recognized the partnership as a viable means of communicating the good works of United Way while putting faces on a league of players hidden by helmets.
- Philanthropy Cloud: a workplace donation platform created in partnership with Salesforce. As of January 2020, over 200 companies, including 25 local United Ways, were using the service.
- Since 1946, the American Federation of Labor and Congress of Industrial Organizations (AFL–CIO) and United Way have enjoyed a cooperative relationship.
- Loaned Executive Program: In this program, participating companies "loan" skilled professionals on their payroll to volunteer for temporary fundraising assignments at local United Ways, while the employee's salary is paid by their employer. IBM, Texaco, Nestle, Honeywell, UPS, and NYNEX have participated in the program by volunteering their employees' time to United Way.
- Tocqueville Society: many United Ways have Tocqueville Societies (named after Alexis De Tocqueville) for donors giving more than $10,000 each year. Some local United Way organizations also offer a Tocqueville award to recognize philanthropy or community activism in their communities.

== Controversies ==
In United Way's history, it has been the subject of several local and national controversies.

- In 1986, The United Way of Cleveland, Ohio, held an event called Balloonfest '86, setting a world record by releasing 1.5 million balloons. The event had disastrous consequences, wreaking havoc at Burke Lakefront Airport and Lake Erie, causing injury to animals and contributing to two fishermen's deaths.
- In 1992, William Aramony, CEO of the national organization for over 20 years, retired amid allegations of fraud and financial mismanagement, of which he was subsequently convicted. He was sentenced to seven years in prison and fined $300,000.
- In 2004, Oral Suer, the CEO of United Way of the National Capital Area in Washington, D.C., was convicted of misuse of donations. He pleaded guilty to theft of almost $500,000 and was sentenced to 27 months in prison. Norman O. Taylor, Suer's replacement, was never charged with misconduct but was forced to resign.
- In 2006, Ralph Dickerson Jr., the former CEO of United Way of New York City, was found to have used $227,000 in United Way funds for personal expenses during 2002 and 2003. He later agreed to reimburse the organization.
- After the 2012 Sandy Hook Elementary School shooting, the United Way of Western Connecticut was criticized by some victims' family members for a lack of transparency in fundraising. According to those critical of the agency, the money was raised in a way that implied it would be used for the families, but then much of it re-purposed for broader community needs. As the organization focuses on community long term work, the United Way stated that majority was intended to go to non-exclusive, community support programs like counseling, after school or job-support programs; however, this angered those who felt the money should go directly to the families of those affected.
- In 2021, United Way Worldwide CEO Brian Gallagher resigned over claims of mishandled complaints of sexual harassment and discrimination at the United Way Worldwide office. Three female employees had filed complaints with the EEOC alleging they experienced sexual harassment and that they were retaliated against by United Way Worldwide after speaking out about the harassment.

== Criticisms ==
=== Donation coercion in the workplace ===
While United Way's workplace fundraising campaigns may help encourage higher donation levels among co-workers, it may also lead to employees feeling pressure to take part. Some employees may feel coerced to donate to United Way by their co-workers or management soliciting contributions in their workplace.

A reporter with the Atlanta Business Chronicle described it as this: "The problem with the United Way's methods is simple: When the CEO of a company gathers employees in a room and strongly encourages them to donate to the United Way, most of them are going to donate. And many will be doing so out of fear that there could be consequences if they don't."

United Way lists guidelines on its national website to prevent coercion, including having non-managers lead the solicitation and discouraging setting campaigns with 100 percent participation goals.

=== Role as an intermediary in the donation process ===
Some have labeled United Way a "middleman" since it raises funds and then passes them on to nonprofit agencies. In 2007, Brian Gallagher said that critics who still see United Way that way have not followed more recent developments of the organization: "Six years ago we were much more focused – or split – on fund-raising. ... Instead of the model being 'one campaign for all; give us the money and we'll decide where it goes', we moved to a model where we identified issues, strategies and products, and segmented our markets so we knew what women and young people, and corporations and foundations, cared about." Addressing the middle man label directly he said that "nobody wants anything or one in the middle of a transaction that doesn't add value. ... Folks use the term middle man as a negative. It is not a negative if it adds value."

=== Monopolistic practices ===
United Way has been criticized for its dominance over workplace giving and for making exclusionary funding decisions. In 1978, the National Commission on Neighborhoods released a report prepared by the National Committee for Responsive Philanthropy which found that United Way used "both fair and foul" practices to "monopolize solicitation of employees at the workplace." The report claimed that United Way is "an exclusionary group, designed to keep out most neighborhood groups and smaller charities." The report called for a repeal of the organization's policies "which insist on a monopoly of workplace solicitation."

United Way of America senior vice president Robert Beggan responded to the allegations saying, "We neither control payroll deductions, nor do we exclude other organizations from seeking payroll deductions." Addressing the exclusionary allocations claim he said, "we allocate money [to member charities] on need, not on emotion. ... There's a finite amount of money available and an infinite amount of need, and we have to be careful." By the mid-1970s, just 13 nonprofits (including the YMCA, the Red Cross, the Boy Scouts and the Girl Scouts, and the Salvation Army) accounted for more than 57% of all United Way allocations.

To limit competing with fundraisers from disease-related nonprofit organizations, some United Ways have signed contractual agreements with nonprofits guaranteeing them with a level of funding if they incorporate their fundraising efforts under United Way's campaign.

By design, United Way aims to provide support for large, local human service organizations through a process of consensus decision making. The result inevitably favors funding of moderate and traditional agencies over civil rights and controversial causes. Planned Parenthood, The Boy Scouts of America, counseling services for gay youth, and, initially, programs for people with HIV/AIDS have been excluded to avoid turning off potential donors.

== See also ==
- Central Community Chest of Japan
- Metro United Way
- United Way New Zealand
- United Way of Canada
- United Way of Metropolitan Chicago
- United Way Worldwide
- Asset Limited, Income Constrained, Employed
