= Spoons Across America =

US non-profit organization

Spoons Across America is an American non-profit organization founded in 2001 providing children's food, nutrition, education, and networking for providers. Spoons Across America is a member of America's Charities.
