= America's Charities =

American nonprofit organization

- Formation: 1980
- Type: 501(c)(3) nonprofit organization
- Tax ID no.: 54-1517707
- Purpose: Provides charities with income through workplace giving and additional paths.
- Headquarters: Chantilly, Virginia
- Region served: United States
- President and Chief Executive Officer: Jim Starr
- Chair: Heather Lofkin Wright
- Revenue: $24,694,949 (2014)
- Expenses: $24,791,912 (2014)
- Employees: 44
- Volunteers: 362
- Website: www.charities.org

America's Charities is a 501(c)(3) membership-based nonprofit, representing more than 130 charitable organizations in workplace giving campaigns for employers in public and private sectors: the Combined Federal Campaign, the federal government’s workplace giving campaign, state and local governments, and nonprofits. In its 40 years, America's Charities has raised more than $750 million for more than 20,000 nonprofits addressing causes including education, human rights, hunger, poverty, research, animal welfare, veteran assistance, disaster relief, and health services. It is based in Chantilly, Virginia.

== Background ==
Historically, most workplace giving campaigns in the United States were managed by a different group of charitable federations under the United Way name.

Since 1980, America's Charities has represented such charities as Make-A-Wish Foundation of America, Give Kids The World Village, NAACP Special Contributions Fund, Ronald McDonald House Charities, and The Humane Society of the United States in workplace giving campaigns.

In 2002, after a scandal at United Way of the National Capital Area (Washington, D.C.), America's Charities was selected by numerous major employers to help them administer their workplace giving campaigns. These employers included Lockheed Martin, ExxonMobil, AARP, National Geographic and some 15 others.

In 2004, the United Way of the National Capital Area suspended America's Charities from that fall's United Way campaign, stating that America's Charities had "violated the terms of agreement".

By 2008, America's Charities was raising more than $34 million for its members and more than 5,000 other charities in the U.S. from workplace giving campaigns.

America's Charities offered clients a state-of-the art web-based system for employer use in conducting workplace campaigns. This system, PledgeFirst, was used by leading employers such as Lockheed Martin, AARP, the City of Orlando, and Amazon. PledgeFirst was phased out beginning in 2015.

Today, America's Charities partners with various technology providers to offer employers a suite of workplace giving tools.

In late July 2019, America's Charities acquired the Causecast giving platform, which "expands America’s Charities suite of giving and engagement solutions."

== See also ==
- Spoons Across America
- United Way of America
