= Masamichi Yamagiwa =

Masamichi Yamagiwa

Masamichi Yamagiwa (山際正道, Yamagiwa Masamichi; June 12, 1901 – March 16, 1975) was a Japanese businessman, central banker, the 20th Governor of the Bank of Japan (BOJ).

== Early life ==
Yamagiwa was born in Tokyo.

== Career ==
Yamagiwa was Governor of the Bank of Japan from November 30, 1956, through December 17, 1964.

When the Japanese Cabinet accepted the Yamagiwa's resignation, his health was mentioned as the main reason for stepping down before the end of his second five-year term. At this time, the president of the Mitsubishi Bank, Makoto Usami, was already identified as successor.

== Notes ==
Government offices
Preceded by Eikichi Araki (2nd term)	Governor of the Bank of Japan; 1956–1964	Succeeded by Makoto Usami
Political offices
Preceded by Yutaka Tanaka	Vice-Minister of Finance; 1945–1946	Succeeded by Yoshimi Yamada
Business positions
Preceded by Aiichirō Fujiyama	Chairman of the Japan Association of Corporate Executives; 1952–1955	Succeeded by Takeo Shōji
