= Brian Gallagher =

Former CEO of United Way Worldwide

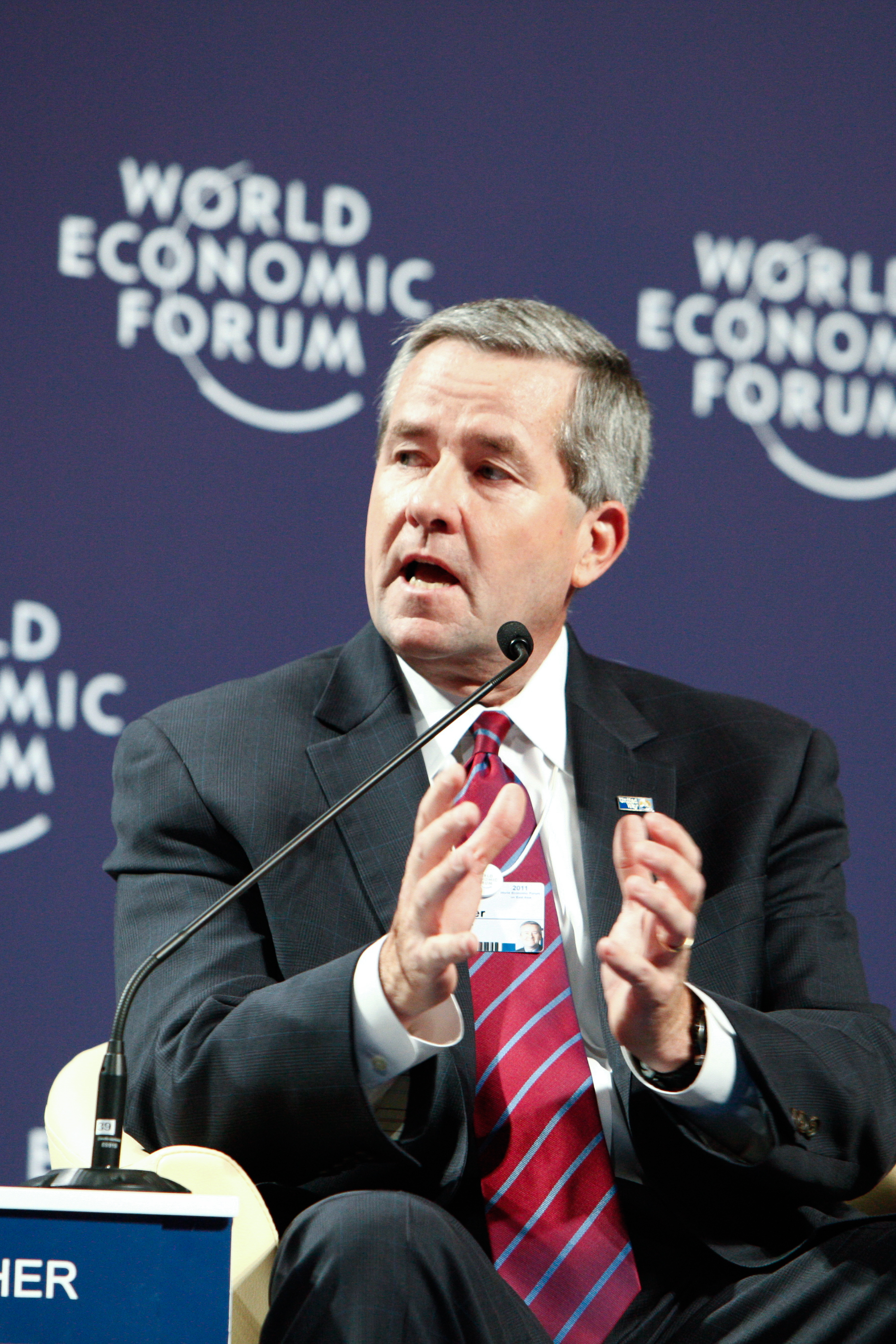
Brian Gallagher at the World Economic Forum on East Asia in Jakarta, Indonesia, June 12, 2011

Brian Gallagher is a nonprofit executive. He is the former president and CEO of United Way Worldwide.

== Early life and education ==
Gallagher was born in Chicago, Illinois. He was raised in Hobart, Indiana, where he was one of six children. His father was a plumber and his mother was a homemaker who reupholstered chairs for extra income.

In 1981, he graduated from Ball State University with a degree in social work and started with the United Way as a management trainee. In 1992, he received his MBA from Emory University, and in 2003 Ball State University awarded Gallagher an honorary Doctor of Humanities.

== Career ==
After working for United Way for 21 years (with the last five at the United Way in Columbus), Gallagher was appointed to be the president and CEO of the United Way of America in 2002. He held this position until 2009 when United Way of America and United Way International joined to form United Way Worldwide.

In January 2017, he was appointed by then-Governor of Indiana Mike Pence as a trustee of his alma mater Ball State University for a term lasting until December 31, 2020.

In March 2021, Gallagher resigned from United Way following allegations that United Way Worldwide retaliated against employees for reporting sexual harassment. Three female employees had filed complaints with the Equal Employment Opportunity Commission alleging misconduct and retaliation after they filed their complaints. One of the woman alleged Gallagher fired her as retaliation for reporting sexual harassment by another unnamed executive. A United Way Worldwide commissioned investigation found no “actionable harassment, discrimination, or retaliation” at the organization, but the women who filed the complaints called those findings into question. Gallagher said of the allegations: “There is no evidence of a toxic or hostile culture. Is there room for improvement? Absolutely, just like almost any other workplace.”
