= United Way New Zealand =

New Zealand charitable organization

United Way New Zealand (UWNZ), officially known as United Way (NZ) Inc., is a charitable organization in New Zealand. It was established in 1975 as the United Way of Greater Auckland. In 1998, the geographic scope of the organization was expanded, and the name was changed to reflect the new national focus.

UWNZ currently provides funding for approximately 200 charities in New Zealand.

== See also ==
- United Way
