= Red Feather Development Group =

U.S. nonprofit organization

- Founded: Bellevue, Washington (1994)
- Type: Non-profit, Interest group
- Location: Bozeman, Montana
- Services: Education and Home Repair Solutions
- Website: www.redfeather.org

Red Feather Development Group is a non-profit organization that empowers Native American communities to be self-sustaining to ensure safe and healthy homes for all who live on the Native American reservations. The organization has been featured on The Oprah Winfrey Show, where it won a "Use Your Life Award" from the Oprah's Angel Network, in Dwell, and in the Chicago Sun Times among other national publications.

Red Feather incorporates environmentally and culturally sustainable materials and practices into its education efforts. Work on the reservations is done in partnership with American Indian communities to address the severe housing crisis within their nations through educating on home weatherization, home maintenance techniques and facilitating volunteerism.

== History ==
Red Feather Development Group was founded in 1994 in Bellevue, Washington, by Robert and Anita Young. The mission of the organization came to fruition because of an Indian Country Today article about the extreme cold weather and how tribal members were freezing to death in their homes. The organization was named after Katherine Red Feather, the first Native American to receive the organization's services. For the first six years the organization was operated by the Youngs and they built conventional housing, home rehabilitation and updates with the help of volunteers. In 1999, with the help of the University of Washington College of Built Environments, the Youngs were able to launch the American Indian Sustainable Housing Initiative. The Initiative focused solely on straw-bale building techniques and emphasized housing self-sufficiency with partner tribal communities. Eighteen homes were built over ten years in 28-day cycles with the help of volunteers from around the country. Currently, Red Feather partners with the Northern Cheyenne, Navajo and Hopi Reservations. In 2003, the organization moved to Bozeman, Montana, to be closer to the native communities with whom it partners and serves. In 2010, Red Feather opened the Flagstaff, Arizona, office.

== Programs ==
EDUCATIONAL OUTREACH: Red Feather provides hands-on training of all members of the Native American community (women, children, veterans, families and elders) for safe and healthy home technology and repair. The workshops are "Do It Yourself" on home weatherization and home maintenance. Red Feather is currently developing two new workshops on the health linkages to the burning of wood and coal stoves in reservation homes and the impact of mold and mildew in reservation homes. Red Feather is a partner with APS (Arizona Public Service) to present weatherization workshops and interventions to improve energy-efficient homes. Red Feather partners with tribal resources such as the Northern Cheyenne Tribal Housing Authority to build self-sustaining communities for safe and healthy housing through tenant seminars.

NATIVE HOMES REPAIR NETWORK: Red Feather partners with Native American homeowners to identify housing repair needs and access to resources to solve their home issues. Using a case management process, Red Feather is currently piloting assistance through home repair and health assessment professionals to assess reservation homes for health risks and necessary repairs.

COMMUNITY DEVELOPMENT AND SPECIAL PROJECTS: Red Feather engages in projects on the three reservations that require special intervention. In 2015, a $70,000 home renovation project was initiated for Navajo Code Talker Dan Akee, a WWII veteran and one of 12 living Navajo Code Talkers. Red Feather engages volunteers from all walks of life to contribute to housing projects on Native American reservations.
