= Central Community Chest of Japan =

Japanese non-profit organization

The Central Community Chest of Japan (Japanese: 共同募金, Hepburn: Kyōdōbokin) (CCCJ), established in 1947 as a post–World War II effort to rebuild Japan, has promoted national welfare throughout the country for more than 60 years. Central Community Chest of Japan is a national organization with a vast network of local members. CCCJ acts as a national coordinating body for local Community Chests. Local affiliate offices are managed by individual and autonomous Board of Directors. Each of the 47 prefectural Community Chests have set up district offices in large cities and branch offices in smaller municipalities within the prefecture to act as implementing bodies for the movement. District and branch offices nationwide, implement fundraising activities, organize and train volunteers, conduct public relations, and survey the financial needs providing welfare services.

It is a part of United Way Worldwide.
