= Ōnogi Hidejirō =

Japanese politician

- 大野木 秀次郎
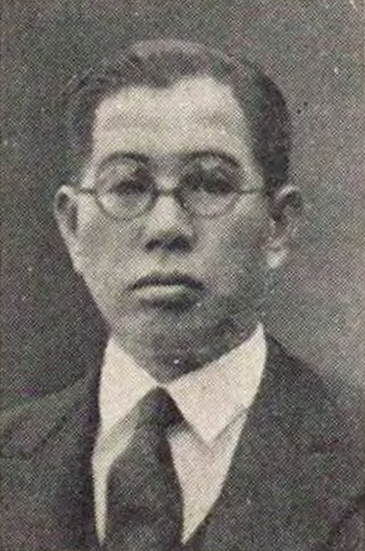
- Ōnogi in 1946

Member of the House of Councillors
- In office 3 May 1947 – 4 March 1966
- Preceded by: Constituency established
- Succeeded by: Yukio Hayashida
- Constituency: Kyoto at-large

Member of the House of Peers
- In office 1946 – 2 May 1947 Nominated by the Emperor

Personal details
- Born: 25 November 1895 Yamashina, Kyoto, Japan
- Died: 4 March 1966 (aged 70) Kamigyō, Kyoto, Japan
- Party: Liberal Democratic (1955–1966)
- Other political affiliations: JLP (1945–1948); DLP (1948–1950); LP (1950–1955)
- Education: Ritsumeikan University

Ōnogi Hidejirō (大野木 秀次郎; 25 November 1895 – 4 March 1966) was a politician of the Liberal Party, representing Kyoto in the House of Councillors for four consecutive terms.

== Early life and education ==
Born in Yamashina (now Yamashina Ward), Higashiyama Ward, Kyoto in 1895, he attended the Ritsumeikan University Economics Department but left before graduating to serve as president of Ōnogi Manufacturing Co. Ltd. (大野木製作所).

== Political career ==
He was elected to the House of Councillors in 1947, a seat he won four times. During his tenure as a councilor, Ōnogi served as Deputy Agent to the signing of the Treaty of San Francisco, Chairman of the LDP in the House of Councillors, the first President of the LDP (Kyoto Branch), and Minister of State in the 3rd, 4th and 5th Yoshida cabinets.

Ōnogi's private residence, a State Guest House built to entertain foreign dignitaries is now a wedding venue and French restaurant, managed by the Ōnogi family in the Yamashina Ward of Kyoto.

== Later life ==
Ōnogi served as Chairman of the Kyoto Chamber of Commerce and Industry and was active directing a number of shrines and temples, such as Kurama-dera, Chion-in, Myōshin-ji and Sennyū-ji. He was active in the education industry, serving as Director of Ritsumeikan University, Kyoto Pharmaceutical University and Kyoto University of Foreign Studies.
