= Akiko Kurabayashi =

Japanese politician

- 倉林 明子
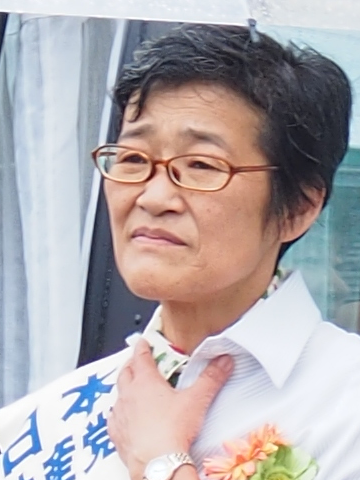
- Kurabayashi in 2019

Member of the House of Councillors
- In office 29 July 2013 – 28 July 2025
- Preceded by: Koji Matsui
- Succeeded by: Shohei Niimi
- Constituency: Kyoto at-large

Member of the Kyoto City Assembly
- In office 1995–2013
- Constituency: Nakagyō Ward

Member of the Kyoto Prefectural Assembly
- In office 1994–1995
- Constituency: Nakagyō Ward

Personal details
- Born: 3 December 1960 (age 65) Nishiaizu, Fukushima, Japan
- Party: Communist
- Education: Kyoto Municipal Junior College of Nursing

Akiko Kurabayashi (Japanese: 倉林 明子; born 3 December 1960) is a Japanese politician, serving as member of the Japanese House of Councillors since 2013. A member of the Japanese Communist Party, she represents the Kyoto at-large district.

== Career ==
Kurabayashi is a former nurse and she had previously served on the Kyoto Prefectural Assembly, to which she was elected in 1994. She also served as a member of the Kyoto City Assembly, to which she served five terms, starting with her election to the assembly in 1995. Kurabayashi was elected to her position in the National Diet in 2013.

Kurabayashi is opposed to the pension reform bill that was enacted in 2016, saying that the reduced pension benefits would weight heavily on the Japanese public. She is also opposed to allowing non-Japanese trainees to work in the Japanese nursing industry, saying that the plan would not permanently address the chronic labour shortage in Japan's nursing industry.
