= Satoshi Ninoyu =

Japanese politician

- 二之湯 智
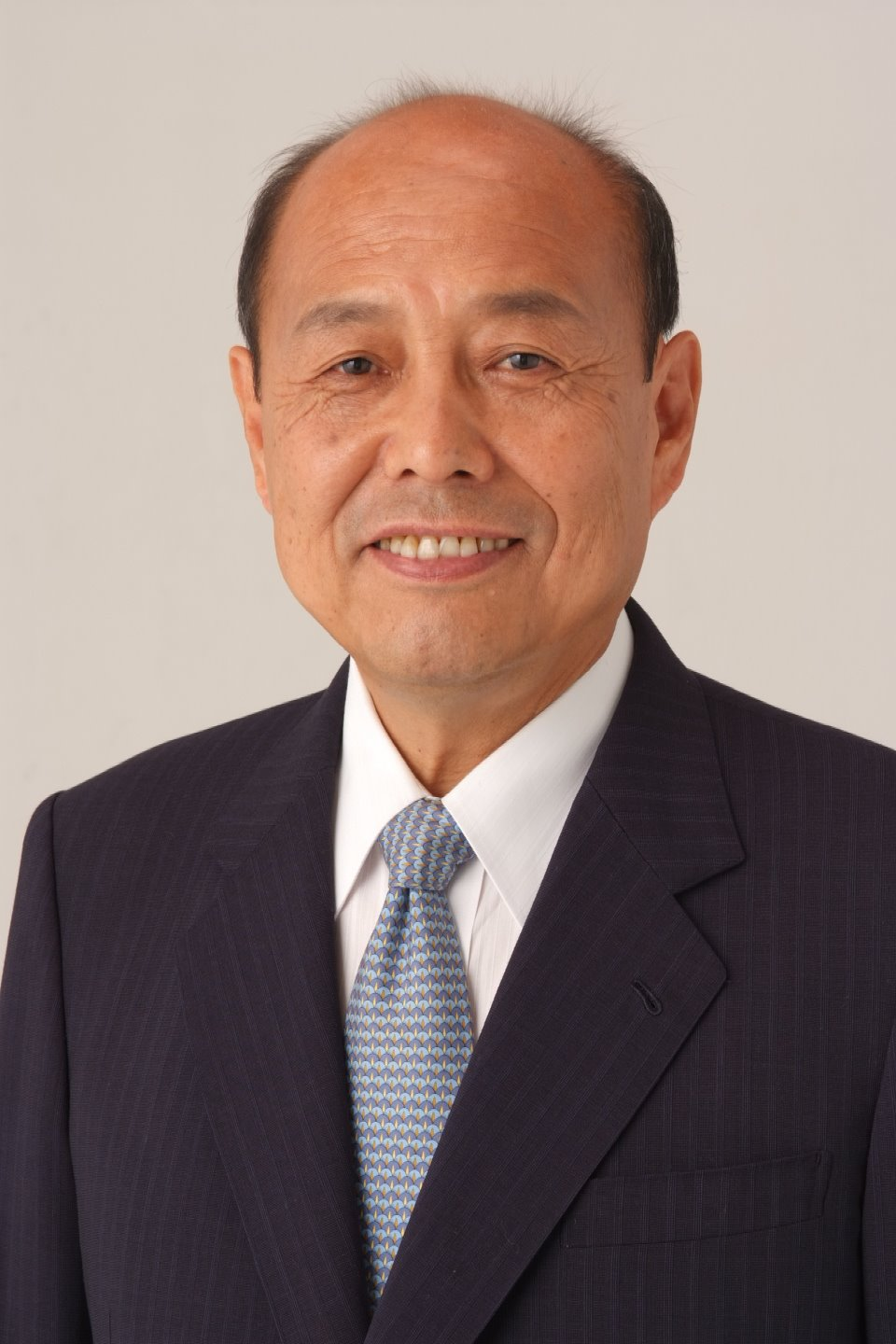
- Official portrait, 2021

Chairman of the National Public Safety Commission
- In office 4 October 2021 – 10 August 2022
- Prime Minister: Fumio Kishida
- Preceded by: Yasufumi Tanahashi
- Succeeded by: Koichi Tani

Member of the House of Councillors
- In office 26 July 2004 – 25 July 2022
- Preceded by: Tokiko Nishiyama
- Succeeded by: Akira Yoshii
- Constituency: Kyoto at-large

Chairman of the Kyoto City Council
- In office 24 May 1999 – 29 May 2001
- Preceded by: Ryuzo Nakano
- Succeeded by: Toshiko Isobe

Member of the Kyoto City Council
- In office 1987–2003
- Constituency: Ukyō Ward

Personal details
- Born: 13 September 1944 (age 82) Kyoto, Japan
- Party: Liberal Democratic
- Children: Takeshi Ninoyu
- Education: Keio University

Satoshi Ninoyu (二之湯 智, Ninoyu Satoshi; born September 13, 1944) is a Japanese politician of the Liberal Democratic Party, and served as a member of the House of Councillors in the Diet (national legislature).

== Early life ==
Ninoyu is a native of Kyoto, Kyoto and graduated from Keio University, in Tokyo.

== Political career ==
Ninoyu served in the Kyoto City Council for five terms from 1987 to 2003.

He was elected to the House of Councillors, representing the Kyoto at-large constituency, for the first time in 2004, and served until his retirement from politics in 2022.

=== Positions held ===
Ninoyu has served as State Minister of Internal Affairs and Communications, House of Councillors chair of Committee on Education, Culture and Science, LDP Director-General of Personnel Bureau, and Acting Chair of Party Organization and Campaign Headquarters. He is also Deputy Secretary-General of Japan-Myanmar Parliamentary Friendship Association, member of Japan-Laos Parliamentary Friendship Association, and Permanent Secretary of Japan-Philippines Parliamentary Friendship Association.

=== Abe assassination aftermath ===
Following the assassination of former-prime minister Abe, reports have highlighted Ninoyu's connections to the Unification Church (Moon sect), including leading an executive committee for the 2018 church-linked event.

As National Public Safety Commission chairperson, Ninoyu ordered police authorities to set up an investigation panel to look into the security issues following former-premier Shinzo Abe's assassination.

== Family ==
Ninoya’s son Takeshi Ninoya also served as a representative in the House of Councillors from 2013 to 2019, representing the Shiga Prefecture constituency.

His other son Shinji Ninoya was a member of the Kyoto Prefectural Assembly.
