= Kyoto 5th district =

Constituency of the Japanese House of Representatives

Kyoto 5th District
- 京都府第5区
- Parliamentary constituency for the Japanese House of Representatives
- Prefecture: Kyoto
- Proportional district: Kinki
- Electorate: 236,343 (as of September 2022)

Current constituency
- Created: 1994
- Seats: One
- Party: LDP
- Representative: Taro Honda

Kyōto 5th district is a constituency of the House of Representatives in the Diet of Japan (national legislature). It is located in Kyōto and covers the northwestern part of the prefecture on the Sea of Japan coast. The district consists of the cities of Fukuchiyama, Maizuru, Ayabe, Miyazu and Kyōtango as well as the Yosa District. As of 2012, 254,636 eligible voters were registered in the district.

Before the electoral reform of 1994, the area was part of Kyōto 2nd district where five representatives had been elected by single non-transferable vote.

From the creation of the district until 2017, the representative for the 5th district was Sadakazu Tanigaki (LDP, Tanigaki→Koga faction) who had previously represented the old 2nd district since his father's death in 1983. In 2009, the 5th district was the only district in Kyōto the LDP could defend against the landslide for Yukio Hatoyama's Democratic Party. Tanigaki's Democratic challenger Mai Ohara lost the district by 7,000 votes but easily won a seat on the Kinki PR list. After the election that swept the LDP from power, Tanigaki was elected LDP president. During his term the opposition won a majority in the 2010 House of Councillors election. After one term, he did not run for re-election as party president. In the 2012 House of Representatives election that brought devastating results for the Democratic Party at record low turnout nationwide, Tanigaki lost only few votes and clearly defended his district seat. Tanigaki injured his spinal cord in a bicycle accident in July 2016, and remained hospitalized as of September 2017; he decided not to run in the 2017 general election due to his physical condition.

== Areas covered ==
=== Current district ===
As of 5 January 2023, the areas covered by the district are as follows:

- Fukuchiyama
- Maizuru
- Ayabe
- Miyazu
- Kyōtango
- Yosa District

In 2004, the districts of Naka, Takeno and Kumano merged to form the city of Kyōtango. Amata District disappeared when the last of its towns merged into Fukuchiyama in 2006

=== Areas from before 2013 ===
From its creation in 1994 until redistricting in 2013, the areas covered by this district were as follows:

- Fukuchiyama
- Maizuru
- Ayabe
- Miyazu
- Amata District
- Kasa District
- Yosa District
- Naka District
- Takeno District
- Kumano District

== List of representatives ==
Representative	Party	Dates	Notes
Sadakazu Tanigaki	LDP	1996 – 2017	
Tarō Honda	LDP	2017 –	

== Election results ==
2026
Party	Candidate	Votes	%	±%
LDP	Tarō Honda	84,865	77.0	▲30.67
JCP	Ken Yamauchi	25,363	23.0	▲11.86
Registered electors		223,914		
Turnout		110,228	52.31	▼3.28
LDP hold				

2024
Party	Candidate	Votes	%	±%
LDP	Tarō Honda	57,455	46.32	▼3.08
CDP	Wakako Yamamoto	32,355	26.09	
Ishin	Takaya Michimoto	20,387	16.44	
JCP	Ken Yamauchi	13,831	11.15	▼0.62
Registered electors		228,513		
Turnout		124,028	55.59	▼3.90
LDP hold				

2021
Party	Candidate	Votes	%	±%
LDP	Tarō Honda	68,693	49.4	▲6.1
CDP	Wakako Yamamoto	32,108	23.1	
Independent	Kazunori Inouchi	21,904	15.7	▲1,6
JCP	Ken Yamauchi	16,375	11.8	▼3.5
Turnout			59.49	▲2.28
LDP hold				

2017
Party	Candidate	Votes	%	±%
LDP	Tarō Honda	60,277	43.3	▼13.3
Independent	Yasushi Nakayama	30,665	22.0	
JCP	Ken Yamauchi	21,234	15.3	▲0.8
Kibō no Tō	Kazunori Inouchi (won Kinki PR seat)	19,586	14.1	
Independent	Mariko Suzuki	7,464	5.4	
Turnout			57.21	▲1.67
LDP hold				

2014
Party	Candidate	Votes	%	±%
LDP	Sadakazu Tanigaki	76,733	56.6	▲0.1
Democratic	Mai Ohara	39,178	28.9	▲3.8
JCP	Ken Yamauchi	19,558	14.4	▲2.0
Turnout			55.54	▼7.80
LDP hold				

2012
Party	Candidate	Votes	%	±%
LDP (Komeito)	Sadakazu Tanigaki	87,879	56.5	
Democratic	Mai Ohara	39,009	25.1	
JCP	Sayumi Yoshida	19,225	12.4	
Tomorrow (NP-Daichi)	Norio Numata	9,434	6.1	

2009
Party	Candidate	Votes	%	±%
LDP (Komeito)	Sadakazu Tanigaki	87,998		
Democratic (People's New)	Mai Ohara (won Kinki PR seat)	80,966		
JCP	Sayumi Yoshida	17,941		
Happiness Realization	Keiji Takuma	2,225		
Turnout		192,253	74.1	

2005
Party	Candidate	Votes	%	±%
LDP	Sadakazu Tanigaki	107,792		
Democratic	Tetsuya Kobayashi	49,895		
JCP	Sayumi Yoshida	25,467		
Turnout		187,244	70.51	

2003
Party	Candidate	Votes	%	±%
LDP	Sadakazu Tanigaki	103,486		
Democratic	Tetsuya Kobayashi	36,702		
JCP	Sayumi Yoshida	24,389		
Turnout		169,542	63.51	

2000
Party	Candidate	Votes	%	±%
LDP	Sadakazu Tanigaki	109,508		
JCP	Sayumi Yoshida	34,952		
Democratic	Masahiko Yano	27,897		

1996
Party	Candidate	Votes	%	±%
LDP	Sadakazu Tanigaki	91,146		
New Frontier	Takashi Mikami	36,689		
JCP	Ichirō Sado	32,691		
Turnout		167,304	62.8	
