= Taro Honda =

Japanese politician (born 1973)

- 本田 太郎
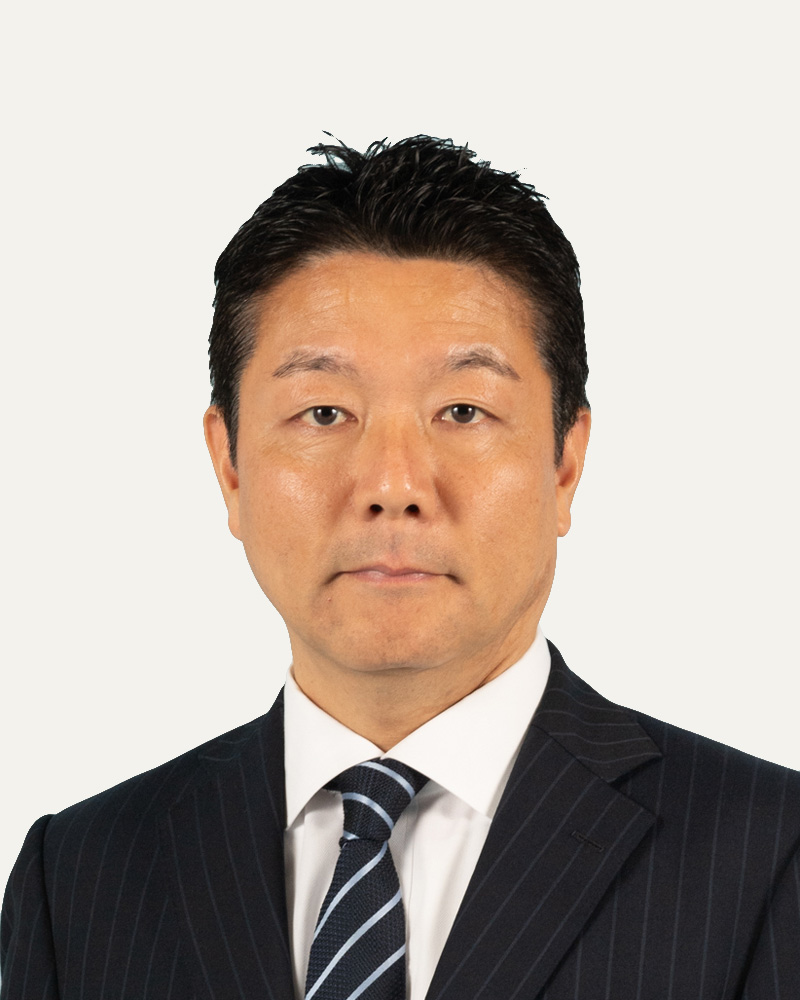
- Official portrait, 2024

Member of the House of Representatives
- Incumbent
- Assumed office 22 October 2017
- Preceded by: Sadakazu Tanigaki
- Constituency: Kyoto 5th

Member of the Kyoto Prefectural Assembly
- In office 2015–2017
- Constituency: Miyazu & Yosa-gun

Personal details
- Born: 1 December 1973 (age 52) Mukō, Kyoto, Japan
- Party: Liberal Democratic
- Education: University of Tokyo; Waseda University

Taro Honda (本田太郎, Honda Taro; born 1 December 1973) is a Japanese politician serving as a member of the House of Representatives since 2017. From 2015 to 2017, he was a member of the Kyoto Prefectural Assembly.
