= Yūmi Yoshikawa =

Japanese politician (born 1973)

- 吉川 有美
- Official portrait, 2017

Member of the House of Councillors
- In office 29 July 2013 – 28 July 2025
- Preceded by: Chiaki Takahashi
- Succeeded by: Tomoko Kojima
- Constituency: Mie at-large

Personal details
- Born: 4 September 1973 (age 53) Kuwana, Mie, Japan
- Party: Liberal Democratic
- Education: Tokyo University of Agriculture; Tokyo University of Agriculture and Technology

Yūmi Yoshikawa (吉川有美, Yoshikawa Yūmi; born 4 September 1973) is a Japanese politician who is a former member of the House of Councillors of Japan.

== Biography ==
In 2013, she ran as the Liberal Democratic Party candidate for the Mie Prefecture electoral district in the House of Councillors elections, receiving 373,035 votes and winning. She became the first LDP member of the House of Councillors in Mie Prefecture since former House of Councillors President Juro Saito, 15 years earlier.

In July 2019, she was elected for a second term in that year's House of Councillors elections. In October of the same year, she was appointed Chairman of the House of Councillors' Education, Culture, Sports, Science and Technology Committee. In October 2021, she was appointed parliamentary vice-minister of Economy, Trade and Industry and Parliamentary Vice-Minister of Cabinet Office, Ministry of Economy, Trade and Industry, retaining this job until August 2022.
