= Shohei Niimi =

Japanese politician (born 1989)

- 新実 彰平
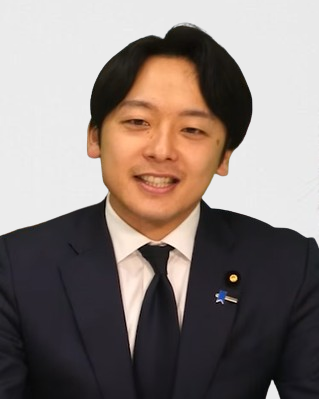
- Niimi in 2026

Member of the House of Councillors
- Incumbent
- Assumed office 29 July 2025
- Preceded by: Akiko Kurabayashi
- Constituency: Kyoto at-large

Personal details
- Born: 10 April 1989 (age 37) Kyoto, Japan
- Party: Innovation
- Education: Kyoto University (LL.B.)

Shohei Niimi (新実彰平, Niimi Shohei; born 10 April 1989) is a Japanese politician who has served as a member of the House of Councillors in 2025. A member of Ishin no Kai (Japan Innovation Party), Niimi previosuly worked as a television presenter for Kansai TV from 2012 to 2024

== Biography ==
=== Early life, education, and career ===
Niimi was born in on 10 April 1989 in Sakyo- ku, a ward of Kyoto City, the capital of Kyoto Prefecture. He attended Kyoto University, where he was a member of the university's baseball team. He studied Law and Politics at the Faculty of Law school, graduating in 2012.

Upon graduation, he joined Kansai Television as an announcer. Beginning in October 2012, he hosted his first regular program since joining the company, as a sports caster on Mondays and Tuesdays. In 2014, Niimi received the Best Newcomer Award at the 30th annual Fuji Television Announcer Awards. He received the Announcing Award (Grand Prize) at the 32nd annual Fuji Television Announcer Awards in 2016. Niimi also appeared in a drama series that aired for a short period on Kansai Television in 2017. In March of that year, he became the youngest main caster in the history of Kansai Television's weekday evening news program, at the age of 27. He returned to sportscasting in March 2023. Niimi left the station in September 2024, in part due to controversial remarks regarding former Prime Minister Shinzo Abe following his assassination in 2022.

=== Political career ===
On 12 October 2024, Niimi announced his intention to stand as a candidate for the Japan Innovation Party in the 2025 Upper House election, seeking to represent Kyoto at-large. In the election held on 20 Juky 2025, Niimi was victorious, claiming about 28% of the vote to become one of two people to represent Kyoto in the House of Councillors, along with the LDP's Shoji Nishida, who came in second place following Niimi.

== Political views ==
Niimi supports expanding Japan's social safety net. He is in favor of providing financial support for families with children to alleviate the declining birth rate. Niimi has advocated for a universal basic income.

He supported the My Number card integration reforms implemented by then-Digital Minister Kono Taro during the Fumio Kishida administration.

Niimi supports a ban on corporate donations to political parties.

He is in favor of amending Article 9 of the Constitution to explicitly state the existence of the Self-Defense Forces, and supports the US-Japan alliance. In 2025, Niimi said he was in favor of increasing defense spending.

On social issues, he supports the concept of a "female Emperor", the legalization of same-sex marriage, and allowing married couples to have separate surnames.

== Personal life ==
In September 2014, Niimi married the former manager of his university's baseball team, Ayaki, a woman one year his junior from Fukuoka Prefecture. He has two children, born in 2019 and 2021, respectively. Niimi is friends with Koki Ozora, a member of the House of Representatives for the Liberal Democratic Party since 2024. He is a fan of the Hanshin Tigers baseball team.

== Electoral history ==
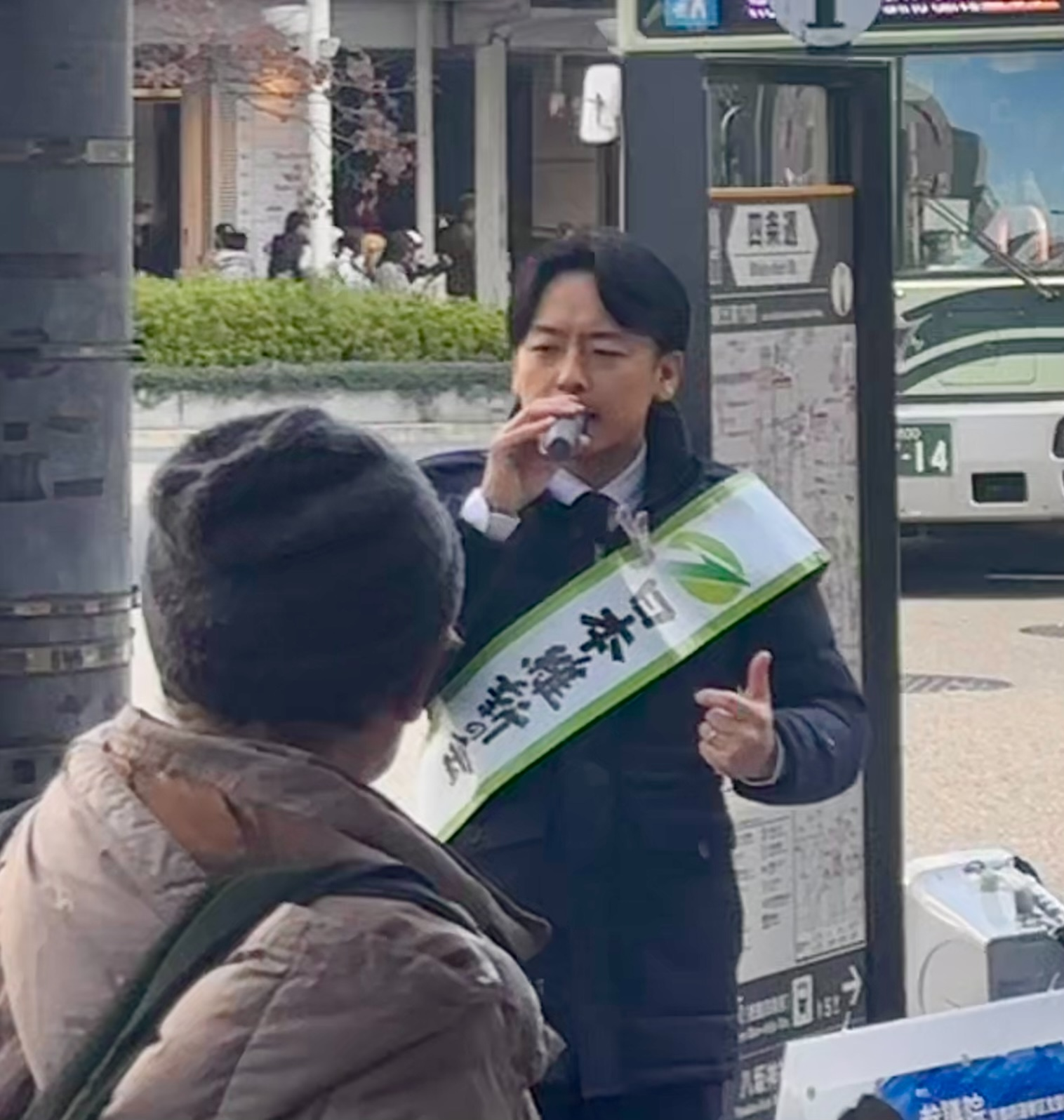
Niimi delivering a speech at Shijō Kawaramachi, December 2024.

Niimi won a seat in the House of Councillors in the 2025 election, representing Kyoto at-large.

2025
Party	Candidate	Votes	%	±%
Ishin	Shohei Niimi	332,523	28.1	
LDP	Shoji Nishida (Incumbent) (Endorsed by Komeito)	190,104	16.1%	
JCP	Akiko Kurabayashi	163,805	13.8%	
Sanseito	Aoto Taniguchi	142,371	12.0%	
Centrist Reform	Wakako Yamamoto	127,874	10.8%	
Turnout				

Senate
Preceded by Akiko Kurabayashi	Senator for Kyoto at-large district 2025–present	Incumbent
Party political offices
Preceded by Office established	Director of Student Affairs Bureau (Secretary), Japan Innovation Party; 2025-present	Incumbent
