= Hiroyuki Nagahama =

Japanese politician (born 1958)

- 長浜 博行
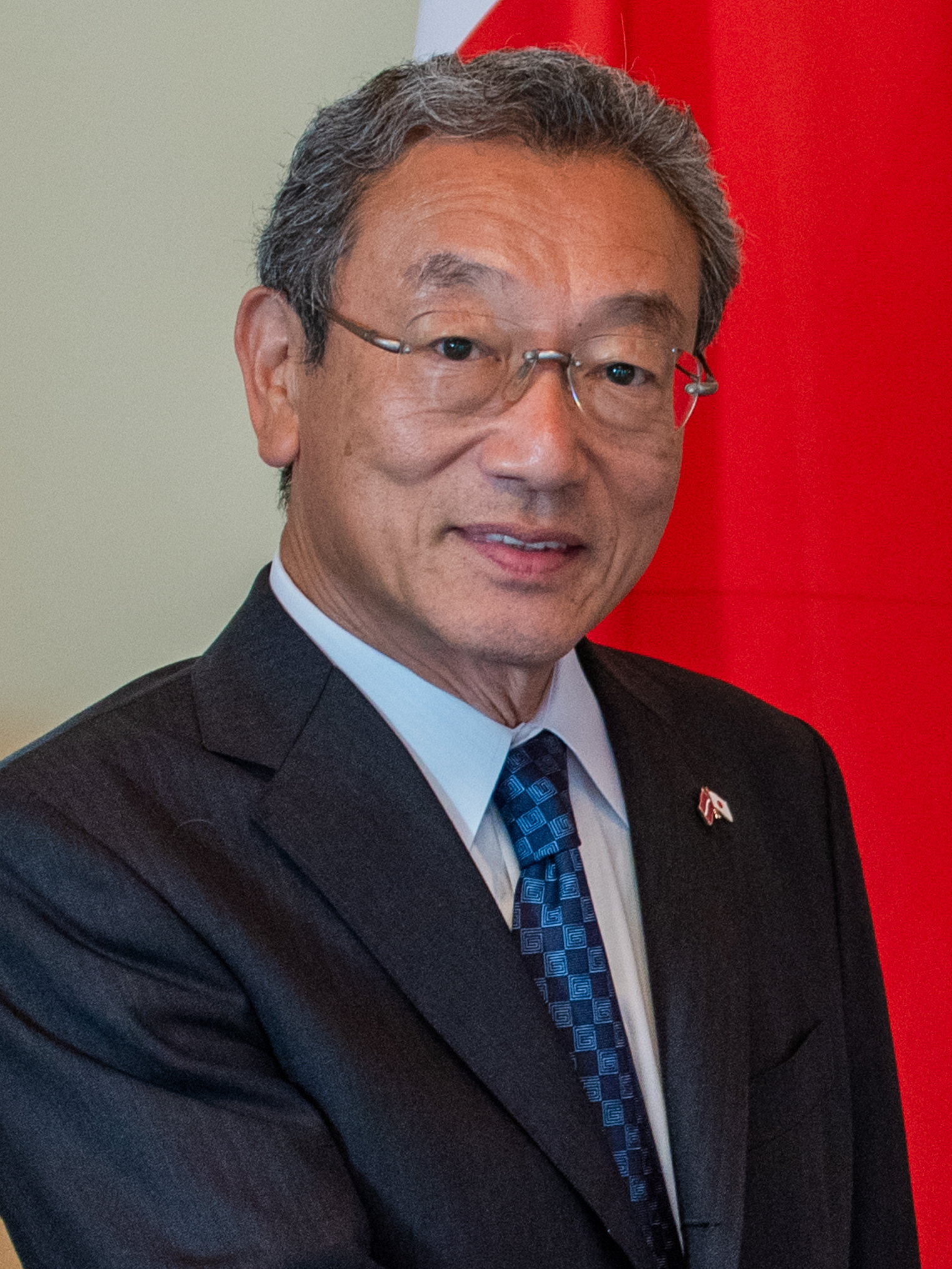
- Nagahama in 2023

Vice President of the House of Councillors
- In office 3 August 2022 – 1 August 2025
- President: Hidehisa Otsuji; Masakazu Sekiguchi
- Preceded by: Toshio Ogawa
- Succeeded by: Tetsuro Fukuyama

Minister of the Environment
- In office 1 October 2012 – 26 December 2012
- Prime Minister: Yoshihiko Noda
- Preceded by: Goshi Hosono
- Succeeded by: Nobuteru Ishihara

Deputy Chief Cabinet Secretary (Political affairs, House of Councillors)
- In office 2 September 2011 – 1 October 2012
- Prime Minister: Yoshihiko Noda
- Preceded by: Tetsuro Fukuyama
- Succeeded by: Hirokazu Shiba

Member of the House of Councillors
- Incumbent
- Assumed office 29 July 2007
- Preceded by: Akira Imaizumi
- Constituency: Chiba at-large

Member of the House of Representatives; from Southern Kanto
- In office 26 June 2000 – 12 July 2007
- Preceded by: Yoshitaka Sakurada
- Succeeded by: Hirohisa Fujii
- Constituency: Chiba 8th (2000–2003); PR block (2003–2007)
- In office 19 July 1993 – 27 September 1996
- Preceded by: Katsuo Shinmura
- Succeeded by: Constituency abolished
- Constituency: Chiba 4th

Personal details
- Born: 20 October 1958 (age 67) Sumida, Tokyo, Japan
- Party: CDP (since 2018)
- Other political affiliations: JNP (1993–1994); NFP (1994–1998); DPJ (1998–2016); DP (2016–2018); DPP (2018)
- Education: Waseda University

Hiroyuki Nagahama (長浜 博行, Nagahama Hiroyuki; born 20 October 1958) is a Japanese politician of the Constitutional Democratic Party of Japan, who served as vice president of the House of Councillors from 2022 to 2025.

== Biography ==
A native of Tokyo and graduate of Waseda University, Nagahama was elected to the House of Representatives for the first time in 1993 as a member of Morihiro Hosokawa's Japan New Party. After losing his seat in 1996 as a member of the New Frontier Party, he was elected again in 2000 as a member of DPJ. In 2007, he was elected to the House of Councillors for the first time.

In 2012, Nagahama was appointed the Minister of the Environment.

After the 2022 House of Councillors election, Nagahama was elected vice president of the House of Councillors. After his term ended after the 2025 House of Councillors election, he was elected chairman of the Commission on the Constitution in the House of Councillors.

House of Councillors
Preceded by Hirofumi Nakasone	Chairman of the Commission on the Constitution; 2025–present	Incumbent
Preceded by Toshio Ogawa	Vice President of the House of Councillors; 2022–2025	Succeeded by Tetsuro Fukuyama
Political offices
Preceded by Goshi Hosono	Minister of the Environment; 2012	Succeeded by Nobuteru Ishihara
Preceded by Tetsuro Fukuyama	Deputy Chief Cabinet Secretary (Political affairs, House of Councillors); 2011–2012	Succeeded by Hirokazu Shiba
Party political offices
Preceded by Tetsuro Fukuyama	Chairman of the Constitutional Democratic Party in the House of Councillors; 2019–2020	Succeeded by Shunichi Mizuoka
