= Koichi Hirata =

Japanese politician (born 1948)

- 平田 耕一
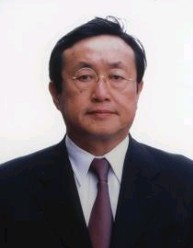
- Official portrait, 2004

Member of the House of Representatives
- In office 10 November 2003 – 21 July 2009
- Constituency: Tōkai PR

Member of the House of Councillors
- In office 25 July 1995 – 12 May 2000
- Preceded by: Tetsuo Inoue
- Succeeded by: Chiaki Takahashi
- Constituency: Mie at-large

Personal details
- Born: 9 November 1948 (age 77) Yokkaichi, Mie, Japan
- Party: Liberal Democratic
- Education: Keio University

Koichi Hirata (平田 耕一, Hirata Kōichi; born 9 November 1948) is a former Japanese politician of the Liberal Democratic Party (LDP), who served as a member of the House of Councillors and the House of Representatives in the Diet (national legislature). A native of Yokkaichi, Mie and graduate of Keio University, he was elected to the House of Councillors for the first time in 1995 as an independent. After losing his seat in 2000, he was elected to the House of Representatives in 2003 and represented Mie Prefecture until 2009.
