= Shoji Nishida =

Japanese politician

- 西田 昌司
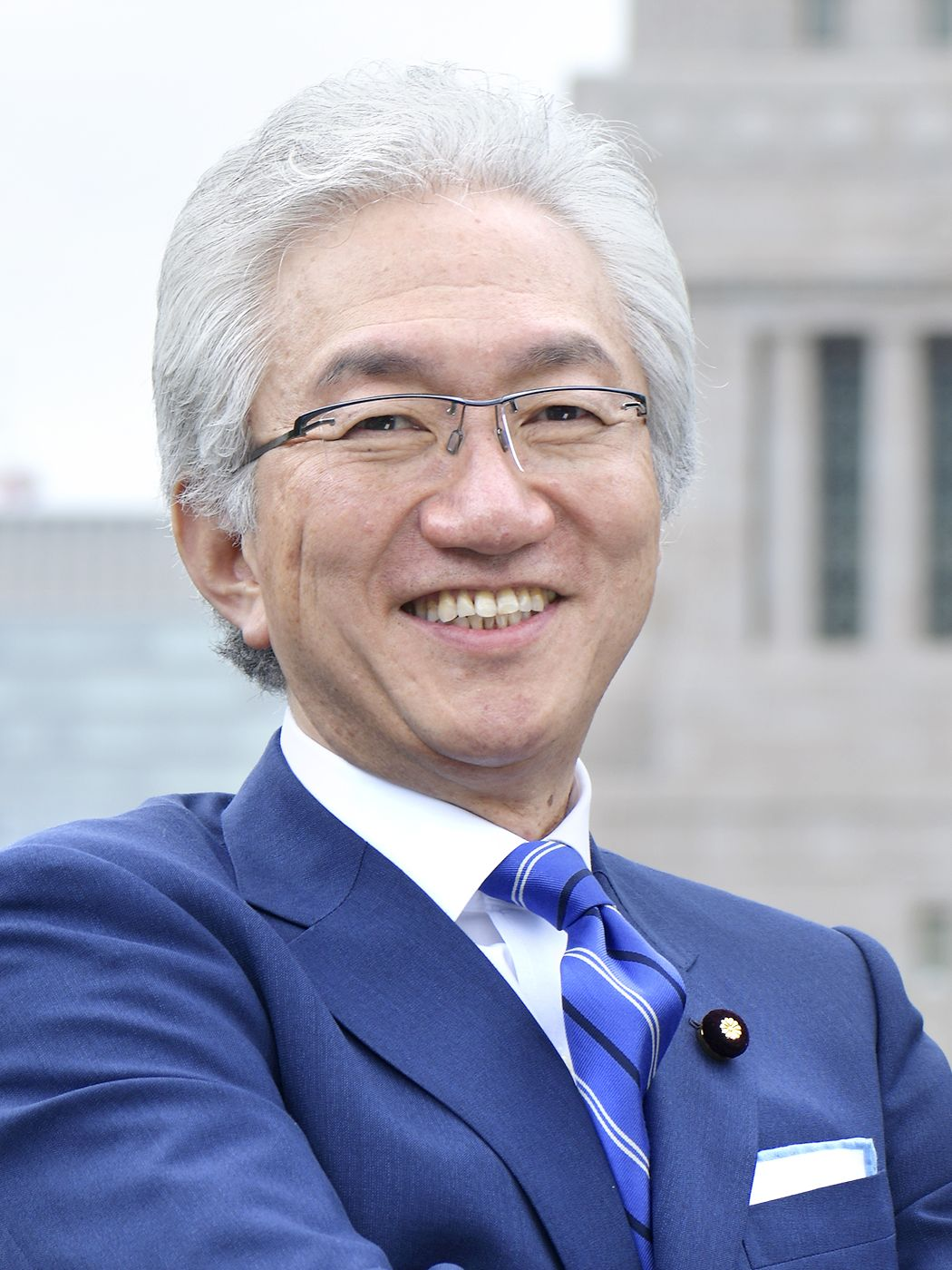
- Nishida in 2018

Member of the House of Councillors
- Incumbent
- Assumed office 29 July 2007
- Preceded by: Yoshihiro Nishida
- Constituency: Kyoto at-large

Member of the Kyoto Prefectural Assembly
- In office 1990–2007
- Constituency: Minami Ward

Personal details
- Born: 19 September 1958 (age 68) Minami, Kyoto, Japan
- Party: Liberal Democratic
- Parent: Yoshihiro Nishida (father)
- Education: Shiga University

Shoji Nishida (西田 昌司, Nishida Shōji; born September 19, 1958) is a conservative Japanese politician of the Liberal Democratic Party, a member of the House of Councillors in the Diet (national legislature).

== Early life and education ==
Nishida was born in Kyoto Prefecture on 19 September 1958. He graduated from Shiga University in 1981, became a certified public tax accountant by passing the Licensed Tax Accountant Examination in 1984.

== Political career ==
Nishida was elected to the House of Councillors for the first time in 2007 after serving in the assembly of Kyoto Prefecture since 1990.

In early 2011, he was involved in a political scandal, revealing information that forced Seiji Maehara to resign.

He is associated with Japanese nationalist groups, such as Ganbare Nihon. Recently, he accused Prime Minister Yoshihiko Noda of affiliation with South Korea.

He became the chairman of Special Committee on Nuclear Power Issues in 2014 and the chairman of Special Committee on Regional Issues and Consumer Affairs in the House of Councillors.
