= Osaka Shin-Ai Gakuin =

Private school in Jōtō-ku, Osaka, Japan

Coordinates: 34.7111°N 135.5585°E

- 大阪信愛学院
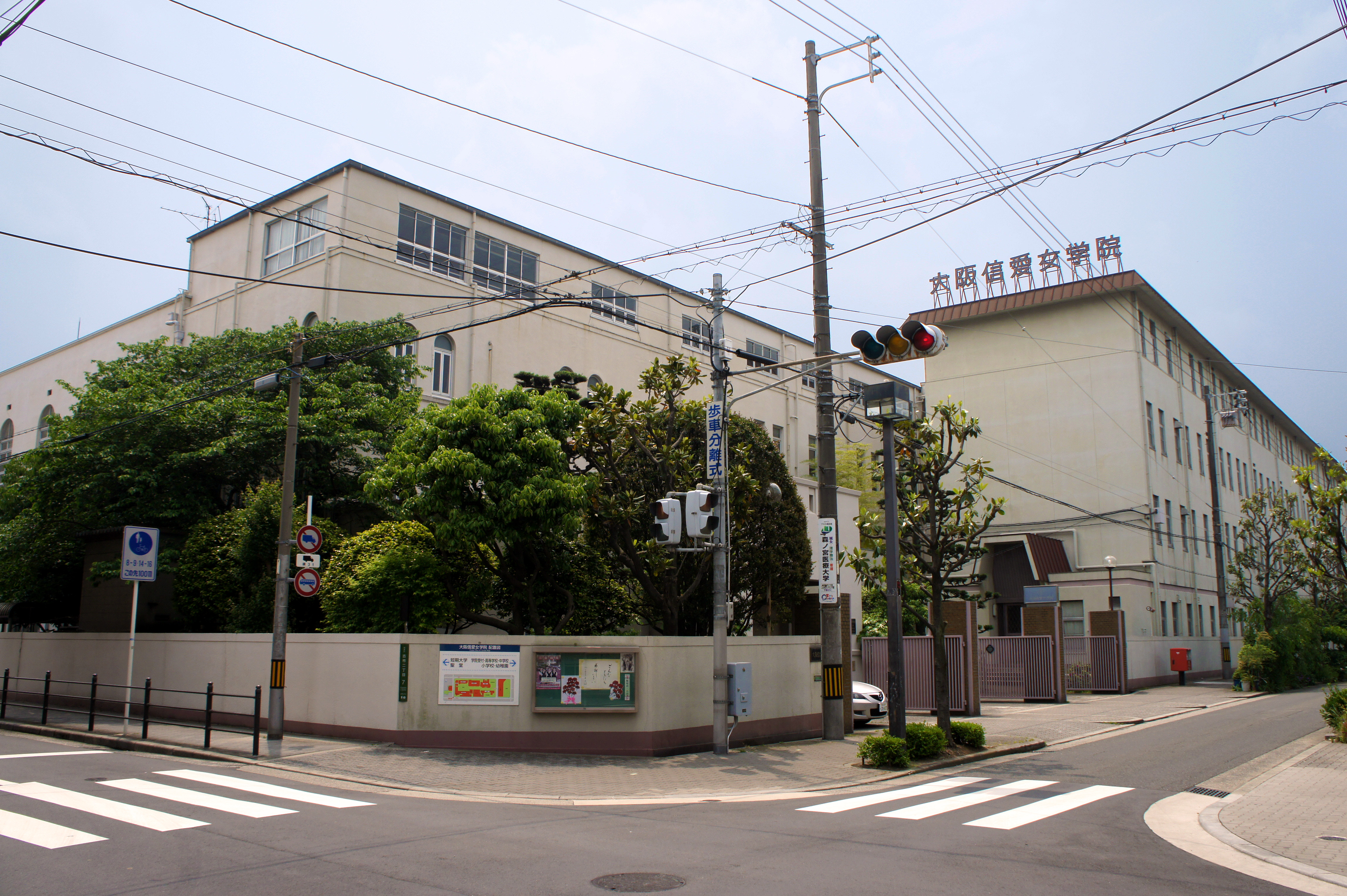
- The school in 2012

Information
- Religious affiliation: Catholicism
- Established: 1884; 142 years ago
- Website: www.osaka-shinai.ac.jp

Osaka Shin-Ai Gakuin (大阪信愛学院, Ōsaka Shin'ai Gakuin) is a private girls' preschool through senior high school in Jōtō-ku, Osaka.

It is affiliated with Osaka Shin-ai College.

Takenaka Corporation built a chapel on the school campus in 2004.

== Notable alumnae ==
- Yoshie Ōishi - politician
- Katsuyo Kobayashi - chef
