= Sadakazu Tanigaki =

Japanese politician (born 1945)

- 谷垣 禎一
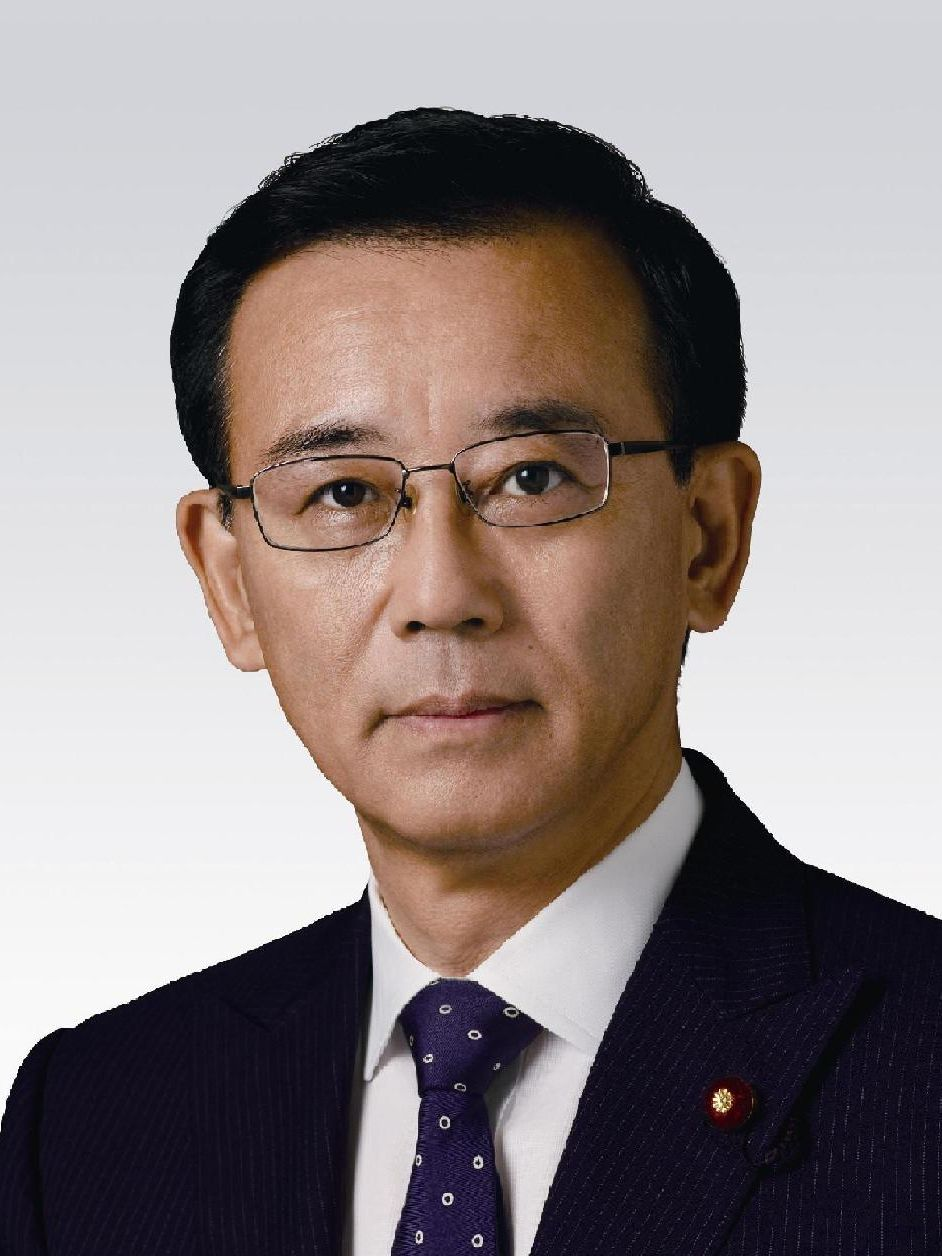
- Official portrait, 2009

President of the Liberal Democratic Party
- In office 28 September 2009 – 26 September 2012
- Vice President: Tadamori Ōshima
- Secretary-General: Tadamori Ōshima; Nobuteru Ishihara
- Preceded by: Tarō Asō
- Succeeded by: Shinzo Abe
Ministerial offices
Minister of Justice
In office 26 December 2012 – 3 September 2014
Prime Minister	Shinzo Abe
Preceded by	Makoto Taki
Succeeded by	Midori Matsushima
Minister of Land, Infrastructure, Transport and Tourism
In office 2 August 2008 – 24 September 2008
Prime Minister	Yasuo Fukuda
Preceded by	Tetsuzo Fuyushiba
Succeeded by	Nariaki Nakayama
Minister of Finance
In office 22 September 2003 – 26 September 2006
Prime Minister	Junichiro Koizumi
Preceded by	Masajuro Shiokawa
Succeeded by	Kōji Omi
Chairman of the National Public Safety Commission
In office 30 September 2002 – 22 September 2003
Prime Minister	Junichiro Koizumi
Preceded by	Jin Murai
Succeeded by	Kiyoko Ono
Chairman of the Financial Reconstruction Commission
In office 25 February 2000 – 4 July 2000
Prime Minister	Keizō Obuchi; Yoshirō Mori
Preceded by	Michio Ochi
Succeeded by	Kimitaka Kuze
Director-General of the Science and Technology Agency
In office 11 September 1997 – 30 July 1998
Prime Minister	Ryutaro Hashimoto
Preceded by	Riichirō Chikaoka
Succeeded by	Yutaka Takeyama
Party political offices
Secretary-General of the Liberal Democratic Party
In office 3 September 2014 – 3 August 2016
President	Shinzo Abe
Vice President	Masahiko Kōmura
Preceded by	Shigeru Ishiba
Succeeded by	Toshihiro Nikai

Member of the House of Representatives
- In office 8 August 1983 – 28 September 2017
- Preceded by: Sen'ichi Tanigaki
- Succeeded by: Tarō Honda
- Constituency: Kyoto 2nd (1983–1996); Kyoto 5th (1996–2017)

Personal details
- Born: 7 March 1945 (age 81) Fukuchiyama, Kyoto, Japan
- Party: Liberal Democratic
- Parent: Sen'ichi Tanigaki (father)
- Education: Azabu High School
- Alma mater: University of Tokyo
- Website: Official website

Sadakazu Tanigaki (谷垣 禎一, Tanigaki Sadakazu; born 7 March 1945) is a Japanese politician who served as a member of the House of Representatives from 1983 to 2017, as Minister of Finance from 2003 to 2006, as President of the Liberal Democratic Party and Leader of the Opposition from 2009 to 2012, as Minister of Justice from 2012 to 2014, and as LDP Secretary-General from 2014 to 2016. He was only the second LDP leader who was not simultaneously Prime Minister of Japan. He retired from politics following a spinal cord injury in 2016 that saw him using a wheelchair.

== Early life and education ==
Tanigaki was born in Fukuchiyama on 7 March 1945. He attended Azabu High School. He graduated from the faculty of law at the University of Tokyo in 1974, and worked as a secretary for his father, who was the then minister of education. He went on to pass the Japanese bar examination in 1979, specializing in tax law, and he registered as an attorney in 1982 after completing his legal training.

== Political career ==
Tanigaki was prepared for a legal career after close to ten years of study, but his father, who represented the 2nd district in Kyoto, died in 1983. Tanigaki moved to Kyoto to run for his father's seat. He briefly headed the Science and Technology Agency in 1997. Under the then prime minister Koizumi, he served in a number of positions, including the Financial Reconstruction Commission, the National Public Safety Commission, and ultimately as Minister of Finance from 22 September 2003 to 26 September 2006. Since 2002, Tanigaki has led a minor faction in the Liberal Democratic Party, formerly part of the Kōchikai faction, with 11 members in the lower house and 4 in the upper house.

Tanigaki declared his candidacy for the LDP presidency on 28 July 2006, but came in third place in a three-way race against Shinzo Abe and Tarō Asō. Tanigaki was viewed as the "moderate" candidate in the race, mainly due to his foreign policy views: unlike Abe and Asō, he stated that he would not continue visits to Yasukuni Shrine if he became prime minister, which made him a more attractive candidate among LDP leaders who sought better relations with Chinese and Korean leadership. Tanigaki is affiliated to the openly revisionist lobby Nippon Kaigi, which advocates visits of Prime Ministers to the controversial shrine.

On 24 September 2007, Tanigaki was named chief policymaker of the LDP by newly elected party president Yasuo Fukuda. He was subsequently appointed as Minister of Land, Infrastructure, Transport and Tourism on 1 August 2008.

=== Opposition leader (2009–2012) ===
On 28 September 2009, he was elected by his party as LDP leader to replace former prime minister Tarō Asō after the Democratic Party of Japan achieved a landslide election result in the 2009 general election and took government from the LDP.

In the early period of the Democratic Party of Japan government, Tanigaki frequently condemned the DPJ for advocating for a rise in the sales taxes by 5 percent, in spite of the enormous, problematic national deficit, and despite his own past calls to increase the tax.

To gain a potential legislative LDP-coalition majority, he attempted an unsuccessful no-confidence motion against Naoto Kan in June 2011, after refusing Kan's earlier offers of a grand coalition.

In 2012, the LDP under Tanigaki worked with prime minister Yoshihiko Noda of the ruling DPJ to pass an increase in the consumption tax from the current 5% to 8% in April 2014 and 10% in October 2015. He agreed not to introduce a no-confidence motion or a censure motion against Noda, in return for Noda's promise to hold elections "soon." On 28 August 2012, soon after the consumption tax bills were passed through the diet a censure motion was passed by the LDP and the New Komeito Party against Prime Minister Noda. The opposition parties were to boycott debate in the chamber, meaning that new bills passed in the DPJ-controlled House of Representatives could not be enacted.

Tanigaki had expected to be re-elected as LDP head unopposed in 2012, but former Prime Minister Shinzo Abe and several others suggested that they could run against him. He lost the party election to Abe on 26 September 2012. As a result, he became only the second LDP leader, after Yōhei Kōno (1993–1995), who never served as Prime Minister.

=== Abe government (2012–2016) ===
Following the LDP's victory in the 2012 general election, Abe appointed his three rivals from the LDP leadership contest to cabinet posts, with Tanigaki serving as Minister of Justice.

Abe appointed Tanigaki to serve as LDP Secretary-General in September 2014, placing Tanigaki in charge of the party's campaign strategy. In this post, Tanigaki continued to have weekly meetings with Abe, in which he provided constructive criticism of Abe's policy agenda. He agreed not to stand against Abe in the 2015 LDP leadership election despite their intense personal rivalry and differing political philosophies.

=== Injury and retirement ===
Tanigaki injured his spinal cord in a bicycle accident in July 2016, and remained hospitalized as of September 2017. He stayed out of the public eye during his hospitalization, and was rumored to be planning a comeback to politics as of mid-2017, but decided not to run in the 2017 general election due to his physical condition. He made his first public appearance after the accident in October 2018, and addressed the Liberal Democratic Party Convention from a wheelchair in February 2019. The LDP approached him to run in the 2019 House of Councillors election, but he turned down the request, stating that he would focus on his rehabilitation.

== Honours ==
- Japan:
  - Grand Cordon of the Order of the Rising Sun (2019)

== Election history ==
Election	Age	District	Political party	Number of votes	election results
1983 bye-election	38	Kyoto 2nd district	LDP	125,209	winning
1983 Japanese general election	38	Kyoto 2nd district	LDP	125,446	winning
1986 Japanese general election	41	Kyoto 2nd district	LDP	137,705	winning
1990 Japanese general election	44	Kyoto 2nd district	LDP	153,786	winning
1993 Japanese general election	48	Kyoto 2nd district	LDP	118,019	winning
1996 Japanese general election	51	Kyoto 5th district	LDP	91,146	winning
2000 Japanese general election	55	Kyoto 5th district	LDP	109,508	winning
2003 Japanese general election	58	Kyoto 5th district	LDP	103,486	winning
2005 Japanese general election	60	Kyoto 5th district	LDP	107,792	winning
2009 Japanese general election	64	Kyoto 5th district	LDP	87,998	winning
2012 Japanese general election	67	Kyoto 5th district	LDP	87,879	winning
2014 Japanese general election	69	Kyoto 5th district	LDP	76,733	winning

Political offices
Preceded by Riichirō Chikaoka	Director General of the Science and Technology Agency; 1997–1998	Succeeded by Yutaka Takeyama
Preceded by Michio Ochi	Chairman of the Financial Reconstruction Commission; 2000	Succeeded by Kimitaka Kuze
Preceded by Jin Murai	Chairman of the National Public Safety Commission; 2002–2003	Succeeded by Kiyoko Ono
New ministerial post	Minister of State for Food Safety; 2003	Succeeded by Kiyoko Ono
Preceded by Masajuro Shiokawa	Minister of Finance; 2003–2006	Succeeded by Kōji Omi
Preceded by Tetsuzo Fuyushiba	Minister of Land, Infrastructure, Transport and Tourism; 2008	Succeeded by Nariaki Nakayama
Preceded by Makoto Taki	Minister of Justice; 2012–2014	Succeeded by Midori Matsushima
Party political offices
Preceded by Nobuteru Ishihara	Chairman of the Policy Research Council, Liberal Democratic Party; 2007-2008	Succeeded by Kosuke Hori
Preceded by Tarō Asō	President of the Liberal Democratic Party; 2009–2012	Succeeded by Shinzo Abe
Preceded by Shigeru Ishiba	Secretary-General of the Liberal Democratic Party; 2014–2016	Succeeded by Toshihiro Nikai
