= Akio Sato (politician, born 1927) =

Japanese politician (1927–2007)

- 佐藤 昭夫

Member of the House of Councillors
- In office 11 July 1977 – 22 July 1989
- Preceded by: Hanji Ogawa (1974)
- Succeeded by: Teiko Sasano
- Constituency: Kyoto at-large

Personal details
- Born: 15 August 1927 Nagoya, Aichi, Japan
- Died: 23 October 2007 (aged 80) Uji, Kyoto, Japan
- Party: Communist
- Education: Kyoto University

Akio Sato (佐藤 昭夫, Satō Akio; 15 August 1927 – 23 October 2007) was a Japanese politician. He represented the Kyoto at-large district in the House of Councillors of the Diet of Japan, serving two terms from 1977 until 1989 as a member of the Japanese Communist Party. Sato was born in Nagoya, Aichi Prefecture and graduated from the Department of Science at the University of Kyoto. He was employed as a high school teacher before entering politics. He died of pneumonia in Uji, Kyoto at the age of 80 on 23 October 2007.
