= Tetsuro Fukuyama =

Japanese politician (born 1962)

Tetsurō Fukuyama
- 福山 哲郎
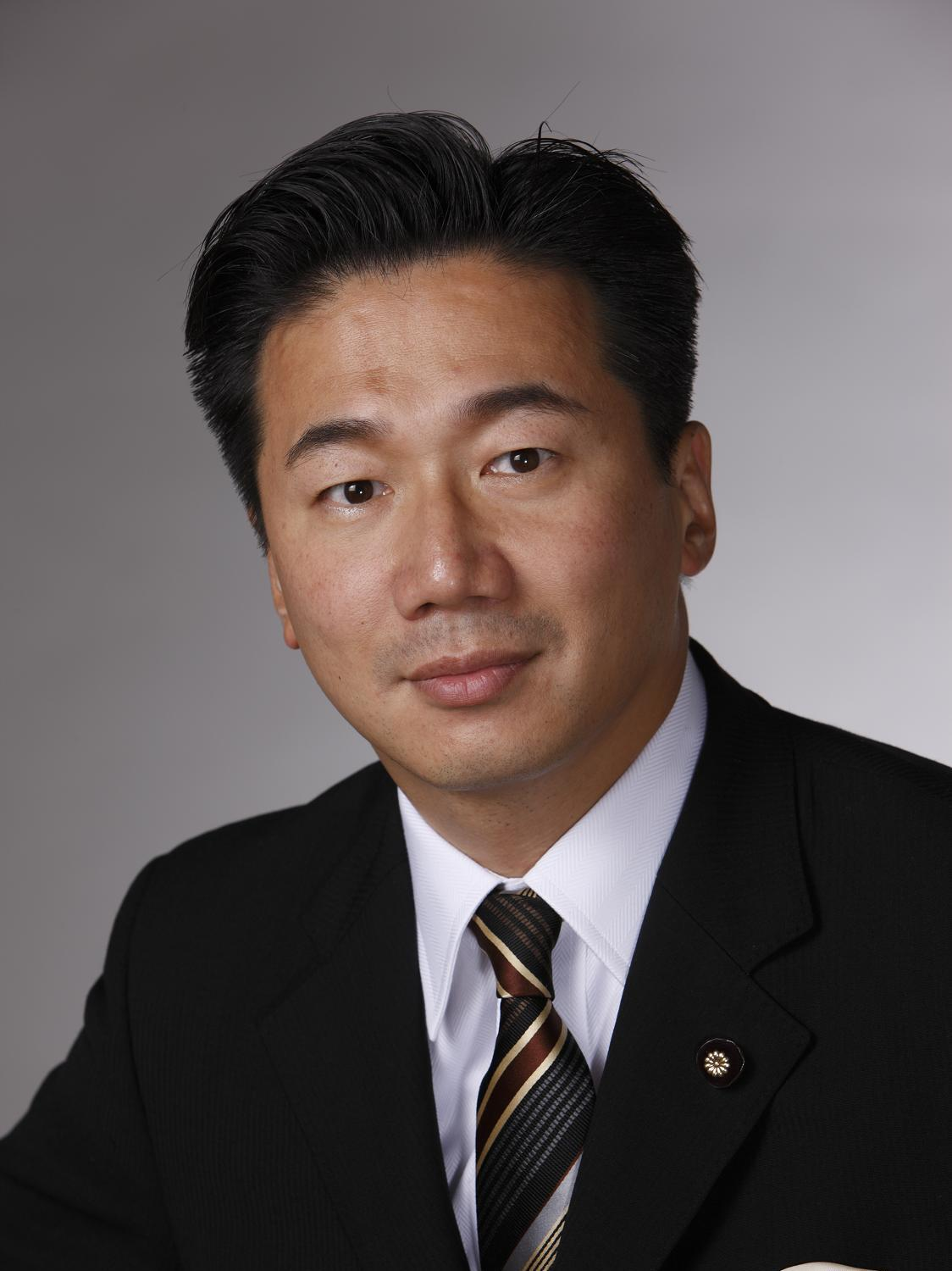
- Official portrait, 2009

Vice President of the Senate
- Incumbent
- Assumed office 1 August 2025
- President: Masakazu Sekiguchi
- Preceded by: Hiroyuki Nagahama

Deputy Chief Cabinet Secretary (Political affairs, House of Councillors)
- In office 8 June 2010 – 2 September 2011
- Prime Minister: Naoto Kan
- Preceded by: Koji Matsui
- Succeeded by: Hiroyuki Nagahama

Senator
- Incumbent
- Assumed office 26 July 1998
- Preceded by: Yukio Hayashida
- Constituency: Kyoto at-large

Personal details
- Born: Fukuyama Tetsurō (福山 哲郎); 19 January 1962 (age 64) Tokyo, Japan
- Party: CDP (since 2017)
- Other political affiliations: DP 1996 (1996–1998); DPJ (1998–2016); DP 2016 (2016–2017)
- Education: Doshisha University; Kyoto University
- Website: Official website

Tetsuro Fukuyama (福山 哲郎, Fukuyama Tetsurō; born January 19, 1962) is a politician of the Constitutional Democratic Party of Japan, a member of the Senate in the Diet (national legislature).

== Early life ==
A native of Tokyo, Fukuyama graduated from Doshisha University and received a master's degree from Kyoto University.

== Political career ==
After running unsuccessfully for the House of Representatives in 1996, Fukuyama was elected to the Senate for the first time in 1998.

He was Deputy Chief Cabinet Secretary from June 2010 to September 2011 in the Kan government.

He was the secretary general of the CDP from September 2020 to December 2021. He currently serves as a member of the CDP “Next Cabinet” (Shadow Cabinet) as shadow minister of security.
