= Yukio Hayashida =

Japanese politician

- 林田 悠紀夫

Minister of Justice
- In office 6 November 1987 – 27 December 1988
- Prime Minister: Noboru Takeshita
- Preceded by: Kaname Endō
- Succeeded by: Takashi Hasegawa

Governor of Kyoto Prefecture
- In office 16 April 1978 – 15 April 1986
- Monarch: Hirohito
- Preceded by: Torazō Ninagawa
- Succeeded by: Teiichi Aramaki

Member of the House of Councillors
- In office 8 July 1986 – 25 July 1998
- Preceded by: Minoru Ueda
- Succeeded by: Tetsuro Fukuyama
- Constituency: Kyoto at-large
- In office 28 April 1966 – 25 March 1978
- Preceded by: Ōnogi Hidejirō
- Succeeded by: Minoru Ueda
- Constituency: Kyoto at-large

Personal details
- Born: 26 November 1915 Maizuru, Kyoto, Japan
- Died: 11 November 2007 (aged 91) Setagaya, Tokyo, Japan
- Party: Liberal Democratic
- Education: Tokyo Imperial University

Yukio Hayashida (林田 悠紀夫; 26 November 1915 – 11 November 2007) was a Japanese politician and former member of the House of Councillors. Hayashida served as the Governor of Kyoto from 16 April 1978 until 15 April 1986. He later became the Minister of Justice from 6 November 1987 to 27 December 1988.

Hayashida was born in Maizuru, Kyoto and died of heart failure at the age of 91 in Tokyo.
