= Mie at-large district =

Japan House of Councillors constituency

- 三重県選挙区
- Parliamentary constituency for the House of Councillors
- Prefecture: Mie
- Electorate: 1,460,720 (as of September 2022)

Current constituency
- Created: 1947
- Seats: 2
- Councillors: Class of 2022: Sachiko Yamamoto (LDP); Class of 2025: Tomoko Kojima (CDP)

Mie at-large district is a constituency in the House of Councillors of Japan, the upper house of the Diet of Japan (national legislature). It currently elects 2 members to the House of Councillors, 1 per election.

Mie, similar to other rural, 2-seat districts, is now an LDP stronghold. However, during the 90s and 00s, it showed a tendency to break towards the opposition; it elected independents, along with some members of the Democratic Party of Japan. However, with the Democratic Party's collapse throughout the mid-2010s, it began to trend away from the opposition. The last opposition member to serve the district was Hirokazu Shiba, who was narrowly re-elected in 2016 and did not run for re-election in 2022.

== Elected Councillors ==
Class of 1947	Election year	Class of 1950
(1947: 6-year term)	Election year	(1947: 3-year term)
Monjūro Kuki (Ind.)	1947	Saijiro Atake (Gakudōkai)
Monjūro Kuki (Ind.)	1950	Minoru Maeda (Ind.)
Hiroya Ino (Ryokufūkai)	1953	Minoru Maeda (Ind.)
Hiroya Ino (Ryokufūkai)	1955 by-el.	Noboru Saito (Ind.)
Hiroya Ino (Ryokufūkai)	1956	Noboru Saito (LDP)
Hiroya Ino (LDP)	1959	Noboru Saito (LDP)
Hiroya Ino (LDP)	1962	Noboru Saito (LDP)
Hiroya Ino (LDP)	1965	Noboru Saito (LDP)
Hiroya Ino (LDP)	1968	Noboru Saito (LDP)
Fujimaro Kubota (LDP)	1971	Noboru Saito (LDP)
Fujimaro Kubota (LDP)	1972 by-el.	Jūro Saito (LDP)
Fujimaro Kubota (LDP)	1974	Jūro Saito (LDP)
Tōgo Sakakura (Socialist)	1977	Jūro Saito (LDP)
Tōgo Sakakura (Socialist)	1980	Jūro Saito (LDP)
Tsutomu Mizutani (LDP)	1983	Jūro Saito (LDP)
Tsutomu Mizutani (LDP)	1986	Jūro Saito (LDP)
Testuo Inoue (Rengō no Kai)	1989	Jūro Saito (LDP)
Testuo Inoue (Rengō no Kai)	1992	Jūro Saito (LDP)
Koichi Hirata (Ind.)	1995	Jūro Saito (LDP)
Koichi Hirata (Ind.)	1998	Jūro Saito (Ind.)
Chiaki Takahashi (Ind.)	2000 by-el.	Jūro Saito (Ind.)
Chiaki Takahashi (Ind.)	2001	Jūro Saito (Ind.)
Chiaki Takahashi (Ind.)	2004	Hirokazu Shiba (Democratic)
Chiaki Takahashi (Democratic)	2007	Hirokazu Shiba (Democratic)
Chiaki Takahashi (Democratic)	2010	Hirokazu Shiba (Democratic)
Yūmi Yoshikawa (LDP)	2013	Hirokazu Shiba (Democratic)
Yūmi Yoshikawa (LDP)	2016	Hirokazu Shiba (DP)
Yūmi Yoshikawa (LDP)	2019	Hirokazu Shiba (DP)
Yūmi Yoshikawa (LDP)	2022	Sachiko Yamamoto (LDP)
Tomoko Kojima (CDP)	2025	Sachiko Yamamoto (LDP)

== Election results ==
2025
Party	Candidate	Votes	%	±%
CDP	Tomoko Kojima	339,940	40.58	
LDP	Yūmi Yoshikawa (Incumbent)	276,304	32.99	
Sanseitō	Seiko Nanba	202,436	24.17	
Anti-NHK	Hiroyuki Hashimoto	18,965	2.26	
Turnout				

2022
Party	Candidate	Votes	%	±%
LDP	Sachiko Yamamoto	403,630	53.44	
Independent	Masahide Yoshino	278,508	36.87	
Sanseitō	Tamae Horie	51,069	6.76	
Anti-NHK	Setsuyo Kadota	22,128	2.93	
Turnout				

2019
Party	Candidate	Votes	%	±%
LDP	Yūmi Yoshikawa (Incumbent)	379,339	50.27	
Independent	Masahide Yoshino	334,353	44.31	
Anti-NHK	Setsuyo Kadota	40,906	5.42	
Turnout				

2016
Party	Candidate	Votes	%	±%
Democratic	Hirokazu Shiba (Incumbent)	440,776	49.72	
LDP	Sachiko Yamamoto	420,929	47.48	
Happiness Realization	Noriko Nohara	24,871	2.81	
Turnout				

2013
Party	Candidate	Votes	%	±%
LDP	Yūmi Yoshikawa	373,035	44.23	
Democratic	Chiaki Takahashi (Incumbent)	317,261	37.62	
Restoration	Hirotsugu Fukao	70,779	8.39	
JCP	Tamihide Nakagawa	59,231	2.81	
Independent	Shintaro Ōtsu	14,858	1.76	
Happiness Realization	Shunsuke Ogawa	8,233	0.98	
Turnout				

2010
Party	Candidate	Votes	%	±%
Democratic	Hirokazu Shiba (Incumbent)	360,697	40.65	
LDP	Kohei Onozaki	293,502	33.08	
Your	Yukako Yahara	178,346	20.10	
JCP	Tamihide Nakagawa	54,806	6.18	
Turnout				

2007
Party	Candidate	Votes	%	±%
Democratic	Chiaki Takahashi (Incumbent)	527,935	59.37	
LDP	Kohei Onozaki	293,208	32.97	
JCP	Takeshi Nakano	68,058	7.65	
Turnout				

2004
Party	Candidate	Votes	%	±%
Democratic	Hirokazu Shiba	470,940	52.14	
LDP	Kenji Tsuda	370,748	41.05	
JCP	Takeshi Nakano	61,566	6.82	
Turnout				

2001
Party	Candidate	Votes	%	±%
Independent	Chiaki Takahashi (Incumbent)	397,105	46.45	
LDP	Kazumi Fujioka	372,065	43.52	
JCP	Miyoshi Taninaka	59,586	6.97	
Liberal League	Toru Ishitani	26,125	3.06	
Turnout				

2000 by-election
Party	Candidate	Votes	%	±%
Independent	Chiaki Takahashi	429,240	45.57	
LDP	Takako Hashizume	399,800	42.45	
JCP	Miyoshi Taninaka	112,875	11.98	
Turnout				

1998
Party	Candidate	Votes	%	±%
Independent	Jūro Saito (Incumbent)	389,400	45.77	
Independent	Chiaki Takahashi	289,953	34.08	
JCP	Kazuhisa Imai	131,948	15.51	
Liberal League	Tetsuyasu Sakamoto	39,445	4.64	
Turnout				

1995
Party	Candidate	Votes	%	±%
Independent	Koichi Hirata	303,453	46.91	
Minkairen	Tetsuo Inoue (Incumbent)	290,445	44.90	
JCP	Yoshikazu Hori	53,014	8.19	
Turnout				

1992
Party	Candidate	Votes	%	±%
LDP	Jūro Saito (Incumbent)	373,960	53.36	
Minkairen	Katsuyuki Kitaoka	272,804	38.92	
JCP	Yoshikazu Hori	54,113	7.72	
Turnout				

1989
Party	Candidate	Votes	%	±%
Minkairen	Tetsuo Inoue	452,239	52.59	
LDP	Tsutomu Mizutani (Incumbent)	343,078	39.89	
JCP	Miyoko Kōsaka	64,681	7.52	
Turnout				

1986
Party	Candidate	Votes	%	±%
LDP	Jūro Saito (Incumbent)	527,493	57.78	
Socialist	Hajime Takagi	293,124	32.11	
JCP	Kazuo Matsubara	92,352	10.12	
Turnout				

1983
Party	Candidate	Votes	%	±%
LDP	Tsutomu Mizutani	358,535	50.07	
Socialist	Tōgo Sakakura (Incumbent)	297,193	41.50	
JCP	Kazuo Matsubara	60,360	8.43	
Turnout				

1980
Party	Candidate	Votes	%	±%
LDP	Jūro Saito (Incumbent)	521,402	58.69	
Socialist	Hajime Takagi	264,392	29.76	
JCP	Kazuo Matsubara	102,597	11.55	
Turnout				

1977
Party	Candidate	Votes	%	±%
Socialist	Tōgo Sakakura	284,483	34.75	
LDP	Fujimaro Kubota (Incumbent)	282,342	34.48	
New Liberal Club	Satoru Tanaka	202,602	24.75	
JCP	Kazuo Matsubara	49,316	6.02	
Turnout				

1974
Party	Candidate	Votes	%	±%
LDP	Jūro Saito (Incumbent)	384,553	50.05	
Socialist	Tōgo Sakakura	207,703	27.03	
Komeito	Hiroshi Nagata	99,019	12.89	
JCP	Mikio Ida	77,025	10.03	
Turnout				

1972 by-election
Party	Candidate	Votes	%	±%
LDP	Jūro Saito	326,569	65.57	
Socialist	Toshio Shizunaga	117,268	23.54	
JCP	Masakazu Nakagawa	54,246	10.89	
Turnout				

1971
Party	Candidate	Votes	%	±%
LDP	Fujimaro Kubota	336,918	53.59	
Socialist	Saburo Tanaka	183,934	29.26	
JCP	Masakazu Nakagawa	107,830	17.15	
Turnout				

1968
Party	Candidate	Votes	%	±%
LDP	Noboru Saito (Incumbent)	421,325	61.34	
Socialist	Shigeyuki Fukushima	205,241	29.88	
JCP	Masakazu Nakagawa	60,270	8.78	
Turnout				

1965
Party	Candidate	Votes	%	±%
LDP	Hiroya Ino (Incumbent)	364,349	58.42	
Socialist	Fujitsugu Watanabe	221,785	35.56	
JCP	Hayao Ozaki	37,514	6.02	
Turnout				

1962
Party	Candidate	Votes	%	±%
LDP	Noboru Saito (Incumbent)	402,824	64.47	
Socialist	Hajime Takagi	194,585	31.14	
JCP	Masakazu Nakagawa	27,416	4.39	
Turnout				

1959
Party	Candidate	Votes	%	±%
LDP	Hiroya Ino (Incumbent)	301,733	56.63	
Socialist	Fujitsugu Watanabe	231,112	43.37	
Turnout				

1956
Party	Candidate	Votes	%	±%
LDP	Noboru Saito (Incumbent)	282,238	51.73	
Socialist	Takako Kikukawa	263,411	48.27	
Turnout				

1955 by-election
Party	Candidate	Votes	%	±%
Independent	Noboru Saito	218,750	62.03	
Left Socialist	Masaru Nishimura	133,921	37.97	
Turnout				

1953
Party	Candidate	Votes	%	±%
Ryokufūkai	Hiroya Ino	280,679	53.00	
Left Socialist	Hisa Sawada	150,501	28.42	
Right Socialist	Otoichi Ueda	98,384	18.58	
Turnout				

1950
Party	Candidate	Votes	%	±%
Independent	Minoru Maeda	274,995	49.49	
Ryokufūkai	Saijiro Atake (Incumbent)	146,456	26.36	
Independent	Mitsuru Ito	134,154	24.15	
Turnout				

1947
Party	Candidate	Votes	%	±%
Independent	Monjūro Kuki	139,394	30.75	
Gakudōkai	Saijiro Atake (term until 1950)	105,708	23.32	
Socialist	Hisashi Kondo	70,090	15.46	
Liberal	Masaru Shida	67,625	14.92	
Independent	Kazumi Nagaya	51,550	11.37	
JCP	Keiji Yanagawa	18,907	4.17	
Turnout				
