= Chiba 8th district =

Electoral constituency in Chiba Prefecture, Japan

- Parliamentary constituency for the Japanese House of Representatives
- Numbered map of the Chiba Prefecture single seats
- Prefecture: Chiba
- Proportional District: Southern Kanto
- Electorate: 360,783

Current constituency
- Created: 1994
- Seats: One
- Party: LDP
- Representatives: Izumi Matsumoto
- Municipalities: Kashiwa

Chiba 8th district (千葉県第8区, Chiba-ken dai-hakku or simply 千葉8区, Chiba-hakku) is a single-member constituency of the House of Representatives in the national Diet of Japan located in Chiba Prefecture.

== Areas covered ==
=== Since 2022 ===
- Kashiwa

=== 2013 - 2022 ===
- Part of Kashiwa
- Abiko

=== 2002 - 2013 ===
- Kashiwa
- Abiko

=== 1994 - 2002 ===
- Kashiwa
- Abiko
- Part of Higashi-Katsushika District
  - Shōnan area

== List of representatives ==
Election	Representative	Party	Notes
1996	Yoshitaka Sakurada	LDP	
2000	Hiroyuki Nagahama	Democratic	
2003	Kimiaki Matsuzaki	Democratic	
2005	Yoshitaka Sakurada	LDP	
2009	Kimiaki Matsuzaki	Democratic	
2012	Yoshitaka Sakurada	LDP	
2014	Yoshitaka Sakurada	LDP	
2017	Yoshitaka Sakurada	LDP	
2021	Satoshi Honjo	CDP	
2024	Satoshi Honjo	CDP	
2026	Izumi Matsumoto	LDP	

== Election results ==
=== 2026 ===
2026
Party	Candidate	Votes	%	±%
LDP	Izumi Matsumoto	95.279	49.1	▲16.8
Centrist Reform	Satoshi Honjō	62.784	32.3	▼10.6
Sanseitō	Hiroyuki Miyamoto	21,138	10.9	▲3.3
Ishin	Sadamichi Ishizuka	15,021	7.7	▼3.4
Registered electors		360,923		
Turnout			55.04	▲2.68
LDP gain from Centrist Reform				

=== 2024 ===
2024
Party	Candidate	Votes	%	±%
CDP	Satoshi Honjo (Incumbent)	78,678	42.93	▼16.72
LDP	Izumi Matsumoto	59,070	32.23	▼3.77
Ishin	Sadamichi Ishizuka	20,338	11.10	New
Sanseitō	Hiroyuki Miyamoto	13,872	7.57	New
JCP	Satoshi Takahashi	11,296	6.17	N/A
Majority		19,608	10.70	
Registered electors		360,412		
Turnout			52.36	▼3.80
CDP hold				

=== 2021 ===
2021
Party	Candidate	Votes	%	±%
CDP	Satoshi Honjo	135,125	59.65	New
LDP	Yoshitaka Sakurada (Incumbent) (Won PR seat)	81,556	36.00	▼12.76
Independent	Shinichiro Miyaoka	9,845	4.35	New
Majority		53,569	23.65	
Registered electors		423,866		
Turnout			56.16	▲4.48
CDP gain from LDP				

=== 2017 ===
2017
Party	Candidate	Votes	%	±%
LDP	Yoshitaka Sakurada (Incumbent)	100,115	48.76	▼0.44
Kibō no Tō	Kazumi Ota	71,468	34.81	New
JCP	Teiryo Onozato	33,752	16.43	▲0.40
Majority		28,647	13.95	
Registered electors		411,572		
Turnout			51.68	▼1.17
LDP hold				

=== 2014 ===
2014
Party	Candidate	Votes	%	±%
LDP	Yoshitaka Sakurada (Incumbent)	98,569	49.20	▲8.20
Innovation	Kazumi Ota (Won PR seat)	69,667	34.77	New
JCP	Teiryo Onozato	32,118	16.03	▲9.52
Majority		28,902	14.43	
Registered electors		396,160		
Turnout			52.85	▼7.41
LDP hold				

=== 2012 ===
2012
Party	Candidate	Votes	%	±%
LDP	Yoshitaka Sakurada	93,882	41.00	▲3.60
Democratic	Kimiaki Matsuzaki (Incumbent)	56,831	24.82	▼28.74
Your	Koji Yamamoto	44,532	19.45	New
Tomorrow	Yumiko Himei	18,846	8.23	New
JCP	Hidenori Takeishi	14,914	6.50	▼0.97
Majority		37,051	16.18	
Registered electors		393,127		
Turnout			60.26	▼7.42
LDP gain from Democratic				

=== 2009 ===
2009
Party	Candidate	Votes	%	±%
Democratic	Kimiaki Matsuzaki	138,923	53.56	▲13.57
LDP	Yoshitaka Sakurada (Incumbent)	97,007	37.40	▼14.47
JCP	Hideo Kato	19,378	7.47	▲0.78
Happiness Realization	Yasuko Mori	4,052	1.57	New
Majority		41,916	16.16	
Registered electors		391,010		
Turnout			67.68	▲0.73
Democratic gain from LDP				

=== 2005 ===
2005
Party	Candidate	Votes	%	±%
LDP	Yoshitaka Sakurada	128,659	51.87	▲7.50
Democratic	Kimiaki Matsuzaki (Incumbent)	99,204	39.99	▼6.77
JCP	Satoshi Takahashi	16,588	6.69	▼2.18
Independent	Yoichi Imai	3,614	1.45	New
Majority		29,455	11.88	
Registered electors		377,404		
Turnout			66.95	▲7.16
LDP gain from Democratic				

=== 2003 ===
2003
Party	Candidate	Votes	%	±%
Democratic	Kimiaki Matsuzaki	100,794	46.76	▲7.14
LDP	Yoshitaka Sakurada (Won PR seat)	95,627	44.37	▲6.12
JCP	Hideo Kato	19,117	8.87	▼1.22
Majority		5,167	2.39	
Registered electors		373,015		
Turnout			59.79	▲0.03
Democratic hold				

=== 2000 ===
2000
Party	Candidate	Votes	%	±%
Democratic	Hiroyuki Nagahama	91,220	39.62	New
LDP	Yoshitaka Sakurada (Incumbent) (Won PR seat)	88,065	38.25	▲4.25
JCP	Yasunori Takada	23,235	10.09	▼4.52
Social Democratic	Toshio Sasaki	21,429	9.31	New
Liberal League	Hidekazu Hayashi	6,294	2.73	▲1.62
Majority		3,155	1.37	
Registered electors		396,931		
Turnout			59.76	
Democratic gain from LDP				

=== 1996 ===
1996
Party	Candidate	Votes	%	±%
LDP	Yoshitaka Sakurada	69,539	34.00	New
New Frontier	Hiroyuki Nagahama	62,740	30.67	New
Democratic	Yukihiko Hayakawa	40,103	19.61	New
JCP	Hideo Kato	29,884	14.61	New
Liberal League	Hideyuki Matsumoto	2,284	1.11	New
Majority		6,799	3.33	
Registered electors				
Turnout				
LDP win (new seat)				
