= Osaka Shin-ai College =

Coordinates: 34°42′40.2″N 135°33′27.7″E

- 大阪信愛女学院短期大学
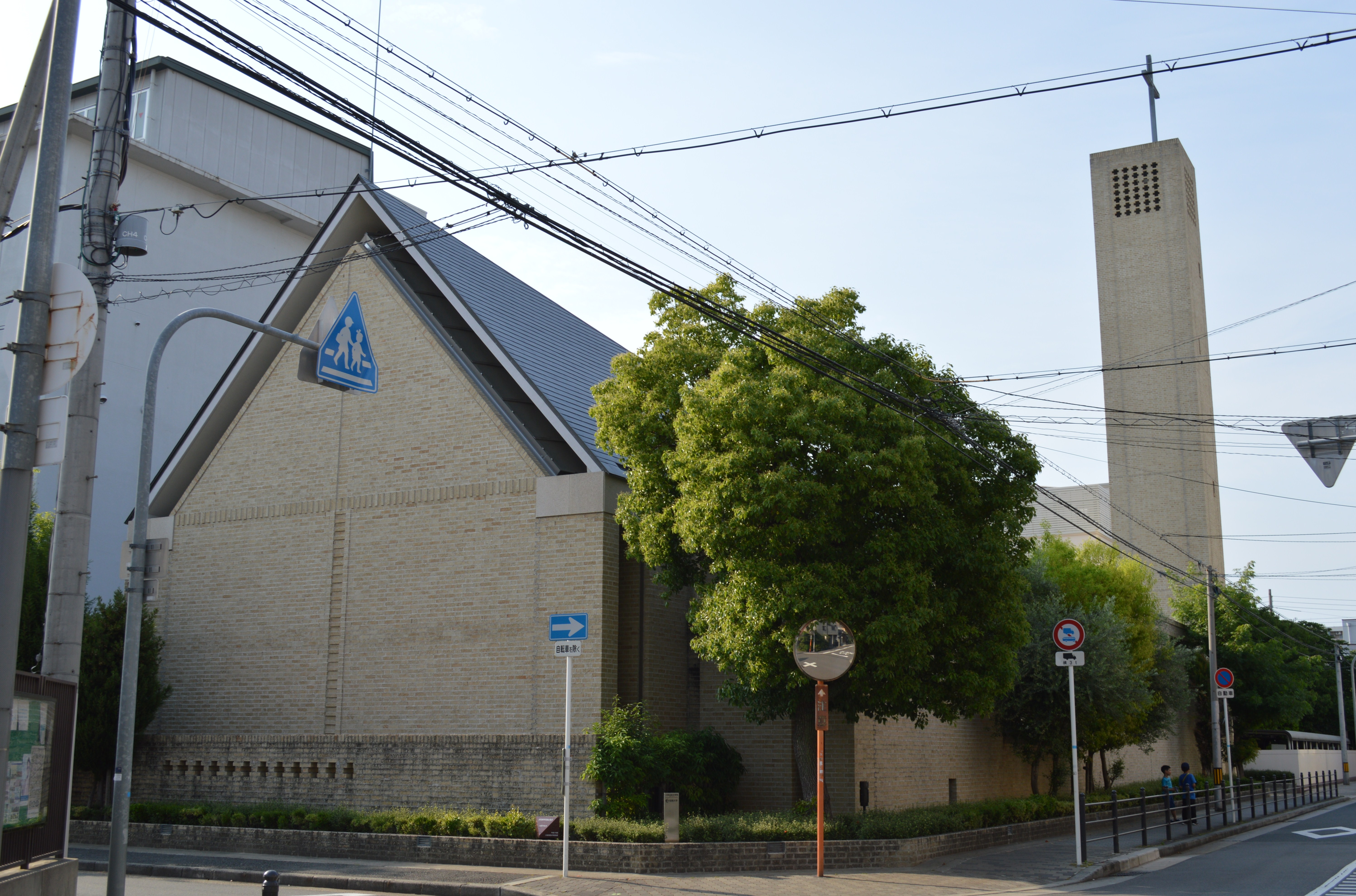
- Chapel
- Motto: ひとつの心、ひとつの魂
- Motto in English: One heart, One spirit
- Type: Private, Women's
- Established: 1884
- Founder: Marie Justine
- Affiliations: Osaka Shin-Ai Gakuin
- Religious affiliation: Catholic Church
- Location: Osaka, Japan
- Website: www.osaka-shinai.jp
- Location in Osaka Prefecture

Osaka Shin-ai College (大阪信愛女学院短期大学, Ōsaka shin'ai joshi tanki daigaku) is a private women's junior college with campuses in Joto-ku and Tsurumi-ku in Osaka, Osaka, Japan. The precursor of the school was founded in 1884, and it was chartered as a university in 1959.

It is affiliated with Osaka Shin-Ai Gakuin.
