= Chiaki Takahashi (politician) =

Japanese politician

- 高橋 千秋
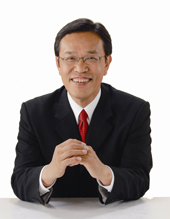

Member of the House of Councillors
- In office 26 June 2000 – 28 July 2013
- Preceded by: Koichi Hirata
- Succeeded by: Yūmi Yoshikawa
- Constituency: Mie at-large

Personal details
- Born: 2 August 1956 (age 70) Anō, Mie, Japan
- Party: DPP (since 2018)
- Other political affiliations: Independent (1998–2007); DPJ (2007–2016); DP (2016–2018)
- Education: Meiji University

Chiaki Takahashi (高橋 千秋, Takahashi Chiaki; born August 2, 1956) is a Japanese politician of the Democratic Party of Japan, a member of the House of Councillors in the Diet (national legislature). A native of Anō, Mie and graduate of Meiji University, he was elected to the House of Councillors for the first time in 2000 after running unsuccessfully for the House of Representatives in 1998.
