= Mai Ohara =

Japanese politician (born 1974)

- 小原 舞

Member of the Kyoto Prefectural Assembly
- Incumbent
- Assumed office 2015
- Constituency: Maizuru City

Member of the House of Representatives
- In office 30 August 2009 – 16 November 2012
- Constituency: Kinki PR

Personal details
- Born: 10 July 1974 (age 52) Maizuru, Kyoto, Japan
- Party: Independent
- Other political affiliations: Democratic (2009–2015)
- Education: Kwansei Gakuin University; Kyoto University
- Website: http://oharamai.jp

Military service
- Allegiance: Japan
- Branch/service: Japan Maritime Self-Defense Force

Mai Ohara (小原 舞, Ohara Mai; born 10 July 1974) is a Japanese politician who served in the House of Representatives of Japan.

== Biography ==
Born in Maizuru, Ohara joined the Japan Maritime Self-Defense Force after graduating from high school, and graduated from Kwansei Gakuin University in 1999. She earned a master's degree from Kyoto University in 2007.

In 2009, she was elected to the House of Representatives as a Liberal Democratic Party representative of Kyoto 5th district. On June 26, 2012, during a vote on social security and integrated tax reform legislation, she was one of eleven representatives who urged Prime Minister Yoshihiko Noda to vote against the opposing Democratic Party representatives.

In 2015, she was elected to the Kyoto Prefectural Assembly for Maizuru; she is the assembly's first female member to represent that constituency. In 2019, she placed second place in the election with 0,836, with Masayoshi Ikeda ahead of her.
