= Hirokazu Shiba =

Japanese politician (1950–2025)

- 芝 博一
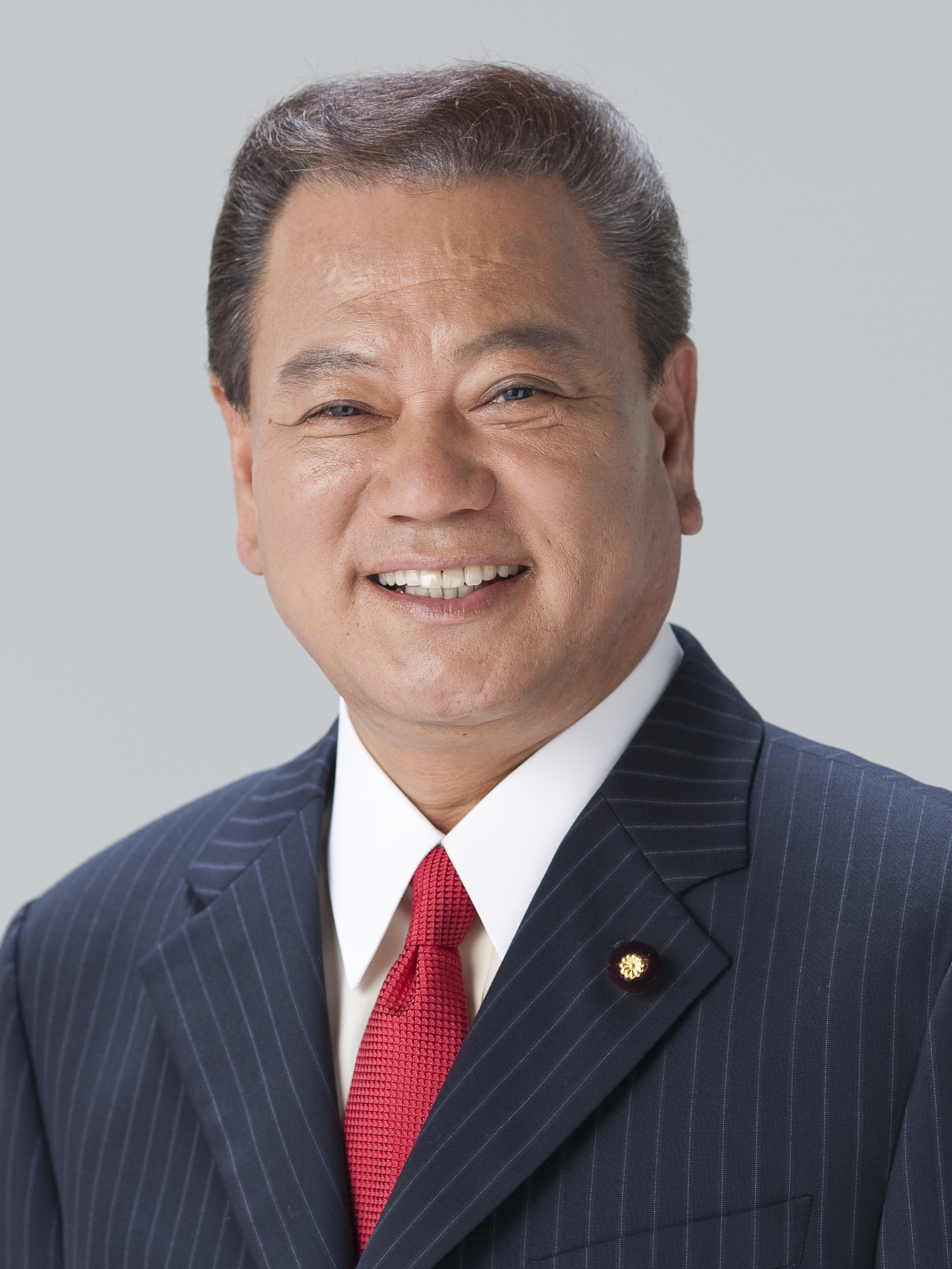
- Official portrait, 2009

Deputy Chief Cabinet Secretary (Political affairs, House of Councillors)
- In office 1 October 2012 – 26 December 2012
- Prime Minister: Yoshihiko Noda
- Preceded by: Hiroyuki Nagahama
- Succeeded by: Hiroshige Sekō

Member of the House of Councillors
- In office 26 July 2004 – 25 July 2022
- Preceded by: Jūrō Saitō
- Succeeded by: Sachiko Yamamoto
- Constituency: Mie at-large

Member of the Mie Prefectural Assembly
- In office 1995–2004
- Constituency: Suzuka City

Personal details
- Born: 21 April 1950 Nabari, Mie, Japan
- Died: 15 November 2025 (aged 75)
- Party: CDP (since 2018)
- Other political affiliations: Independent (1995–2004); DPJ (2004–2016); DP (2016–2018)
- Education: Kogakkan University

Hirokazu Shiba (芝 博一, Shiba Hirokazu; 21 April 1950 – 15 November 2025) was a Japanese politician of the Democratic Party of Japan, who was a member of the House of Councillors in the Diet, the country's national legislature.

== Life and career ==
A native of Nabari, Mie and graduate of Kogakkan University, he was elected to the House of Councillors for the first time in 2004 after serving the assembly of Mie Prefecture for three terms. Shiba died on 15 November 2025, at the age of 75.

== Sources ==
- 政治家情報 〜芝 博一〜. JANJAN ザ･選挙 (in Japanese).
