= Yoshie Ōishi =

Japanese politician (1897–1971)

- 大石 ヨシエ
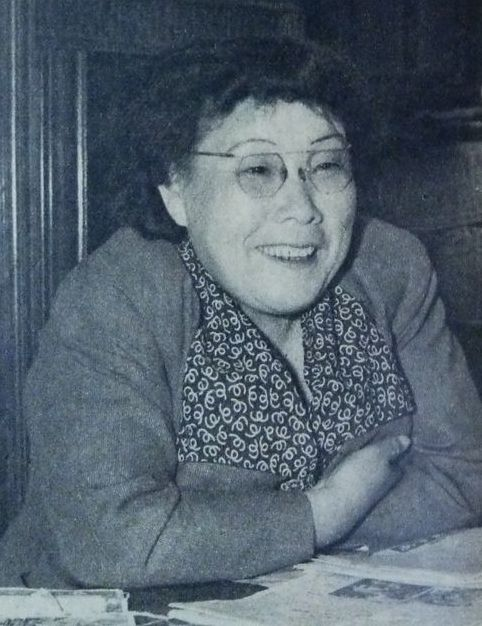
- Ōishi in 1952

Member of the House of Representatives
- In office 10 April 1946 – 24 January 1955
- Preceded by: Constituency established
- Succeeded by: Ryūichi Okamoto
- Constituency: Kyoto at-large (1946–1947); Kyoto 2nd (1947–1955)

Personal details
- Born: 12 February 1897 Kyoto Prefecture, Japan
- Died: 7 June 1971 (aged 74) Aichi Prefecture, Japan
- Party: Socialist
- Other party: RSP (1953–1955)
- Education: Osaka Shin-Ai Gakuin

Yoshie Ōishi (Japanese: 大石ヨシエ; 12 February 1897 – 7 June 1971) was a Japanese politician. She was one of the first group of women elected to the House of Representatives in 1946.

== Biography ==
Born in Kyoto Prefecture in 1897, Ōishi was educated at Shinai Girl's High School, from which she graduated in 1915. She became involved in the women's suffrage movement in Maizuru and later became a member of Kokumin Doshikai. She spent two years in the United States in the early 1930s, and then worked as an advisor to the Mukden edition of Mainichi Shimbun in Manchukuo, before returning to Japan. She became president of the New Japan Women's Association and the Maizur War Sufferer's Association.

Ōishi contested the 1946 general elections as an independent candidate in Kyoto, and was elected to the House of Representatives. After being elected, she joined the Japan Socialist Party, and was re-elected from Kyoto 2nd district in the 1947. She was re-elected on behalf of the Socialist Reform Party in 1949 and for the Cooperative Party in 1952, then as part of the Rightist Socialist Party in 1953. She lost her seat in the 1955 elections, after which she moved to Fukaya. She died in 1971.
