= Yoshitaka Sakurada =

Japanese politician

- 桜田 義孝
- Official portrait, 2013

Minister of State for the Tokyo Olympic and Paralympic Games
- In office 2 October 2018 – 10 April 2019
- Prime Minister: Shinzo Abe
- Preceded by: Shunichi Suzuki
- Succeeded by: Shunichi Suzuki

Member of the House of Representatives; from Southern Kanto
- In office 27 December 2012 – 9 October 2024
- Preceded by: Kimiaki Matsuzaki
- Succeeded by: Multi-member district
- Constituency: Chiba 8th (2012–2021); PR block (2021–2024)
- In office 20 October 1996 – 21 July 2009
- Preceded by: Constituency established
- Succeeded by: Kimiaki Matsuzaki
- Constituency: Chiba 8th (1996–2000); PR block (2003–2005); Chiba 8th (2005–2009)

Member of the Chiba Prefectural Assembly
- In office 1995–1996
- Constituency: Kashiwa City

Member of the Kashiwa City Assembly
- In office 1987–1995

Personal details
- Born: 20 December 1949 (age 76) Kashiwa, Chiba, Japan
- Party: Liberal Democratic
- Education: Meiji University

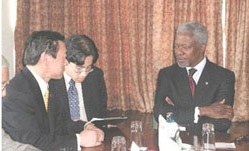
Sakurada with Kofi Annan at Nairobi in 2000

Yoshitaka Sakurada (桜田 義孝, Sakurada Yoshitaka; born 20 December 1949) is a former Japanese politician of the Liberal Democratic Party who served as a member of the House of Representatives in the Diet of Japan. He formerly served as Minister of State for the Tokyo Olympic and Paralympic Games in the Fourth Abe Cabinet.

== Career ==
A native of Kashiwa, Chiba, and a graduate of Meiji University, Sakurada served in the city assembly of Kashiwa for two terms from 1987 and in the assembly of Chiba Prefecture from 1995. He was elected to the House of Representatives for the first time in 1996.

His profile on the LDP website:

- Director, Committee on Rules and Administration
- Member, Committee on Fundamental National Policies
- Member, Deliberative Council on Political Ethics
- Deputy Chairman, Diet Affairs Committee of LDP

Sakurada is a board member of the Tokyo Organizing Committee for the Olympic Games (Tokyo 2020) and serves as a political adviser to the Pachinko Chain Stores Association (PCSA).

In October 2018, Sakurada entered the cabinet as the Minister of State for the Tokyo Olympic and Paralympic games. He resigned from the post just six months later after suggesting that the re-election campaign of a ruling LDP lawmaker was of a higher priority than the 2011 earthquake and tsunami reconstruction effort.

== Positions ==
Affiliated to the openly revisionist lobby Nippon Kaigi, Sakurada attended a meeting on 3 March 2014, to seek a review of the Kono Statement and voiced his support for the revision. In January 2016, he said that World War II comfort women were "professional prostitutes. That's business." He apologised later in the day.

Sakurada is a member of the following right-wing Diet groups:

- Nippon Kaigi Diet discussion group (日本会議国会議員懇談会 - Nippon kaigi kokkai giin kondankai)
- Conference of Parliamentarians on the Shinto Association of Spiritual Leadership (神道政治連盟国会議員懇談会) - NB: SAS a.k.a. Sinseiren, Shinto Political League, Shinto Seiji Renmei Kokkai Giin Kondankai
- Parliamentarians Acting to Protect Japanese Territory (日本の領土を守るため行動する議員連盟)

Sakurada gave the following answers to the questionnaire submitted by Mainichi to parliamentarians in 2012:

- in favor of the revision of the Constitution
- in favor of the right of collective self-defense (revision of Article 9)
- against the reform of the National Assembly (unicameral instead of bicameral)
- in favor of reactivating nuclear power plants
- against the goal of zero nuclear power by 2030s
- in favor of the relocation of Marine Corps Air Station Futenma (Okinawa)
- in favor of evaluating the purchase of Senkaku Islands by the Government
- in favor of a strong attitude vis-a-vis China
- against the participation of Japan to the Trans-Pacific Partnership
- in favor of a potentially nuclear-armed Japan in the future
- against the reform of the Imperial Household that would allow women to retain their Imperial status even after marriage

== Remarks ==
- Despite being deputy chief of the government's cyber-security strategy office, Sakurada admitted to the Japanese Diet in November 2018 that he had never used, and did not know how to use, a computer.
- At the forum in Tokyo, Sakurada said that "I was aiming for the position of Prime Minister in the past, but I cannot speak English and I cannot use a personal computer, so I will give up on it.".
- Sakurada often makes mistakes in speech and has strange pronunciation, so people in his hometown of Kashiwa call him "Tetsuro Degawa of Kashiwa".
- During the election of the House of Representatives, Sakurada who was speaking was suddenly attacked by an unemployed man who was drunk.
- Prior to taking office as Minister, Sakurada had put on his official site a cartoon depicting his life.
  Sakurada is first Minister for Kashiwa and Abiko.
- After 7th Ticad at Yokohama, Sakurada insists that "50 votes from African countries are required for Japan to become a Permanent members of the United Nations Security Council.".
