= Yamashina-ku =

Yamashina 山科区
- Ward of Kyoto
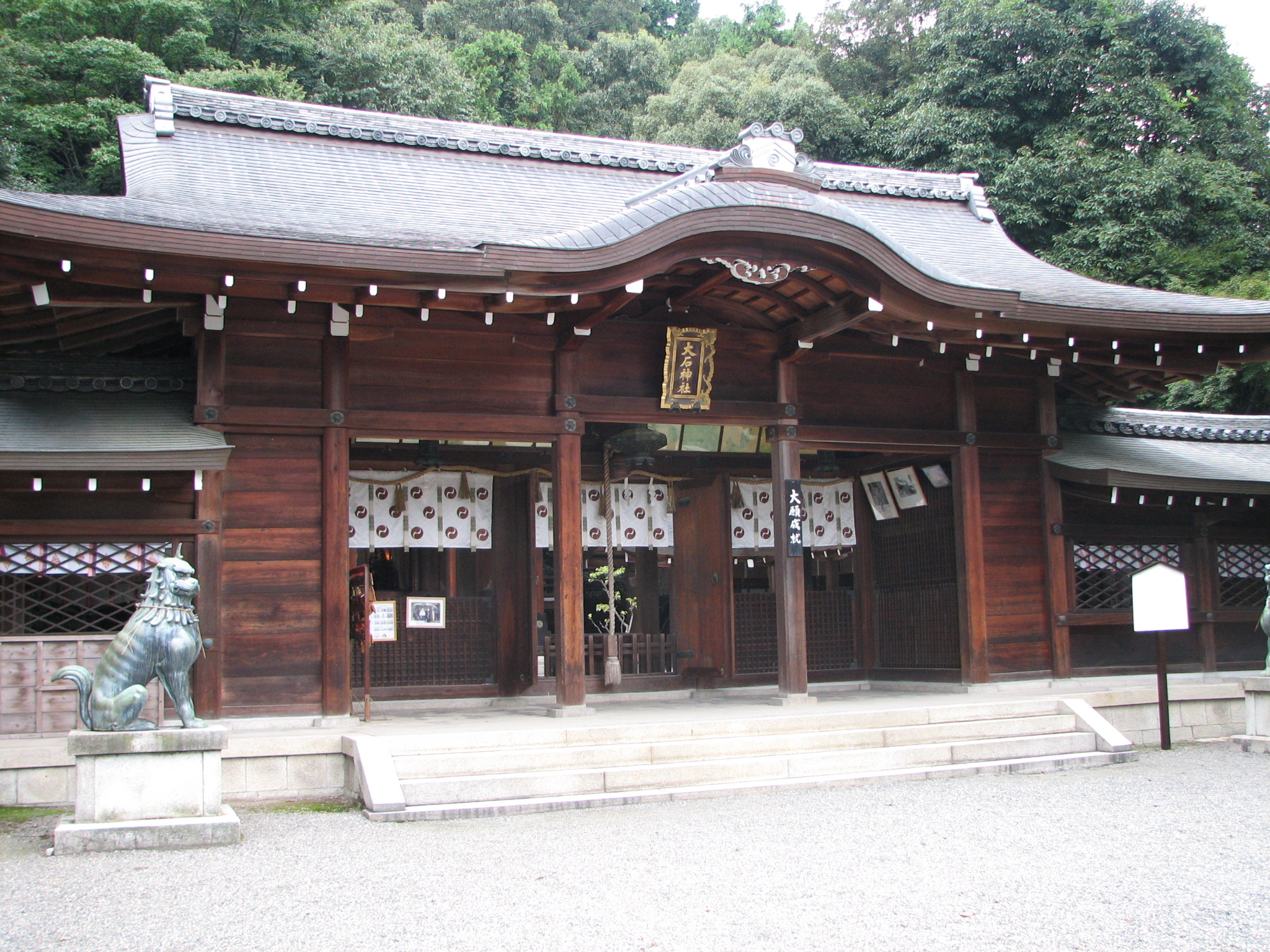
- Oishi jinja

- Location of Yamashina-ku in Kyoto

- Location of Yamashina-ku in Japan
- Coordinates: 34°58′20″N 135°48′49″E
- Country: Japan
- Prefecture: Kyoto
- City: Kyoto
- Founded: 1976

Area
  - Total: 28.7 km^{2} (11.1 sq mi)
- Highest elevation: 593 m (1,946 ft)
- Lowest elevation: 21 m (69 ft)

Population (October 1, 2020)
  - Total: 135,101
  - Estimate (2021): 134,253
  - Density: 4,710/km^{2} (12,200/sq mi)
- Time zone: UTC+9 (Japan Standard Time)
- Website: www.city.kyoto.lg.jp/yamashina/

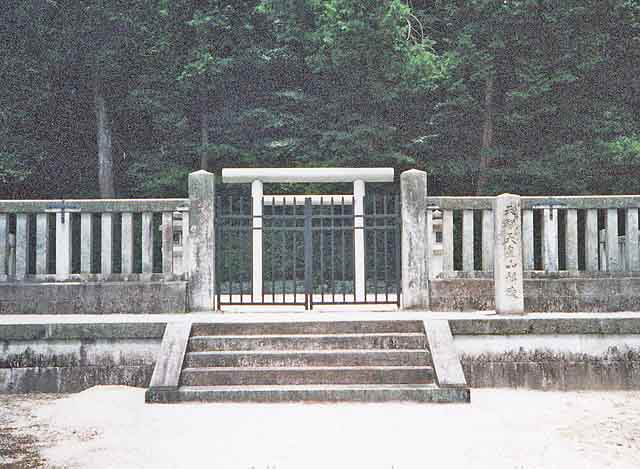
Tomb of Emperor Tenji

Yamashina (山科区, Yamashina-ku) is one of the eleven wards in the city of Kyoto, in Kyoto Prefecture, Japan. It lies in the southeastern part of the city, and Yamashina Station is one stop away from Kyoto Station on the Tōkaidō Main Line (Biwako Line). The area of Yamashina-ku is 28.70 km^{2}. As of October 1, 2021 the population of Yamashina-ku was 134,253.

Historically, Yamashina was an important point for traffic connecting Kyoto and east part of Japan. In the Edo period, it flourished as a post town along the Tōkaidō road. In modern times, Yamashina has become a bed town for those commuting to urban areas of Kyoto and Osaka.

== Demographics ==
Historical population
Year	Pop.	±%
1980	136,318	—
1990	136,070	−0.2%
2000	137,624	+1.1%
2010	136,045	−1.1%
2020	135,101	−0.7%

== Economy ==
Ohsho Food Service, the operator of Gyoza no Ohsho, is headquartered in the ward.

== Education ==
- Kyoto Pharmaceutical University
- Kyoto Tachibana University

== Sightseeing spots ==
Yamashina-ku is the location of the tomb of Emperor Tenji, the oldest Imperial tomb in Kyoto. The grave of Sakanoue no Tamuramaro is also here. The Lake Biwa Canal passes through the ward. Yamashina is home to the Ōishi Shrine and several noteworthy temples.

- Ansho-ji
- Bishamon-do
- Honkoku-ji temple
- Iwaya shrine
- Kajū-ji
- The Lake Biwa Canal
- Nakatomi-shrine
- Oishi shrine
- the tomb of Sakanoue no Tamuramaro
- the tomb of Emperor Tenji
- Yamashina-Hongan-ji
- Yamashina shrine
- Zuishin-in

== People from Yamashina ==
- Naomi Fujiyama (actress)
- Yoshikazu Kura (baseball player)
- Tomoko Nakajima (comedian, tsukkomi role in Othello)
