= Kyoto at-large district =

Japan House of Councillors constituency

Kyōto at-large district
- 京都府選挙区
- Parliamentary constituency for the House of Councillors
- Prefecture: Kyoto
- Electorate: 2,097,987 (as of September 2022)

Current constituency
- Created: 1947
- Seats: 4
- Councillors: Class of 2019: Akiko Kurabayashi (JCP); Shoji Nishida (LDP); Class of 2022: Tetsuro Fukuyama (CDP); Akira Yoshii (LDP)

The Kyoto at-large district (Japanese: 京都府選挙区, Hepburn: Kyōto-fu senkyoku) is a constituency that represents Kyoto Prefecture in the House of Councillors of the Diet of Japan. It has four Councillors in the 242-member house.

== Outline ==
The constituency represents the entire population of Kyoto Prefecture. Since its inception in 1947, the district has elected four Councillors to six-year terms, two at alternating elections held every three years. The district has 2,088,383 registered voters as of September 2015. The Councillors currently representing Kyoto are:

- Shoji Nishida (LDP, third term)
- Akiko Kurabayashi (Japanese Communist Party (JCP), second term)
- Tetsuro Fukuyama (Democratic Party, fifth term)
- Akira Yoshii (Liberal Democratic Party (LDP), first term)

== Elected Councillors ==
Class of 1947		election year	Class of 1950 (3-year term in 1947)	
Rinichi Hatano (Ind.) (Note: Later joined Ryokufūkai)	Kunihiko Kanie (Social Democratic)	1947	Ōnogi Hidejirō (Note: Died in office 4 March 1966.) (LDP) (Note: Elected in 1947 and 1950 as a member of the LDP's predecessor Liberal Party)	Shuichiro Oku (Liberal)
Rinichi Hatano (Ind.)	Kunihiko Kanie (Social Democratic)	1950	Ōnogi Hidejirō (LDP)	Ikuo Oyama (Ind.) (Note: Died in office 30 November 1955)
Seiichi Inoue (LDP) (Note: Elected in 1947 and 1953 as a member of the LDP's predecessor Liberal Party)	Katsuo Takenaka (Note: Died in office 26 January 1959) (Right Socialist)	1953	Ōnogi Hidejirō (LDP)	Ikuo Oyama (Ind.)
Seiichi Inoue (LDP)	Katsuo Takenaka (Right Socialist)	1956 by-election (Note: Held 15 January 1956)	Ōnogi Hidejirō (LDP)	Hideo Konishi (LDP)
Seiichi Inoue (LDP)	Katsuo Takenaka (Right Socialist)	1956	Ōnogi Hidejirō (LDP)	Totaro Fujita (Social Democratic)
Seiichi Inoue (LDP)	Eiichi Nagasue (Note: Resigned 30 October 1963 to contest the December general election for the House of Representatives) (Social Democratic)	1959	Ōnogi Hidejirō (LDP)	Totaro Fujita (Social Democratic)
Seiichi Inoue (LDP)	Eiichi Nagasue (Social Democratic)	1962	Ōnogi Hidejirō (LDP)	Totaro Fujita (Social Democratic)
Seiichi Inoue (LDP)	Mitsunori Ueki (LDP)	1963 by-election (Note: Held 10 December 1963)	Ōnogi Hidejirō (LDP)	Totaro Fujita (Social Democratic)
Kazutaka Ohashi (Note: Resigned 13 March 1974 to contest the Kyoto gubernatorial election) (Social Democratic)	Mitsunori Ueki (LDP)	1965	Ōnogi Hidejirō (LDP)	Totaro Fujita (Social Democratic)
Kazutaka Ohashi (Social Democratic)	Mitsunori Ueki (LDP)	1966 by-election (Note: Held 27 April 1966)	Yukio Hayashida (Note: Resigned 15 March 1978 to contest the Kyoto gubernatorial election) (LDP)	Totaro Fujita (Social Democratic)
Kazutaka Ohashi (Social Democratic)	Mitsunori Ueki (LDP)	1968	Yukio Hayashida (LDP)	Kenji Kawada (JCP)
Kazutaka Ohashi (Social Democratic)	Mitsunori Ueki (LDP)	1971	Yukio Hayashida (LDP)	Kenji Kawada (JCP)
Hanji Ogawa (LDP)	Mitsunori Ueki (LDP)	1974 by-election (Note: Held 21 April 1974)	Yukio Hayashida (LDP)	Kenji Kawada (JCP)
Hanji Ogawa (LDP)	Mitsunori Ueki (LDP)	1974	Yukio Hayashida (LDP)	Kenji Kawada (JCP)
Akio Sato (JCP)	Mitsunori Ueki (LDP)	1977	Yukio Hayashida (LDP)	Kenji Kawada (JCP)
Akio Sato (JCP)	Mitsunori Ueki (LDP)	1978 by-election (Note: Held 23 April 1978)	Minoru Ueda (LDP)	Kenji Kawada (JCP)
Akio Sato (JCP)	Mitsunori Ueki (LDP)	1980	Minoru Ueda (LDP)	Shinnosuke Kamitani (JCP)
Akio Sato (JCP)	Mitsunori Ueki (LDP)	1983	Minoru Ueda (LDP)	Shinnosuke Kamitani (JCP)
Akio Sato (JCP)	Mitsunori Ueki (LDP)	1986	Yukio Hayashida (LDP)	Shinnosuke Kamitani (JCP)
Teiko Sasano (Democratic Reform) (Note: Contested the 1989 election as a member of the Rengō no Kai.)	Yoshihiro Nishida (LDP)	1989	Yukio Hayashida (LDP)	Shinnosuke Kamitani (JCP)
Teiko Sasano (Democratic Reform)	Yoshihiro Nishida (LDP)	1992	Yukio Hayashida (LDP)	Tokiko Nishiyama (JCP)
Teiko Sasano (Democratic Reform)	Yoshihiro Nishida (LDP)	1995	Yukio Hayashida (LDP)	Tokiko Nishiyama (JCP)
Teiko Sasano (Democratic Reform)	Yoshihiro Nishida (LDP)	1998	Tetsuro Fukuyama (DPJ) (Note: Contested the 1998 election as an independent but joined the DPJ soon after.)	Tokiko Nishiyama (JCP)
Koji Matsui (DPJ)	Yoshihiro Nishida (LDP)	2001	Tetsuro Fukuyama (DPJ)	Tokiko Nishiyama (JCP)
Koji Matsui (DPJ)	Yoshihiro Nishida (LDP)	2004	Tetsuro Fukuyama (DPJ)	Satoshi Ninoyu (LDP)
Koji Matsui (DPJ)	Shoji Nishida (LDP)	2007	Tetsuro Fukuyama (DPJ)	Satoshi Ninoyu (LDP)
Koji Matsui (DPJ)	Shoji Nishida (LDP)	2010	Tetsuro Fukuyama (DPJ)	Satoshi Ninoyu (LDP)
Akiko Kurabayashi (JCP)	Shoji Nishida (LDP)	2013	Tetsuro Fukuyama (DPJ)	Satoshi Ninoyu (LDP)
Akiko Kurabayashi (JCP)	Shoji Nishida (LDP)	2016	Tetsuro Fukuyama (DPJ)	Satoshi Ninoyu (LDP)
Akiko Kurabayashi (JCP)	Shoji Nishida (LDP)	2019	Tetsuro Fukuyama (DPJ)	Akira Yoshii (LDP)
Akiko Kurabayashi (JCP)	Shoji Nishida (LDP)	2022	Tetsuro Fukuyama (DPJ)	Akira Yoshii (LDP)

== Election results ==
2025
Party	Candidate	Votes	%	±%
Ishin	Shohei Niimi	332,523	28.1	
LDP	Shoji Nishida (Incumbent) (Endorsed by Komeito)	190,104	16.1%	
JCP	Akiko Kurabayashi	163,805	13.8%	
Sanseito	Aoto Taniguchi	142,371	12.0%	
CDP	Wakako Yamamoto	127,874	10.8%	
DPP	Tsuneo Sakai			
Reiwa	Minako Saigō			
Independent	Shinji Ninoyu			
Anti-NHK	Yoshitaka Kimura			
Turnout				

2022
Party	Candidate	Votes	%	±%
LDP	Akira Yoshii (Endorsed by Komeito)	293,071	28.2	
CDP	Tetsuro Fukuyama (Incumbent)	275,140	26.5	
Ishin	Yuko Kusui	257,852	24.8	
JCP	Ayako Takeyama	130,260	12.5	
Sanseitō	Yuki Adachi	40,500	3.9	
Ishin Seito Shimpu	Kumi Hashimoto	21,614	2.1	
Anti-NHK	Tastuya Hoshino	8,946	0.9	
Anti-NHK	Masahiko Omi	7,181	0.7	
Ganbare Nippon	Motoyuki Hirai	5,414	0.5	
Turnout		1,039,978		

2019
Party	Candidate	Votes	%	±%
LDP	Shoji Nishida (Incumbent) (Endorsed by Komeito)	421,731	44.2	
JCP	Akiko Kurabayashi	246,436	25.8	
CDP	Hiroko Masuhara	232,354	24.4	
Anti-NHK	Akihisa Yamada	37,353	3.9	
Olive Party	Takashi Mikami	16,057	1.9	
Turnout				

2013
Party	Candidate	Votes	%	±%
LDP	Shoji Nishida (Incumbent) (Endorsed by Komeito)	390,577	37.0	
JCP	Akiko Kurabayashi	219,273	20.7	
Democratic	Keiro Kitagami	201,297	19.0	
Restoration	Seisuke Yamauchi	56,409	16.8	
Your	Yoko Kinoshita	71,983	6.8	
Happiness Realization	Shusaku Soga	6,119	0.6	
Uchide Party	Nobuo Shindo	2,906	0.3	
Turnout				

2010
Party	Candidate	Votes	%	±%
Democratic	Tetsuro Fukuyama (Incumbent) (Endorsed by People's New Party)	374,550	34.3	
LDP	Satoshi Ninoyu (Incumbent)	308,296	28.2	
JCP	Mariko Narumiya	181,691	16.6	
Your	Takuya Nakagawa	120,262	11.0	
Democratic	Mitsue Kawakami	94,761	8.7	
Happiness Realization	Satoko Kitagawa	11,962	1.1	
Turnout				

2007
Party	Candidate	Votes	%	±%
Democratic	Koji Matsui (Incumbent)	501,979	43.6	
LDP	Shoji Nishida (Endorsed by Komeito)	362,274	31.4	
JCP	Mariko Narumiya	275,285	23.9	
Ishin Seito Shimpu	Toyokazu Okido	12,799	1.1	
Turnout				

2004
Party	Candidate	Votes	%	±%
Democratic	Tetsuro Fukuyama (Incumbent)	484,297	43.8	
LDP	Satoshi Ninoyu (Endorsed by Komeito)	358,512	32.4	
JCP	Tokiko Nishiyama (Incumbent)	263,548	23.8	
Turnout				

== See also ==
- List of districts of the House of Councillors of Japan
