= Kyoto 2nd district (1947–1993) =

Former Japan House of Representatives constituency

Kyōto 2nd district was a multi-member constituency of the House of Representatives in the Diet of Japan. Between 1947 and 1993 it elected five Representatives by single non-transferable vote. It was located in Kyōto and, as of 1993, consisted of Kyōto city's Ukyō, Fushimi and Nishikyō wards and all other cities, towns and villages in the prefecture.

Representatives for Kyōto 2nd district included Democratic Party president and prime minister Hitoshi Ashida, LDP faction leader, secretary general and justice minister Shigesaburō Maeo, education minister Sen'ichi Tanigaki and his son Sadakazu and home affairs minister Hiromu Nonaka. Since Kyoto was thea stronghold of the Communist Party, Kyoto's two electoral districts were among the few districts in the country where the JCP ever nominated more than one candidate – in its last such attempt in the 2nd district in the 1983 general election, both Communist candidates lost due to vote splitting.

== Summary of results during the 1955 party system ==
General election		1958	1960	1963	1967	1969	1972	1976	1979	1980	1983	1986	1990	1993
LDP & conservative independents		3	2	2	2	2	2	1	1	2	2	2	2	2
Opposition	center-left	0	1	1	1	1	1	2	2	2	2	2	1	2
Opposition	JSP	2	2	2	2	1	1	1	1	0	1	0	1	0
Opposition	JCP	0	0	0	0	1	1	1	1	1	0	1	1	1
Seats up		5												

== Elected Representatives ==
election year	highest vote (top tōsen)	2nd	3rd	4th	5th
1947	Hitoshi Ashida (DP)	Tenrei Ōta (JSP)	Takeo Nonaka (JLP)	Yoshie Ōishi (JSP)	Takezō Okumura (JLP)
1949	Hitoshi Ashida (DP)	Yoshie Ōishi (SRP)	Shigesaburō Maeo (DLP)	Takeo Nonaka (DLP)	Kenji Kawada (JCP)
1952	Hitoshi Ashida (Progressive)	Hidekazu Yanagita (left JSP)	Shigesaburō Maeo (LP)	Yoshie Ōishi (Coop)	Takeo Nonaka (LP)
1953	Kō Tanaka (Yoshida LP)	Hitoshi Ashida (Progressive)	Shigesaburō Maeo (Yoshida LP)	Hidekazu Yanagita (left JSP)	Yoshie Ōishi (right JSP)
1955	Hitoshi Ashida (JDP)	Shigesaburō Maeo (LP)	Ryūichi Okamoto (left JSP)	Suegorō Kawasaki (JDP)	Hidekazu Yanagita (left JSP)
1958	Shigesaburō Maeo (LDP)	Hidekazu Yanagita (JSP)	Hitoshi Ashida (LDP)	Ryūichi Okamoto (JSP)	Suegorō Kawasaki (LDP)
1960	Shigesaburō Maeo (LDP)	Hidekazu Yanagita (JSP)	Ryūichi Okamoto (JSP)	Sen'ichi Tanigaki (LDP)	Ittoku Tamaki (DSP)
1963	Shigesaburō Maeo (LDP)	Ittoku Tamaki (DSP)	Ryūichi Okamoto (JSP)	Hidekazu Yanagita (JSP)	Sen'ichi Tanigaki (LDP)
1967	Shigesaburō Maeo (LDP)	Sen'ichi Tanigaki (LDP)	Hidekazu Yanagita (JSP)	Ittoku Tamaki (DSP)	Ryūichi Okamoto (JSP)
1969	Iwao Teramae (JCP)	Shigesaburō Maeo (LDP)	Hidekazu Yanagita (JSP)	Kiyoshi Nishinaka (Kōmeitō)	Sen'ichi Tanigaki (LDP)
1972	Yoshiharu Yamada (JSP)	Iwao Teramae (JCP)	Sen'ichi Tanigaki (LDP)	Shigesaburō Maeo (LDP)	Ittoku Tamaki (DSP)
1976	Iwao Teramae (JCP)	Kiyoshi Nishinaka (Kōmeitō)	Shigesaburō Maeo (LDP)	Yoshiharu Yamada (JSP)	Ittoku Tamaki (DSP)
1979 by-el. (two seats up)	Iwao Teramae (JCP)	Kiyoshi Nishinaka (Kōmeitō)	Shigesaburō Maeo (LDP)	Sen'ichi Tanigaki (LDP)	Kazuya Tamaki (DSP)
1979	Iwao Teramae (JCP)	Kazuya Tamaki (DSP)	Sen'ichi Tanigaki (LDP)	Kiyoshi Nishinaka (Kōmeitō)	Yoshiharu Yamada (JSP)
1980	Shigesaburō Maeo (LDP)	Sen'ichi Tanigaki (LDP)	Kazuya Tamaki (DSP)	Iwao Teramae (JCP)	Kiyoshi Nishinaka (Kōmeitō)
1983 by-el. (two seats up)	Sadakazu Tanigaki (LDP)	Hiromu Nonaka (LDP)	Kazuya Tamaki (DSP)	Iwao Teramae (JCP)	Kiyoshi Nishinaka (Kōmeitō)
1983	Hiromu Nonaka (LDP)	Sadakazu Tanigaki (LDP)	Kiyoshi Nishinaka (Kōmeitō)	Kazuya Tamaki (DSP)	Sueharu Yamanaka (JSP)
1986	Iwao Teramae (JCP)	Hiromu Nonaka (LDP)	Sadakazu Tanigaki (LDP)	Kiyoshi Nishinaka (Kōmeitō)	Kazuya Tamaki (DSP)
1990	Sueharu Yamanaka (JSP)	Hiromu Nonaka (LDP)	Sadakazu Tanigaki (LDP)	Iwao Teramae (JCP)	Kiyoshi Nishinaka (Kōmeitō)
1993	Iwao Teramae (JCP)	Hiromu Nonaka (LDP)	Yasuhide Yamana (Kōmeitō)	Sadakazu Tanigaki (LDP)	Juntarō Toyoda (JRP)

== Last election result 1993 ==
1993
Party	Candidate	Votes	%	±%
JCP	Iwao Teramae	155,958	18.5	
LDP	Hiromu Nonaka	129,402	15.4	
Kōmeitō	Yasuhide Yamana	118,882	14.1	
LDP	Sadakazu Tanigaki	118,019	14.0	
Shinseito	Juntarō Toyoda	115,142	13.7	
Democratic Socialist	Kazuya Tamaki	111,206	13.2	
Socialist	Isoo Tabuchi	86,079	10.2	
Independent	Jun'ichi Ono	6,696	0.8	
Turnout		855,720	64.79	
