= Kyoto Municipal Junior College of Nursing =

Coordinates: 34°59′51.4″N 135°44′1.8″E

Kyoto Municipal Junior College of Nursing (京都市立看護短期大学, Kyōto shiritsu kango tanki daigaku) was a public junior college in Kyoto, Kyoto, Japan, established in 1954. The predecessor of the school was founded in 1950. The college was discontinued in 2013.
