= Kyoto Prefectural Assembly =

Parliament of Kyoto, Japan

Kyoto Prefectural Assembly 京都府議会

Type
- Type: Unicameral

Leadership
- Chairman: Ryūzō Aramaki, LDP
- Vice Chairman: Kazuhisa Umoto, LDP

Structure
- Seats: 60
- Political groups: Government (48) LDP (30) CDP (11) Kōmeitō (5) Ishin (2) Opposition (12) JCP (12)

Elections
- Last election: 7 April 2019

Meeting place
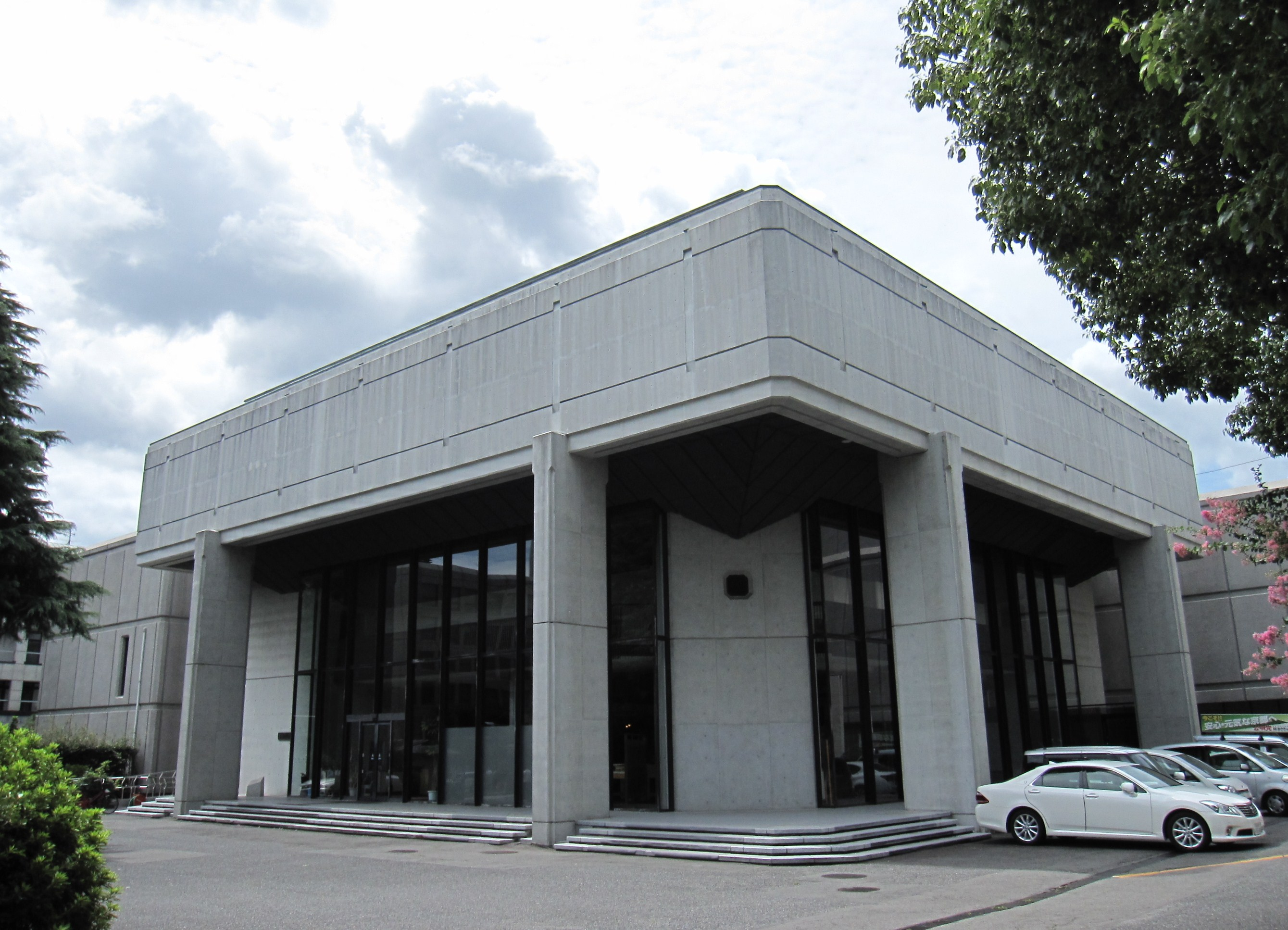

Website
- www.pref.kyoto.jp/gikai/index.html

The Kyoto Prefectural Assembly (京都府議会, Kyōto-fu Gikai) is the prefectural parliament of Kyoto Prefecture.

== Overview ==
Kyoto Prefecture is a stronghold of the Japanese Communist Party, which continued with the revolutionary government of Torazō Ninagawa over the seventh term over 28 years. The two-person district was called the "co-reserved seat" (the Kyoto at-large district was also called that).

In the 2007 Kyoto Prefectural Assembly election, the Democratic candidate defeated the Liberal Democratic Party candidate in the one-person constituency of Ayabe, Kyoto, and made a breakthrough in the second party. For this reason, for a period of time, the composition of Kyoto's own "Community vs. Anti-Community" was becoming "Land vs. Democracy vs. Communism". The Communist Party moved up to the second party with three more seats, such as the first elected winner in Yawata City in the two-member district.

== Members ==
Constituency	No. of people	Members	Ref
Kita-ku	3	Yoshiyuki Hamada; Toshiki Hirai; Yūichi Kishimoto
Kamigyō-ku	2	Yukiko Miyashita; Yūji Sako
Sakyō-ku	3	Chiharu Kitaoka; Munehisa Ishida; Atsuhiro Mitsunaga
Nakagyō-ku	3	Yoshiteru Aoki; Kan Harada; Kenji Tanaka
Higashiyama-ku	1	Ryūzō Aramaki
Yamashina-ku	3	Masaki Hayashi; Hideki Kajiwara; Hiroshi Sugaya
Shimogyō-ku	2	Mitsuji Komaki; Ikuko Nishiwaki
Minami-ku	3	Kōji Akita; Yoshihiro Kokaji; Yoshiko Yamauchi
Ukyō-ku	5	Junji Kitahara; Mitsu Morooka; Shinji Ninoyu; Kazunori Okamoto; Keiko Shimada
Nishikyō-ku	3	Kunie Hatamoto; Eitarō Kondō; Mariko Narumiya
Fushimi-ku	6	Kōhei Baba; Kiyoyuki Kamikura; Takeshi Maenami; Nobuhide Nishiyama; Kuniko Watanabe; Masaru Yamaguchi
Fukuchiyama	2	Masaru Iemoto; Shigenori Inoue
Maizuru	2	Masayoshi Ikeda; Mai Ohara
Ayabe	1	Kentarō Shikata
Uji and Kuse-gun	5	Yukiko Fujiyama; Osamu Mizutani; Hiroshi Murai; Toyohisa Ogihara; Mikiko Tanaka
Jōyō	2	Tsuneo Sakai; Hiromichi Sonosaki
Miyazu and Yoza-gun	1	Takefumi Nakashima
Kameoka	2	Masataka Nakamura; Hideo Tanaka
Mukō	1	Masaru Isono
Nagaokakyō and Otokuni-gun	2	Masahiro Nose; Junta Tsutsumi
Yawata	2	Yoshimi Morishita; Yoshimitsu Tajima
Kyōtanabe and Tsuzuki-gun	2	Yoshitaka Furubayashi; Takashi Kitagawa
Kyōtango	1	Tōru Moriguchi
Nantan and Funai-gun	1	Seiji Katayama
Kizugawa and Sōraku-gun	2	Kazuhisa Umoto; Atsuji Yamamoto
