= Committee on Education, Culture and Science =

Committee of the Japanese House of Councillors

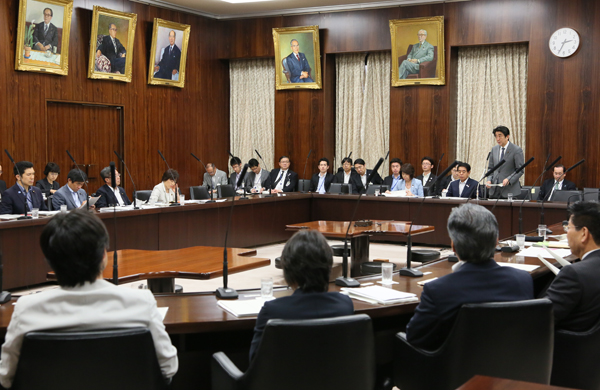
The Committee on Education, Culture and Science in June 2014

The Committee on Education, Culture and Science (文教科学委員会, Bunkyō-kagaku-īnkai) is a committee of the House of Councillors in Japan.

The Committee on Education, Culture and Science is a standing committee that only exists in the House of Councillors. This committee was first established on January 31, 2001, during the 151st session of the National Diet. The committee's jurisdiction was established by parliamentary procedure and set to deliberate matters under the jurisdiction of the Ministry of Education, Culture, Sports, Science and Technology. Members of the committee are appointed by the House of Councillors (Diet Law Article 42, clause 1). Members of the committee are nominated by the President (The Rules of the House of Councillors Article 30, clause 1). In practice, each political group is allocated seats on the committee in proportion to the number of seats it has in the House of Councillors and then each political group decides which of its members will be assigned to the committee. The chairperson of the committee is elected from among the members of the committee (Diet Law 25, clause 1) or selected by the President (The Rules of the House of Councillors Article 16, clause 2), but the latter happens most of the time.

== Members, 211th Diet ==
Position	Name	Political group
Chairman	Katsunori Takahashi	Liberal Democratic Party
Director	Masaaki Akaike	Liberal Democratic Party
Director	Eriko Imai	Liberal Democratic Party
Director	Hiroto Kumagai	Constitutional Democratic Party of Japan
Director	Takae Itō	Democratic Party for the People and The Shin-Ryokufukai
Member	Ken Akamatsu	Liberal Democratic Party
Member	Michiko Ueno	Liberal Democratic Party
Member	Shoichi Usui	Liberal Democratic Party
Member	Mitsuru Sakurai	Liberal Democratic Party
Member	Shinsuke Suematsu	Liberal Democratic Party
Member	Harumi Takahashi	Liberal Democratic Party
Member	Seiko Hashimoto	Liberal Democratic Party
Member	Chikage Koga	Constitutional Democratic Party of Japan
Member	Yoshitaka Saitō	Constitutional Democratic Party of Japan
Member	Haruko Miyaguchi	Constitutional Democratic Party of Japan
Member	Takae Itō	Komeito
Member	Shinji Takeuchi	Komeito
Member	Kiyoshi Nakajo	Nippon Ishin no Kai
Member	Shigefumi Matsuzawa	Nippon Ishin no Kai
Member	Yoshiko Kira	Japanese Communist Party
Member	Yasuhiko Funago	Reiwa Shinsengumi
