= Kyoto Pharmaceutical University =

Coordinates: 34°59′26.2″N 135°48′35″E

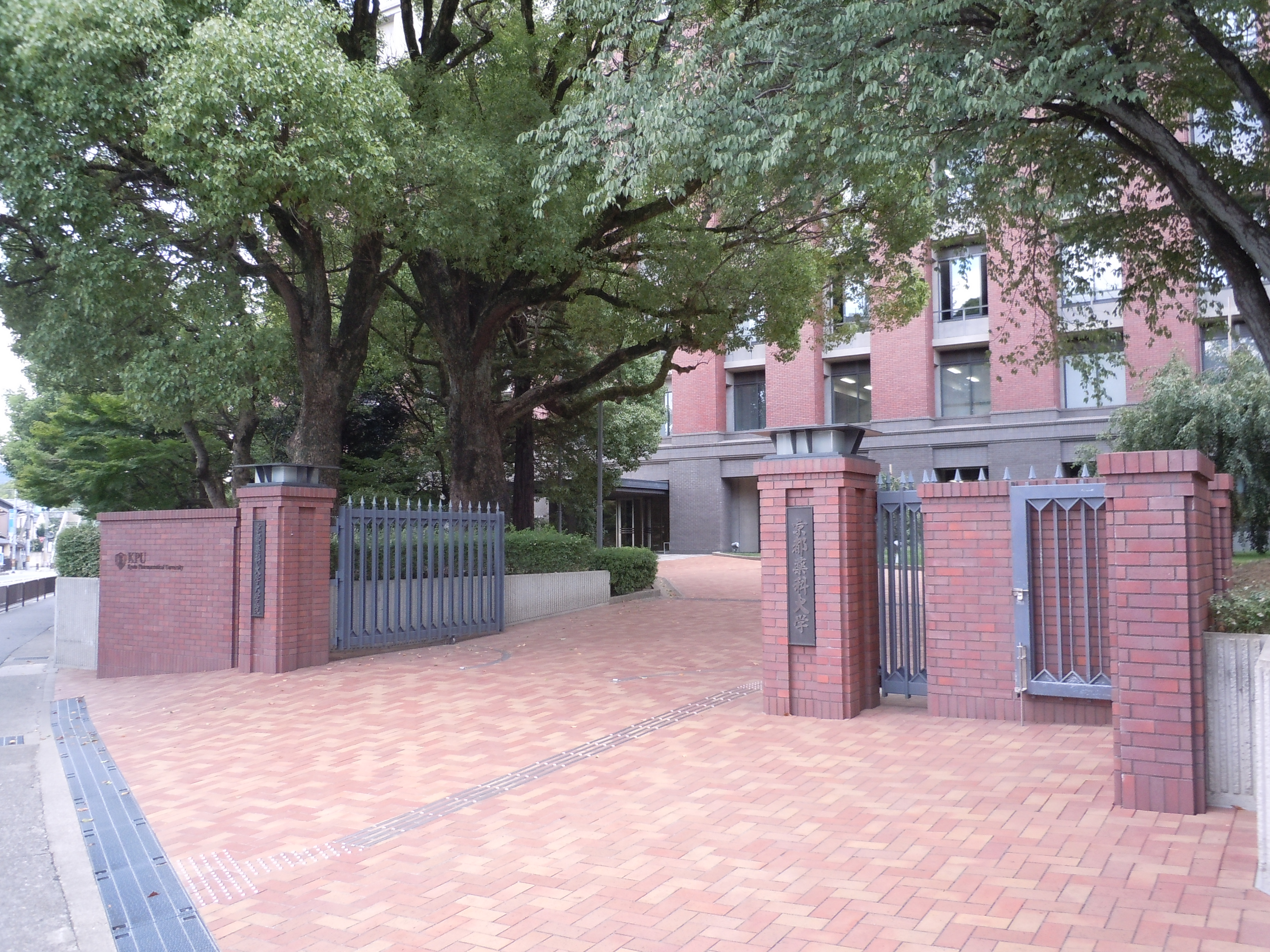
Kyoto Pharmaceutical University main gate.

Kyoto Pharmaceutical University (京都薬科大学, Kyoto yakka daigaku) is a private university in Kyoto, Kyoto, Japan. The school's predecessor was founded in 1884. It was chartered as a university in 1949. Because it trains pharmacist-scientists, pharmacists that also possess research skills, Kyoto Pharmaceutical University has laboratories in a wide range of fields. Each laboratory has about 10 members that focus on their research. Students perform research for their pharmaceutical specializations.
