= First Yoshida cabinet =

Cabinet of Japan (1946–1947)

First Yoshida Cabinet
- 45th Cabinet of Japan

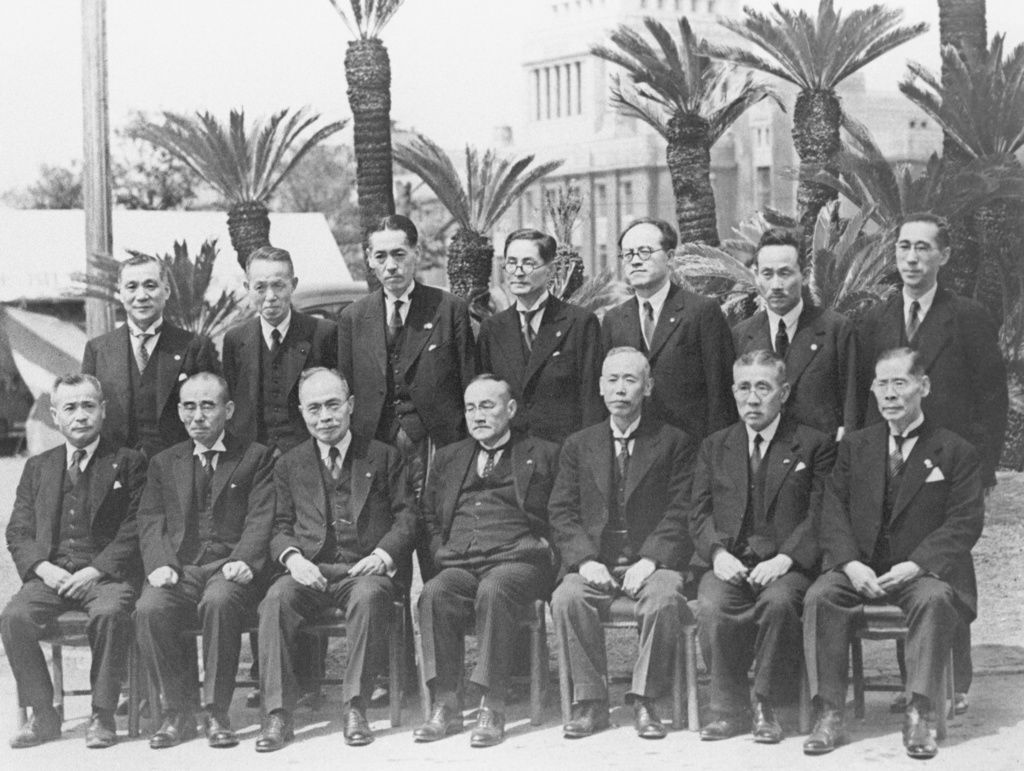
- Date formed: May 22, 1946
- Date dissolved: May 24, 1947

People and organisations
- Emperor: Hirohito
- Prime Minister: Shigeru Yoshida
- Deputy Prime Minister: Kijūrō Shidehara (from May 3, 1947)
- Member parties: (Allied occupation); Liberal Party; Japan Progressive Party (until March 31, 1947); Democratic Party (from March 31, 1947)
- Status in legislature: Majority (coalition)
- Opposition parties: Japan Socialist Party; Japanese Communist Party; Japan Cooperative Party

History
- Election: 1946 Japanese general election
- Outgoing election: 1947 Japanese general election
- Legislature terms: 90th-92nd Imperial Diet; 1st National Diet
- Predecessor: Shidehara Cabinet
- Successor: Katayama Cabinet

The First Yoshida Cabinet was the 45th Cabinet of Japan led by Shigeru Yoshida from 22 May 1946 to 24 May 1947, during the Allied occupation.

== Cabinet ==
Ministers
| Portfolio | Name | Political party | Term start | Term end |
|---|---|---|---|---|
| Prime Minister | Shigeru Yoshida | Liberal | May 22, 1946 | May 24, 1947 |
| Minister for Foreign Affairs | Shigeru Yoshida | Liberal | May 22, 1946 | May 24, 1947 |
| Minister of Home Affairs | Seiichi Ōmura | Independent | May 22, 1946 | January 31, 1947 |
| Minister of Finance | Tanzan Ishibashi | Independent | May 22, 1946 | May 24, 1947 |
| First Minister of Demobilization | Shigeru Yoshida | Liberal | May 22, 1946 | June 15, 1946 |
| Second Minister of Demobilization | Shigeru Yoshida | Liberal | May 22, 1946 | June 15, 1946 |
| Minister of Justice | Tokutarō Kimura | Independent | May 22, 1946 | May 24, 1947 |
| Minister of Education | Kōtarō Tanaka | Independent | May 22, 1946 | January 31, 1947 |
| Minister of Health | Yoshinari Kawai | Independent | May 22, 1946 | May 22, 1947 |
| Minister of Agriculture, Forestry and Fisheries | Hiroo Wada | Independent | May 22, 1946 | January 31, 1947 |
| Minister of Commerce and Industry | Nirō Hoshijima | Liberal | May 22, 1946 | January 31, 1947 |
| Minister of Transport | Tsunejirō Hiratsuka | Liberal | May 22, 1946 | January 31, 1947 |
| Minister of Communications | Sadayoshi Hitotsumatsu | Democratic | July 1, 1946 | May 24, 1947 |
| Minister of State President of the Demobilization Board (from June 15, 1946) | Baron Kijūrō Shidehara | Democratic | May 22, 1946 | May 24, 1947 |
| Minister of State President of the Administrative Research Board (from October 28, 1946) | Takao Saitō | Democratic | May 22, 1946 | May 24, 1947 |
| Minister of State | Sadayoshi Hitotsumatsu | Democratic | May 22, 1946 | July 1, 1946 |
| Minister of State | Etsujirō Uehara | Liberal | May 22, 1946 | January 31, 1947 |
| Minister of State | Tokujiro Kanamori | Independent | June 19, 1946 | May 24, 1947 |
| Minister of State Director-General of the Economic Stabilization Board (from August 12, 1946); Chief of the Price Board (from August 12, 1946) | Keinosuke Zen | Independent | July 23, 1946 | January 31, 1947 |
| Chief Cabinet Secretary | Jōji Hayashi | Liberal | May 22, 1946 | May 24, 1947 |
| Director-General of the Cabinet Legislation Bureau | Toshio Irie | Independent | May 22, 1946 | May 24, 1947 |
| Deputy Chief Cabinet Secretary | Shirō Kiuchi | Independent | May 22, 1946 | June 14, 1946 |
| Deputy Chief Cabinet Secretary | Hideo Sutō | Independent | June 14, 1946 | May 24, 1947 |
Parliamentary Vice-Ministers
| Portfolio | Name | Political party | Term start | Term end |
| Parliamentary Vice-Minister for Foreign Affairs | Shūji Masutani | Liberal | June 4, 1946 | March 4, 1947 |
| Parliamentary Vice-Minister of Home Affairs | Banboku Ōno | Liberal | June 4, 1946 | June 22, 1946 |
| Parliamentary Vice-Minister of Home Affairs | Sekō Kōichi | Liberal | June 22, 1946 | March 4, 1947 |
| Parliamentary Vice-Minister of Finance | Uetsuka Tsukasa | Liberal | June 4, 1946 | March 4, 1947 |
| Parliamentary Vice-Minister of Justice | Furushima Yoshihide | Liberal | June 4, 1946 | March 4, 1947 |
| Parliamentary Vice-Minister of Education | Nagano Nagahiro | Progressive | June 4, 1946 | March 4, 1947 |
| Parliamentary Vice-Minister of Agriculture, Forestry and Fisheries | Ōishi Rinji | Liberal | June 4, 1946 | March 4, 1947 |
| Parliamentary Vice Minister of Commerce and Industry | Kobayashi Kanae | Progressive | June 4, 1946 | March 4, 1947 |
| Parliamentary Vice-Minister of Transport | Matsuda Masakazu | Progressive | June 4, 1946 | March 4, 1947 |
| Parliamentary Vice-Minister of Health | Hattori Iwakichi | Liberal | June 4, 1946 | March 4, 1947 |
| Parliamentary Vice-Minister of Communications | Nakagawa Shigeharu | Democratic | July 1, 1946 | May 24, 1947 |
Parliamentary Undersecretaries
| Portfolio | Name | Political party | Term start | Term end |
| Parliamentary Undersecretary for Foreign Affairs | Shiotsuki Manabu | Progressive | June 4, 1946 | March 4, 1947 |
| Parliamentary Undersecretary of Home Affairs | Katsura Sakuzō | Progressive | June 4, 1946 | March 4, 1947 |
| Parliamentary Undersecretary of Finance | Shibata Hyōichirō | Progressive | June 4, 1946 | March 4, 1947 |
| Parliamentary Undersecretary of Justice | Nakamura Mataichi | Progressive | June 4, 1946 | March 4, 1947 |
| Parliamentary Undersecretary of Education | Hanamura Shirō | Liberal | June 4, 1946 | March 4, 1947 |
| Parliamentary Undersecretary of Agriculture, Forestry and Fisheries | Suzuki Kyōhei | Progressive | June 4, 1946 | March 4, 1947 |
| Parliamentary Undersecretary of Commerce and Industry | Okonogi Utaji | Liberal | June 4, 1946 | March 4, 1947 |
| Parliamentary Undersecretary of Transport | Tsuji Kanichi | Liberal | June 4, 1946 | March 4, 1947 |
| Parliamentary Undersecretary of Health | Satō Hisao | Progressive | June 4, 1946 | March 4, 1947 |
| Parliamentary Undersecretary of Communications | Yamamura Shinjirō | Liberal | July 1, 1946 | March 4, 1947 |

== Reshuffled Cabinet ==
A Cabinet reshuffle took place on January 31, 1947.

Ministers
| Portfolio | Name | Political party | Term start | Term end |
|---|---|---|---|---|
| Prime Minister | Shigeru Yoshida | Liberal | May 22, 1946 | May 24, 1947 |
| Deputy Prime Minister | Kijūrō Shidehara | Democratic | May 3, 1947 | May 24, 1947 |
| Minister for Foreign Affairs | Shigeru Yoshida | Liberal | May 22, 1946 | May 24, 1947 |
| Minister of Home Affairs | Etsujirō Uehara | Liberal | January 31, 1947 | May 24, 1947 |
| Minister of Finance; Director-General of the Economic Stabilization Board (until March 20, 1947); Chief of the Price Board (until March 20, 1947) | Tanzan Ishibashi | Independent | May 22, 1946 | May 24, 1947 |
| Minister of Justice | Tokutarō Kimura | Independent | May 22, 1946 | May 24, 1947 |
| Minister of Education | Seiichirō Takahashi | Independent | January 31, 1947 | May 24, 1947 |
| Minister of Health | Yoshinari Kawai | Independent | May 22, 1946 | May 22, 1947 |
| Minister of Health | Shigeru Yoshida (acting) | Liberal | May 22, 1947 | May 24, 1947 |
| Minister of Agriculture, Forestry and Fisheries | Shigeru Yoshida | Liberal | January 31, 1947 | February 15, 1947 |
| Minister of Agriculture, Forestry and Fisheries | Kozaemon Kimura | Democratic | February 15, 1947 | May 24, 1947 |
| Minister of Commerce and Industry | Mitsujirō Ishii | Liberal | January 31, 1947 | May 24, 1947 |
| Minister of Transport | Kaneshichi Masuda | Liberal | January 31, 1947 | May 24, 1947 |
| Minister of Communications | Sadayoshi Hitotsumatsu | Democratic | July 1, 1946 | May 24, 1947 |
| Minister of State; President of the Demobilization Board (from June 15, 1946) | Kijūrō Shidehara | Democratic | May 22, 1946 | May 24, 1947 |
| Minister of State; President of the Administrative Research Board (from October 28, 1946) | Takao Saitō | Democratic | May 22, 1946 | May 24, 1947 |
| Minister of State | Tokujiro Kanamori | Independent | June 19, 1946 | May 24, 1947 |
| Minister of State | Tanzan Ishibashi | Independent | January 31, 1947 | March 20, 1947 |
| Minister of State | Nirō Hoshijima | Liberal | January 31, 1947 | May 24, 1947 |
| Minister of State | Manitsu Tanaka | Democratic | February 26, 1947 | May 24, 1947 |
| Minister of State; Director-General of the Economic Stabilization Board (from March 20, 1947); Chief of the Price Board (from March 20, 1947) | Sōtarō Takase | Independent | March 20, 1947 | May 24, 1947 |
| Chief Cabinet Secretary | Jōji Hayashi | Liberal | May 22, 1946 | May 24, 1947 |
| Director-General of the Cabinet Legislation Bureau | Toshio Irie | Independent | May 22, 1946 | May 24, 1947 |
| Deputy Chief Cabinet Secretary | Shirō Kiuchi | Independent | May 22, 1946 | June 14, 1946 |
| Deputy Chief Cabinet Secretary | Hideo Sutō | Independent | June 14, 1946 | May 24, 1947 |
Parliamentary Vice-Ministers
| Portfolio | Name | Political party | Term start | Term end |
| Parliamentary Vice-Minister for Foreign Affairs | Honda Eisaku | Liberal | March 4, 1947 | May 24, 1947 |
| Parliamentary Vice-Minister of Home Affairs | Hayashi Ren | Democratic | March 4, 1947 | May 24, 1947 |
| Parliamentary Vice-Minister of Finance | Kitamura Tokutarō | Democratic | March 4, 1947 | May 24, 1947 |
| Parliamentary Vice-Minister of Justice | Kitaura Keitarō | Liberal | March 4, 1947 | May 24, 1947 |
| Parliamentary Vice-Minister of Education | Aoki Takayoshi | Liberal | March 4, 1947 | May 24, 1947 |
| Parliamentary Vice-Minister of Agriculture, Forestry and Fisheries | Mori Kōtarō | Liberal | March 4, 1947 | May 24, 1947 |
| Parliamentary Vice Minister of Commerce and Industry | Shigeru Hori | Democratic | March 4, 1947 | April 28, 1947 |
| Parliamentary Vice Minister of Commerce and Industry | Vacancy | | April 28, 1947 | May 24, 1947 |
| Parliamentary Vice-Minister of Transport | Aizawa Kan | Democratic | March 4, 1947 | May 24, 1947 |
| Parliamentary Vice-Minister of Health | Ogasawara Yasomi | Liberal | March 4, 1947 | May 24, 1947 |
| Parliamentary Vice-Minister of Communications | Nakagawa Shigeharu | Democratic | July 1, 1946 | May 24, 1947 |
Parliamentary Undersecretaries
| Portfolio | Name | Political party | Term start | Term end |
| Parliamentary Undersecretary for Foreign Affairs | Kenzaburō Hara | Democratic | March 4, 1947 | May 24, 1947 |
| Parliamentary Undersecretary of Home Affairs | Mikio Mizuta | Liberal | March 4, 1947 | May 24, 1947 |
| Parliamentary Undersecretary of Finance | Takahashi Eikichi | Liberal | March 4, 1947 | May 24, 1947 |
| Parliamentary Undersecretary of Justice | Yoshida An | Democratic | March 4, 1947 | May 24, 1947 |
| Parliamentary Undersecretary of Education | Kawasaki Hideji | Democratic | March 4, 1947 | May 24, 1947 |
| Parliamentary Undersecretary of Agriculture, Forestry and Fisheries | Homma Shunichi | Democratic | March 4, 1947 | May 24, 1947 |
| Parliamentary Undersecretary of Commerce and Industry | Suzuki Sempachi | Liberal | March 4, 1947 | May 24, 1947 |
| Parliamentary Undersecretary of Transport | Vacancy | | March 4, 1947 | May 24, 1947 |
| Parliamentary Undersecretary of Health | Terashima Ryūtarō | Democratic | March 4, 1947 | May 24, 1947 |
| Parliamentary Undersecretary of Communications | Tsubokawa Shinzō | Democratic | March 4, 1947 | May 23, 1947 |
| Parliamentary Undersecretary of Communications | Vacancy | | May 23, 1947 | May 24, 1947 |
