= Shidehara cabinet =

Cabinet of Japan (1945–1946)

Shidehara Cabinet
- 44th Cabinet of Japan

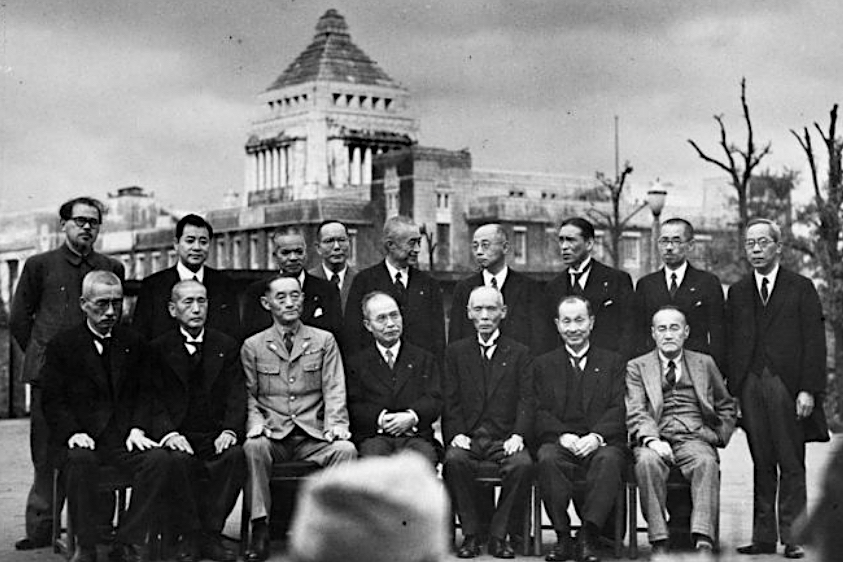
- Date formed: October 9, 1945
- Date dissolved: May 22, 1946

People and organisations
- Emperor: Hirohito
- Prime Minister: Kijūrō Shidehara
- Member parties: (Allied occupation); Liberal Party; Japan Progressive Party; Independent
- Status in legislature: Majority (coalition)

History
- Outgoing election: 1946 Japanese general election
- Legislature term: 89th Imperial Diet
- Predecessor: Higashikuni Cabinet
- Successor: First Yoshida Cabinet

The Shidehara Cabinet is the 44th Cabinet of Japan led by Kijūrō Shidehara from 9 October 1945 to 22 May 1946, during the Allied occupation.

== Cabinet ==
Ministers
Portfolio	Name	Political party	Term start	Term end
Prime Minister	Baron Kijūrō Shidehara	Independent	October 9, 1945	May 22, 1946
Minister for Foreign Affairs	Shigeru Yoshida	Independent	October 9, 1945	May 22, 1946
Minister of Home Affairs	Zenjirō Horikiri	Independent	October 9, 1945	January 13, 1946
Minister of Finance	Viscount Keizo Shibusawa	Independent	October 9, 1945	May 22, 1946
Minister of the Army	Sadamu Shimomura	Military (Army)	October 9, 1945	December 1, 1945
First Minister of Demobilization	Baron Kijūrō Shidehara	Independent	December 1, 1945	May 22, 1946
Minister of the Navy	Mitsumasa Yonai	Military (Navy)	October 9, 1945	December 1, 1945
Second Minister of Demobilization	Baron Kijūrō Shidehara	Independent	December 1, 1945	May 22, 1946
Minister of Justice	Chūzō Iwata	Independent	October 9, 1945	May 22, 1946
Minister of Education	Tamon Maeda	Independent	October 9, 1945	January 13, 1946
Minister of Agriculture, Forestry and Fisheries	Kenzō Matsumura	Progressive	October 9, 1945	January 13, 1946
Minister of Commerce and Industry	Sankurō Ogasawara	Progressive	October 9, 1945	May 22, 1946
Minister of Transport	Takeo Tanaka	Progressive	October 9, 1945	January 13, 1946
Minister of Health	Hitoshi Ashida	Liberal	October 9, 1945	May 22, 1946
Minister of State	Ichizō Kobayashi	Independent	October 9, 1945	March 9, 1946
Minister of State	Jōji Matsumoto	Independent	October 9, 1945	January 13, 1946
Minister of State	Daisaburō Tsugita	Independent	October 9, 1945	May 22, 1946
Chief Cabinet Secretary	Daisaburō Tsugita	Independent	October 9, 1945	January 13, 1946
Deputy Chief Cabinet Secretary	Shigeo Miyoshi	Independent	October 9, 1945	January 13, 1946
Director-General of the Cabinet Legislation Bureau	Wataru Narahashi	Independent	October 9, 1945	January 13, 1946
Parliamentary Vice-Ministers
Portfolio	Name	Political party	Term start	Term end
Parliamentary Vice-Minister for Foreign Affairs	Takeru Inukai	Progressive	October 31, 1945	January 26, 1946
Parliamentary Vice-Minister of Home Affairs	Kawasaki Suegorō	Progressive	October 31, 1945	January 26, 1946
Parliamentary Vice-Minister of Finance	Yutani Yoshiharu	Progressive	October 31, 1945	January 26, 1946
Parliamentary Vice-Minister of the Army	Miyazaki Ichi	Progressive	October 31, 1945	November 30, 1945
First Parliamentary Vice-Minister of Demobilization	Miyazaki Ichi	Progressive	December 1, 1945	January 26, 1946
Parliamentary Vice-Minister of the Navy	Tanaka Ryōichi	Liberal	October 31, 1945	November 30, 1945
Second Parliamentary Vice-Minister of Demobilization	Tanaka Ryōichi	Liberal	December 1, 1945	January 26, 1946
Parliamentary Vice-Minister of Justice	Teshirogi Ryūkichi	Progressive	October 31, 1945	January 26, 1946
Parliamentary Vice-Minister of Education	Michiharu Mishima	Independent	October 31, 1945	January 26, 1946
Parliamentary Vice-Minister of Agriculture, Forestry and Fisheries	Kogure Budayū	Progressive	October 31, 1945	January 26, 1946
Parliamentary Vice Minister of Commerce and Industry	Arai Takaji	Liberal	October 31, 1945	January 26, 1946
Parliamentary Vice-Minister of Transport	Kōro Akira	Liberal	October 31, 1945	January 26, 1946
Parliamentary Vice-Minister of Health	Yano Shōtarō	Progressive	October 31, 1945	January 26, 1946
Parliamentary Undersecretaries
Portfolio	Name	Political party	Term start	Term end
Parliamentary Undersecretary for Foreign Affairs	Matsuura Shūtarō	Progressive	October 31, 1945	January 26, 1946
Parliamentary Undersecretary of Home Affairs	Nakasuke Matsu	Liberal	October 31, 1945	January 26, 1946
Parliamentary Undersecretary of Finance	Yamamoto Kumekichi	Progressive	October 31, 1945	January 26, 1946
Parliamentary Undersecretary of the Army	Noguchi Kiichi	Liberal	October 31, 1945	November 30, 1945
First Parliamentary Undersecretary of Demobilization	Noguchi Kiichi	Liberal	December 1, 1945	January 26, 1946
Parliamentary Undersecretary of the Navy	Hoshino Yasunosuke	Independent	October 31, 1945	November 30, 1945
Second Parliamentary Undersecretary of Demobilization	Hoshino Yasunosuke	Independent	December 1, 1945	January 26, 1946
Parliamentary Undersecretary of Justice	Watanabe Akira	Independent	October 31, 1945	January 26, 1946
Parliamentary Undersecretary of Education	Morita Jūjirō	Progressive	October 31, 1945	January 26, 1946
Parliamentary Undersecretary of Agriculture, Forestry and Fisheries	Hōjō Shunpachi	Independent	October 31, 1945	January 26, 1946
Parliamentary Undersecretary of Commerce and Industry	Vacant		October 31, 1945	November 6, 1945
Parliamentary Undersecretary of Commerce and Industry	Yamane Takeo	Independent	November 6, 1945	January 26, 1946
Parliamentary Undersecretary of Transport	Shirakawa Hisao	Progressive	October 31, 1945	January 26, 1946
Parliamentary Undersecretary of Health	Tanaka Waichirō	Liberal	October 31, 1945	January 26, 1946

== Reshuffled Cabinet ==
A Cabinet reshuffle took place on January 13, 1946.

Ministers
Portfolio	Name	Political party	Term start	Term end
Prime Minister	Baron Kijūrō Shidehara	Progressive	October 9, 1945	May 22, 1946
Minister for Foreign Affairs	Shigeru Yoshida	Independent	October 9, 1945	May 22, 1946
Minister of Home Affairs	Chūzō Mitsuchi	Independent	January 13, 1946	May 22, 1946
Minister of Finance	Viscount Keizo Shibusawa	Independent	October 9, 1945	May 22, 1946
First Minister of Demobilization	Baron Kijūrō Shidehara	Independent	December 1, 1945	May 22, 1946
Second Minister of Demobilization	Baron Kijūrō Shidehara	Independent	December 1, 1945	May 22, 1946
Minister of Justice	Chūzō Iwata	Independent	October 9, 1945	May 22, 1946
Minister of Education	Yoshishige Abe	Independent	January 13, 1946	May 22, 1946
Minister of Agriculture, Forestry and Fisheries	Sempachi Soejima	Independent	January 13, 1946	May 22, 1946
Minister of Commerce and Industry	Sankurō Ogasawara	Progressive	October 9, 1945	May 22, 1946
Minister of Transport	Chūzō Mitsuchi	Independent	January 13, 1946	January 26, 1946
Minister of Transport	Giichi Murakami	Independent	January 26, 1946	May 22, 1946
Minister of Health	Hitoshi Ashida	Liberal	October 9, 1945	May 22, 1946
Minister of State	Ichizō Kobayashi	Independent	October 9, 1945	March 9, 1946
Minister of State	Daisaburō Tsugita	Independent	October 9, 1945	May 22, 1946
Minister of State	Wataru Narahashi	Independent	February 26, 1946	May 22, 1946
Minister of State	Takeshige Ishiguro	Independent	February 26, 1946	May 22, 1946
Chief Cabinet Secretary	Wataru Narahashi	Independent	January 13, 1946	May 22, 1946
Deputy Chief Cabinet Secretary	Vacant		January 13, 1946	March 2, 1946
Deputy Chief Cabinet Secretary	Shirō Kiuchi	Independent	March 2, 1946	May 22, 1946
Director-General of the Cabinet Legislation Bureau	Takeshige Ishiguro	Independent	January 13, 1946	March 19, 1946
Director-General of the Cabinet Legislation Bureau	Toshio Irie	Independent	March 19, 1946	May 22, 1946
Parliamentary Vice-Ministers
Portfolio	Name	Political party	Term start	Term end
Parliamentary Vice-Minister for Foreign Affairs	Takeru Inukai	Progressive	October 31, 1945	May 22, 1946
Parliamentary Vice-Minister of Home Affairs	Kawasaki Suegorō	Progressive	October 31, 1945	May 22, 1946
Parliamentary Vice-Minister of Finance	Yutani Yoshiharu	Progressive	October 31, 1945	May 22, 1946
First Parliamentary Vice-Minister of Demobilization	Vacant		January 26, 1946	May 22, 1946
Second Parliamentary Vice-Minister of Demobilization	Vacant		January 26, 1946	May 22, 1946
Parliamentary Vice-Minister of Justice	Vacant		January 26, 1946	May 22, 1946
Parliamentary Vice-Minister of Education	Michiharu Mishima	Independent	October 31, 1945	May 22, 1946
Parliamentary Vice-Minister of Agriculture, Forestry and Fisheries	Vacant		January 26, 1946	May 22, 1946
Parliamentary Vice Minister of Commerce and Industry	Vacant		January 26, 1946	May 22, 1946
Parliamentary Vice-Minister of Transport	Vacant		January 26, 1946	May 22, 1946
Parliamentary Vice-Minister of Health	Vacant		January 26, 1946	May 22, 1946
Parliamentary Undersecretaries
Portfolio	Name	Political party	Term start	Term end
Parliamentary Undersecretary for Foreign Affairs	Vacant		January 26, 1946	May 22, 1946
Parliamentary Undersecretary of Home Affairs	Vacant		January 26, 1946	May 22, 1946
Parliamentary Undersecretary of Finance	Vacant		January 26, 1946	May 22, 1946
First Parliamentary Undersecretary of Demobilization	Noguchi Kiichi	Liberal	December 1, 1945	May 22, 1946
Second Parliamentary Undersecretary of Demobilization	Hoshino Yasunosuke	Independent	December 1, 1945	May 22, 1946
Parliamentary Undersecretary of Justice	Vacant		January 26, 1946	May 22, 1946
Parliamentary Undersecretary of Education	Vacant		January 26, 1946	May 22, 1946
Parliamentary Undersecretary of Agriculture, Forestry and Fisheries	Vacant		January 26, 1946	May 22, 1946
Parliamentary Undersecretary of Commerce and Industry	Vacant		January 26, 1946	May 22, 1946
Parliamentary Undersecretary of Transport	Vacant		January 26, 1946	May 22, 1946
Parliamentary Undersecretary of Health	Vacant		January 26, 1946	May 22, 1946
