= Mitsujirō Ishii =

Japanese politician (1898-1965)

- 石井 光次郎
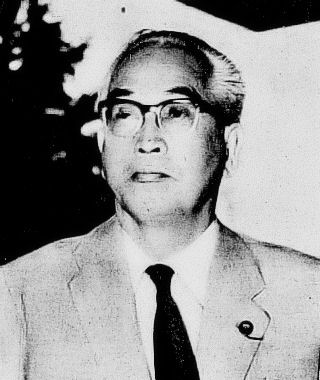
- Ishii in 1960

Speaker of the House of Representatives
- In office 15 February 1967 – 16 July 1969
- Monarch: Hirohito
- Deputy: Sunao Sonoda; Hisao Kodaira
- Preceded by: Kentarō Ayabe
- Succeeded by: Takechiyo Matsuda

Deputy Prime Minister of Japan
- In office 20 May 1957 – 12 June 1958
- Prime Minister: Nobusuke Kishi
- Preceded by: Mamoru Shigemitsu
- Succeeded by: Shūji Masutani
Ministerial offices
Minister of Justice
In office 3 June 1965 – 3 December 1966
Prime Minister	Eisaku Satō
Preceded by	Hitoshi Takahashi
Succeeded by	Isaji Tanaka
Minister of International Trade and Industry
In office 19 July 1960 – 8 December 1960
Prime Minister	Hayato Ikeda
Preceded by	Hayato Ikeda
Succeeded by	Etsusaburo Shiina
Director-General of the Administrative Management Agency
In office 10 July 1957 – 12 June 1958
Prime Minister	Nobusuke Kishi
Preceded by	Tomejirō Ōkubo
Succeeded by	Kikuichirō Yamaguchi
Director-General of the Hokkaido Development Agency
In office 10 July 1957 – 12 June 1958
Prime Minister	Nobusuke Kishi
Preceded by	Morinosuke Kajima
Succeeded by	Kikuichirō Yamaguchi
Minister of Transport
In office 30 October 1952 – 10 December 1954
Prime Minister	Shigeru Yoshida
Preceded by	Giichi Murakami
Succeeded by	Takeo Miki
Minister of Commerce and Industry
In office 31 January 1947 – 24 May 1947
Prime Minister	Shigeru Yoshida
Preceded by	Nirō Hoshijima
Succeeded by	Tetsu Katayama (acting); Chōsaburō Mizutani

Member of the House of Representatives
- In office 1 October 1952 – 13 November 1972
- Preceded by: Ryūno Kiichirō
- Succeeded by: Takato Inatomi
- Constituency: Fukuoka 3rd
- In office 11 April 1946 – 23 December 1948
- Preceded by: Constituency established
- Succeeded by: Ryūno Kiichirō
- Constituency: Fukuoka 1st (1946–1947); Fukuoka 3rd (1947–1948)

Personal details
- Born: 18 August 1889 Kurume, Fukuoka, Japan
- Died: 20 September 1981 (aged 92) Shinjuku, Tokyo, Japan
- Resting place: Aoyama Cemetery
- Party: Liberal Democratic
- Other political affiliations: JLP (1945–1948); DLP (1948–1950); LP (1950–1955)
- Education: Kobe Higher Commercial School; Tokyo Higher Commercial School

Mitsujirō Ishii (石井 光次郎, Ishii Mitsujirō; 18 August 1889 – 20 September 1981) was a Japanese politician who served as Speaker of the House of Representatives from 1967 to 1969 and Deputy Prime Minister from 1957 to 1958, among other cabinet positions. He was a faction leader and candidate for the premiership in the early Liberal Democratic Party (LDP).

Born in Fukuoka Prefecture, Ishii had a business career in Asahi Shimbun Company before entering politics after the war. He was a member of the House of Representatives from 1946 to 1947 and from 1952 to 1972. In 1955, he played a major role in the merger of Japan's conservative parties into the LDP and, in 1956, led a delegation to meet Taiwan's Chiang Kai-shek. Ishii served as cabinet minister at numerous times, beginning with a stint as Minister of Commerce and Industry in 1947. He was Deputy Prime Minister of Japan from 1957 to 1958 and Speaker of the House of Representatives from 1967 to 1969.

== Early life ==
Mitsujiro Ishii was born on 18 August 1889, in Kurume, Fukuoka. Ishii was childhood friends with Shojiro Ishibashi, the founder of Bridgestone, and the two men remained close all their lives. Ishii went on to study at Kobe Commercial High School and afterwards at Tokyo Higher Commercial School, where he graduated in 1914.

After graduating, Ishii was employed at the Tokyo Metropolitan Police Department and served as chief of the Traffic and Public Peace sections. Later he was assigned as chief of the Secretariat and Foreign Affairs sections to the Governor-General of Taiwan. In 1922, he joined the Asahi Shimbun and worked on the business side, rising to become senior mangaging director. He was a close associate of Taketora Ogata, who served as editor-in-chief and later as vice president. Ishii had married a daughter of the politician and industrialist Fusanosuke Kuhara.

Ishii became a disciple of Morihei Ueshiba in 1928 and was an early supporter of Aikido. He was also an avid golfer. Golf was nearly suppressed in Japan during the war, but Ishii, who represented the golf association, convinced the authorities that golf was resurrected form of the ancient game of Dakyu.

== Political career ==
After the war, Ishii was elected to the House of Representatives for the Liberal Party in the 1946 general election. In January 1947, Ishii joined the cabinet of Shigeru Yoshida as Minister of Commerce and Industry, but in May he was purged from public office by the GHQ. Ishii became president of the Japan Golf Association when it was re-founded in 1949. He served briefly as the first president of the Asahi Broadcasting Corporation from 1951 to 1952, but when the purge had been lifted, he returned to political life in the 1952 general election. Ishii then served as minister of transport under Yoshida from 1952 to 1954.

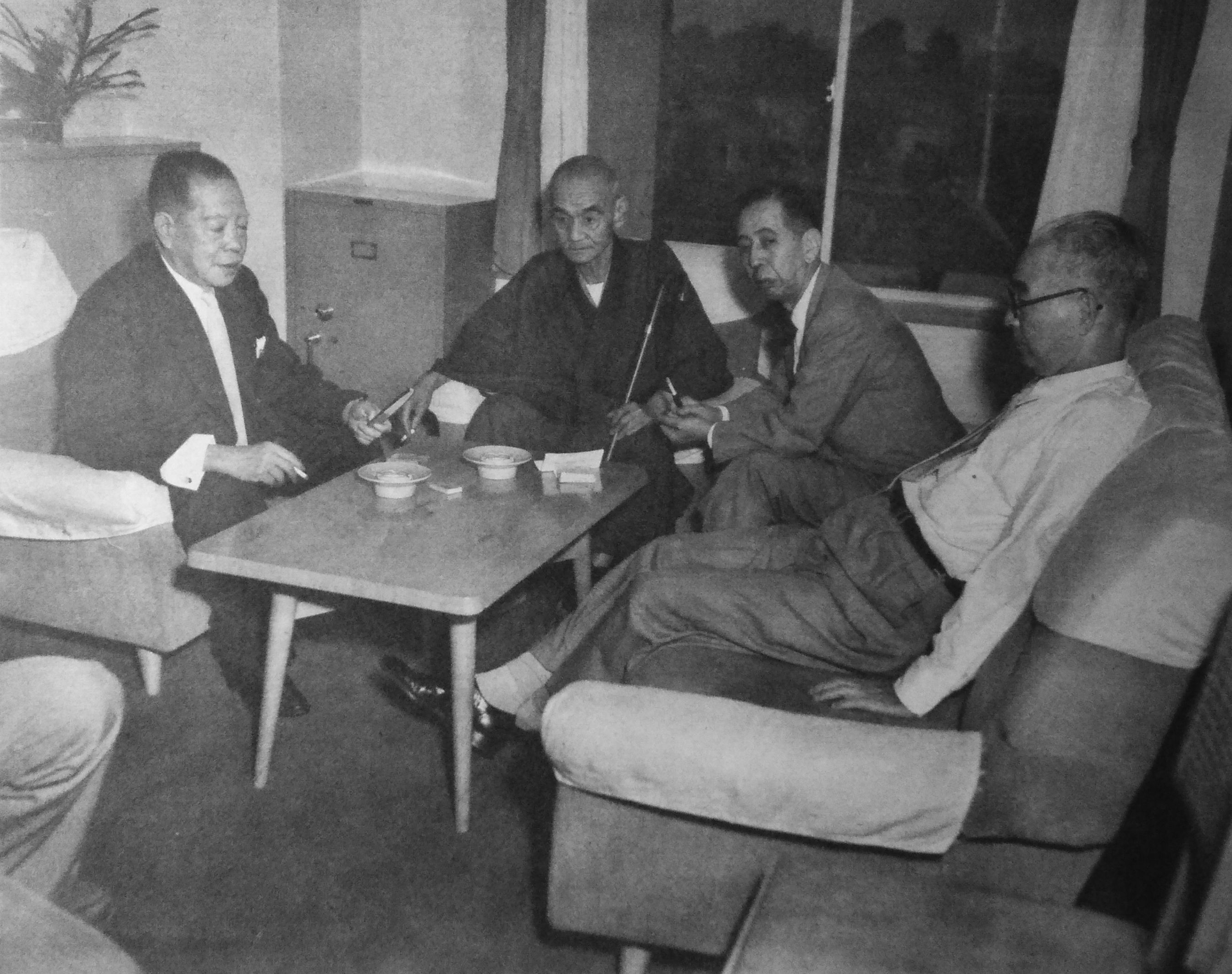
Conservative leaders meet to plot the merger of the Liberal and Democratic parties in July 1955. From left to right: Banboku Ōno, Bukichi Miki, Nobusuke Kishi, Mitsujirō Ishii.

When Yoshida resigned in 1954, Ichirō Hatoyama of the Japan Democratic Party became prime minister and Taketora Ogata became president of the Liberal Party. Ogata appointed Ishii as secretary-general. As such, he played a large part in the merger of the two parties which founded the Liberal Democratic Party in 1955. Ishii became the first chairman of the General Council for the new party.

Ogata died unexpectedly in January 1956 and Ishii inherited his faction in the LDP. In April of the same year, Ishii led a delegation friendship delegation to Taiwan and met with Chiang Kai-shek. Ishii came to be a notable pro-Taiwanese figure in Japanese politics.

In December, Ishii became a candidate in the LDP leadership election to succeed Hatoyama. He placed third after Nobusuke Kishi and Tanzan Ishibashi. The Ishii camp preferred Ishibashi in the runoff vote, narrowly electing him over Kishi. However, Ishibashi resigned due to poor health a few months later and Kishi became prime minister.

Ishii became deputy prime minister when Kishi reshuffled the cabinet in May 1957. Initially he was without portfolio, but in July he was made director general of the Administrative Management Agency and the Hokkaido Development Agency. He served in these roles until June 1958. In 1959 he again became chairman of the General Council.

In May 1960, at the height of the massive Anpo protests against the US-Japan Security Treaty, Ishii banded together with fellow faction leaders Ichirō Kōno, Kenzō Matsumura, Takeo Miki, and Ishibashi Tanzan to try to bring down the Kishi cabinet in response to Kishi's mishandling of the protests and especially his unpopular way of ramming the treaty through the Diet in the "May 19 Incident". When Kishi finally resigned in disgrace in July 1960, Ishii ran in the leadership election to replace him. Hayato Ikeda was the favorite, but still had a public image as a haughty bureaucrat. Many felt that Ishii would have a better chance of reconciling the nation following the protests. Most of the faction heads who did not support Ikeda came to rally behind Ishii, including Banboku Ōno, Ichirō Kōno, Kenzō Matsumura, and Takeo Miki. However, Kishi could not forgive Ishii for having plotted against him, and thus threw the support of his still-powerful faction behind Ikeda, as did Kishi's brother Eisaku Satō. Thus, Ikeda prevailed in the end, but he still made Ishii Minister of International Trade and Industry in his first cabinet as a gesture of reconciliation. However, Ishii soon left the cabinet due to a reshuffle in December.

Ishii returned to the cabinet under Ikeda's successor Eisaku Satō as minister of justice from 1965 to 1966. After the 1967 general election he was elected Speaker of the House of Representatives. He resigned two years later. As an elder statesman, he tended to support Takeo Fukuda, who shared his pro-Taiwanese leanings. Ishii declined to run in the 1972 general election, retiring from politics.

Ishii had served as president of the Japan Golf Association from its foundation in 1949 until 1971. He was chairman of the Japan Sport Association from 1962 to 1975. He was also chairman of the Yokozuna Deliberation Council from 1976 until his death.

Ishii died of heart failure on 20 September 1981, at the age of 92.

== Personal life ==
Ishii and his wife had two sons and two daughters. The eldest son, Kōichirō, was employed at the Bridgestone Corporation founded by his father's friend Shojiro Ishibashi. Kōichirō married Ishibashi's fourth daughter Tamako. After holding several executive positions, he became president of the subsidiary Bridgestone Cycle. He was also a vice president of Nippon Kaigi.

Their second daughter Yoshiko was a prominent chanson singer, pioneering the style in Japan.

Political offices
Preceded by Kentarō Ayabe	Speaker of the House of Representatives; 1967–1969	Succeeded by Takechiyo Matsuda
Preceded by Hitoshi Takahashi	Minister of Justice; 1965–1966	Succeeded by Isaji Tanaka
Preceded by Hayato Ikeda	Minister of International Trade and Industry; 1960	Succeeded by Etsusaburo Shiina
Preceded by Mamoru Shigemitsu	Deputy Prime Minister; 1957–1958	Succeeded by Shūji Masutani
Preceded by Tomejirō Ōkubo	Director General of the Administrative Management Agency; 1957–1958	Succeeded by Kikuichirō Yamaguchi
Preceded by Morinosuke Kajima	Director General of the Hokkaido Development Agency; 1957–1958	Succeeded by Kikuichirō Yamaguchi
Preceded by Giichi Murakami	Minister of Transport; 1952–1954	Succeeded by Takeo Miki
Preceded by Jirō Hoshijima	Minister of Commerce and Industry; 1947	Succeeded by Chōsaburō Mizutani
Party political offices
Preceded by Shūji Masutani	Chairman of the General Affairs Council of the Liberal Democratic Party; 1959–1960	Succeeded by Shigeru Hori
New office	Chairman of the General Affairs Council of the Liberal Democratic Party; 1955–1956	Succeeded by Shigemasa Sunada
Preceded by Hayato Ikeda	Secretary General of the Liberal Party; 1954–1955	Office abolished
Other offices
Preceded by Seiichi Funahashi	Chairman of the Yokozuna Deliberation Council; 1976–1981	Succeeded by Yoshitaka Takahashi
Preceded by Juichi Tsushima	Chairman of the Japan Sport Association; 1962–1975	Succeeded by Kenzō Kōno
