= Kenzaburo Hara =

Japanese politician

- 原 健三郎

Speaker of the House of Representatives
- In office 22 July 1986 – 2 June 1989
- Monarchs: Hirohito; Akihito
- Deputy: Shinnen Tagaya
- Preceded by: Michita Sakata
- Succeeded by: Hajime Tamura

Director-General of the Hokkaido Development Agency
- In office 17 July 1980 – 30 November 1981
- Prime Minister: Zenkō Suzuki
- Preceded by: Masaharu Gotōda
- Succeeded by: Yukiyasu Matsuno

Director-General of the National Land Agency
- In office 17 July 1980 – 30 November 1981
- Prime Minister: Zenkō Suzuki
- Preceded by: Kiyomitsu Sonoda
- Succeeded by: Yukiyasu Matsuno

Minister of Labour
- In office 5 July 1971 – 28 January 1972
- Prime Minister: Eisaku Satō
- Preceded by: Masakatsu Nohara
- Succeeded by: Toshio Tsukahara
- In office 30 November 1968 – 14 January 1970
- Prime Minister: Eisaku Satō
- Preceded by: Heiji Ogawa
- Succeeded by: Masakatsu Nohara

Vice Speaker of the House of Representatives
- In office 8 June 1961 – 23 October 1963
- Speaker: Ichirō Kiyose
- Preceded by: Tsurumatsu Kubota
- Succeeded by: Isaji Tanaka

Member of the House of Representatives
- In office 11 April 1946 – 2 June 2000
- Preceded by: Constituency established
- Succeeded by: Multi-member district
- Constituency: Hyōgo 1st (1946–1947); Hyōgo 2nd (1947–1996); Kinki PR (1996–2000)

Personal details
- Born: 6 February 1907 Hokudan, Hyōgo, Japan
- Died: 6 November 2004 (aged 97) Shibuya, Tokyo, Japan
- Party: Liberal Democratic
- Other political affiliations: JPP (1946–1947); DP (1947); Dōshi Club (1947–1948); DLP (1948–1950); LP (1950–1955)
- Education: Waseda University; University of Oregon

Kenzaburo Hara (原 健三郎, Hara Kenzaburō, 6 February 1907 – 7 November 2004) was a Japanese politician who served as Speaker of the House of Representatives from 1986 to 1989. He was a member of the House for 54 years from 1946 until he retired in 2000, and died of heart failure in Tokyo at the age of 97.

== Early life ==
Hara was born in Hokudan, on an island in the Awaji island group, in Hyogo Prefecture in 1907. After graduating from the political and economic department of Waseda University and the graduate course of the University of Oregon, he joined Kodansha Ltd., a major publishing house. He served as managing editor of the "Gendai" magazine before becoming a legislator. He is also known as either the original author or scenario writer of five of the nine movies in the popular "Wataridori" ("Migratory Bird") series produced by Nikkatsu Corp.

== Political career ==
Hara was first elected to the Diet in Japan's first post-war Lower House election held in 1946 with the backing of the now defunct Japan Progressive Party. He later joined the ruling Liberal Democratic Party (LDP). He had served 20 terms, totaling 54 years, as a Lower House member until he retired from politics at the age of 93 in June 2000 shortly before a general election. Hara was the second longest serving legislator in the post-war period next only to former prime minister Yasuhiro Nakasone.

After serving as labour minister and director general of the National Land Agency and the Hokkaido Development Agency, he served as Lower House speaker from July 1986 to June 1989.

Known to his constituents by the nickname "Haraken", Hara was one of the most influential politicians in Japan during the 20th century. He served as a legislator for over half the century and became the Speaker of the Lower House. He was first elected in 1946 as General Douglas MacArthur arrived to oversee the occupation and reconstruction of Japan, following its surrender at the end of World War II. As one of the few legislators to speak proficient English, Hara was invited into the deliberations of MacArthur's inner circle. Hara made controversial statements as measured by western standards. He was criticized for saying, "Those who'll go to nursing care homes for the aged [after they grow old] are the worst," in a speech he delivered in a Coming-of-the-Age Day ceremony in Sumoto, Awaji Island, in January 1972. He had publicly pledged to voters in his home constituency that the Akashi Strait Bridge between Kobe and Awaji Island would be built. As a sign of the influence he wielded, the bridge was opened to traffic in April 1998.
