= Higashikuni cabinet =

Cabinet of Japan (August 17 - October 9, 1945)

Higashikuni Cabinet
- 43rd Cabinet of Japan

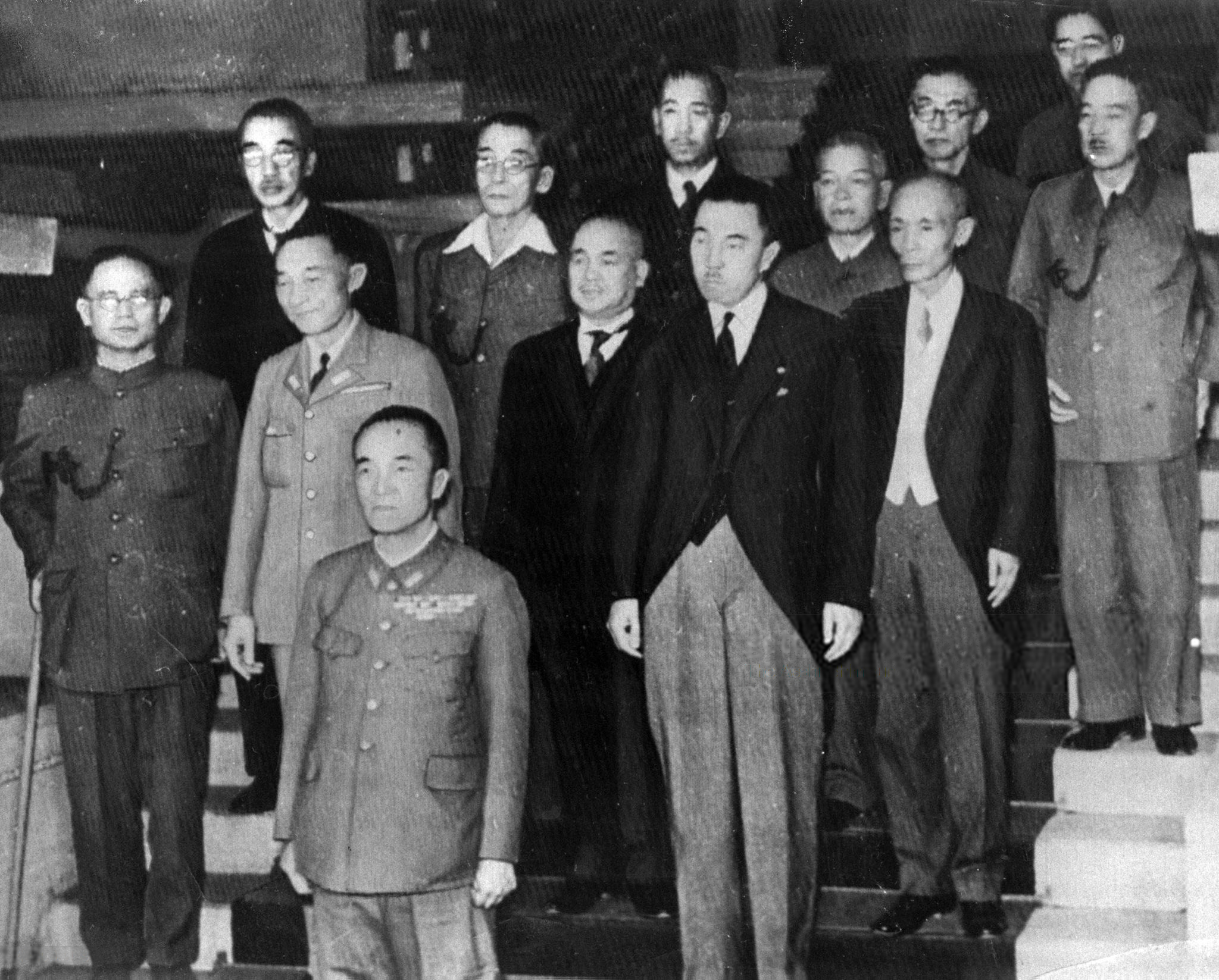
- Date formed: August 17, 1945
- Date dissolved: October 9, 1945

People and organisations
- Emperor: Hirohito
- Prime Minister: Prince Naruhiko Higashikuni
- Member party: (Allied Occupation: 28 August 1945 - 28 April 1952); Independent; Military
- Status in legislature: Majority (coalition)

History
- Legislature term: 87th Imperial Diet
- Predecessor: Kantarō Suzuki Cabinet
- Successor: Shidehara Cabinet

The Higashikuni Cabinet is the 43rd Cabinet of Japan led by Prince Naruhiko Higashikuni from August 17 to October 9, 1945.

The Allied occupation began on 28 August 1945 following the surrender of Japan. The Cabinet's principal task was to preserve the integrity of the Japanese government in the chaotic aftermath of the Kyūjō incident and oversee the disbanding of the Imperial Japanese Army and Navy. Following a dispute with Allied commanders over the repeal of the Peace Preservation Law, the Cabinet resigned on 9 October and was succeeded by the Shidehara Cabinet.

== Cabinet ==
Ministers
Portfolio	Name	Political party	Term start	Term end
Prime Minister	Prince Naruhiko Higashikuni	Imperial Family	August 17, 1945	October 9, 1945
Minister for Foreign Affairs	Mamoru Shigemitsu	Independent	August 17, 1945	September 17, 1945
Minister for Foreign Affairs	Shigeru Yoshida	Independent	September 17, 1945	October 9, 1945
Minister of Home Affairs	Iwao Yamazaki	Independent	August 17, 1945	October 9, 1945
Minister of Finance	Juichi Tsushima	Independent	August 17, 1945	October 9, 1945
Minister of the Army	Prince Naruhiko Higashikuni	Imperial Family	August 17, 1945	August 23, 1945
Minister of the Army	Sadamu Shimomura	Military (Army)	August 23, 1945	October 9, 1945
Minister of the Navy	Mitsumasa Yonai	Military (Navy)	August 17, 1945	October 9, 1945
Minister of Justice	Chūzō Iwata	Independent	August 17, 1945	October 9, 1945
Minister of Education	Kenzō Matsumura	Independent	August 17, 1945	August 18, 1945
Minister of Education	Tamon Maeda	Independent	August 18, 1945	October 9, 1945
Minister of Health	Kenzō Matsumura	Independent	August 17, 1945	October 9, 1945
Minister of Greater East Asia	Mamoru Shigemitsu	Independent	August 17, 1945	August 26, 1945
Minister of Agriculture and Commerce	Kōtarō Sengoku	Independent	August 17, 1945	August 26, 1945
Minister of Agriculture, Forestry and Fisheries	Kōtarō Sengoku	Independent	August 26, 1945	October 9, 1945
Minister of Munitions	Chikuhei Nakajima	Independent	August 17, 1945	August 26, 1945
Minister of Commerce and Industry	Chikuhei Nakajima	Independent	August 26, 1945	October 9, 1945
Minister of Transport	Naoto Kobiyama	Independent	August 17, 1945	October 9, 1945
Minister of State	Prince Fumimaro Konoe	Independent	August 17, 1945	October 9, 1945
Minister of State	Taketora Ogata	Independent	August 17, 1945	October 9, 1945
Minister of State	Toshirō Obata	Military (Army)	August 19, 1945	October 9, 1945
Chief Cabinet Secretary	Taketora Ogata	Independent	August 17, 1945	October 9, 1945
Deputy Chief Cabinet Secretary	Sōkichi Takagi	Military (Navy)	September 19, 1945	October 9, 1945
Director-General of the Cabinet Legislation Bureau	Naokai Murase	Independent	August 17, 1945	October 9, 1945
