= Fourth department =

The Fourth Department or fourth department may refer to:

- Fourth Department of the Cabinet Legislation Bureau of Japan
- Fourth Department of the New York Supreme Court, Appellate Division
- Fourth Department of the People's Liberation Army of China
- Fourth Department of the Vicariate of Rome; see Cardinal Vicar § Fourth department
- Older name of Soviet military intelligence, now Russian Federation's Main Intelligence Directorate
