= Tokujiro Kanamori =

Japanese politician

- 金森 徳次郎
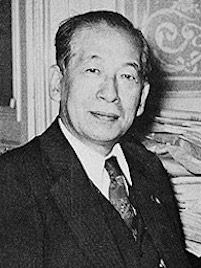
- Tokujiro Kanamori

Director-General of the Legislative Bureau
- In office 10 July 1934 – 11 January 1936
- Prime Minister: Keisuke Okada
- Preceded by: Teizō Kurosaki
- Succeeded by: Hachirō Ōhashi

Member of the House of Peers
- In office 5 February 1946 – 2 May 1947 Nominated by the Emperor

Personal details
- Born: 17 March 1886 Nagoya, Aichi, Japan
- Died: 16 June 1959 (aged 73)
- Education: Tokyo Imperial University

Tokujiro Kanamori (金森 徳次郎, Kanamori Tokujirō; 17 March 1886 – 16 June 1959) was a Japanese politician. He was a major figure in the implementation of the postwar Japanese Constitution.

Kanamori was born in 1886 in Aichi Prefecture. He graduated from Tokyo University in 1912 with a degree in Law, and started work for the Ministry of Finance. In 1924, he was appointed as Director of the new Cabinet Legislation Bureau (the first person to hold this post) and he subsequently became Director-General of the Bureau a decade later. He was, however, pressured into resigning only two years later, due to sympathies with the controversial "Emperor Organ" theory proposed by Tatsukichi Minobe. Nevertheless, he remained a respected constitutional scholar, who had published several books on the Meiji Constitution. He was consulted on the wording of the new constitution by Toshio Irie.

His election to the House of Peers in 1946 marked the start of his return to politics. He was elected as Minister of State in the first cabinet of Shigeru Yoshida, and in this capacity argued forcefully in favour of the new postwar constitution. In the course of 114 days of debate, Kanamori responded to over a thousand questions, with extensive responses that took up to one and a half hours. After the implementation of the new legislation, Kanamori helped to form the Kenpō Fukyū Kai (Constitution Popularization Society) in December 1946, and published books and tracts to spread awareness of the new laws throughout the population.

In 1948 he became the first librarian of the National Diet Library, a post he held until his death in 1959.
