= Kenpō Fukyū Kai =

Japanese group promoting the reformed Constitution

The Kenpō Fukyū Kai (ja:憲法普及会; Constitution Popularisation Society) was a Japanese group founded in 1946 to promote the reformed Constitution of Japan.

After World War II, the Allied occupation required that the existing Meiji Constitution of Japan be amended to replace the absolute rule of the Emperor with a liberal democracy. As part of the process of implementing the changes to legislation that resulted, the Yoshida administration formed the Kenpō Fukyū Kai, with the mandate to "thoroughly popularize the spirit of the new Constitution through activities to raise awareness of it so as to touch every aspect of the lives of the citizens." The Society was officially established on December 1, 1946. Hitoshi Ashida was the Chairman, Kanamori Tokujiro was Deputy Chairman and Toshiyoshi Miyazawa was Secretary. Offices of the society were set up throughout Japan to popularise the Constitution at a local level.

In February 1947, the Society held a series of lectures at Tokyo University, aimed at training government officials in the changes to the Constitution. Around 50,000 copies of the transcripts of these lectures were published under the title Lectures on the New Constitution, and were used as a reference aid and training tool for the bureaucrats and civil servants tasked with implementing the new laws. To inform the general population of the changes in legislation, the Society published a number of pamphlets and booklets detailing the amendments; chief among these was New Constitution - Bright Life (新しい憲法 明るい生活), around 20,000,000 copies of which were printed. It was circulated to every household in Japan.

Under 1947's Fundamental Law on Education, children and young people in education were required to be informed about the new Constitution. To this end, the Society produced a number of simplified books aimed at children, using the New Education Promotion Society's Constitution for Children.

When the Constitution was enacted on May 3, 1947, the Society held a major celebratory event at the Imperial Theatre, which was attended by members of the Imperial Family and representatives of the Allied Powers. The Society continued to operate for a year or so after the establishment of the Constitution.
