= Kenzō Matsumura =

Japanese politician (1890-1964)

- 松村 謙三
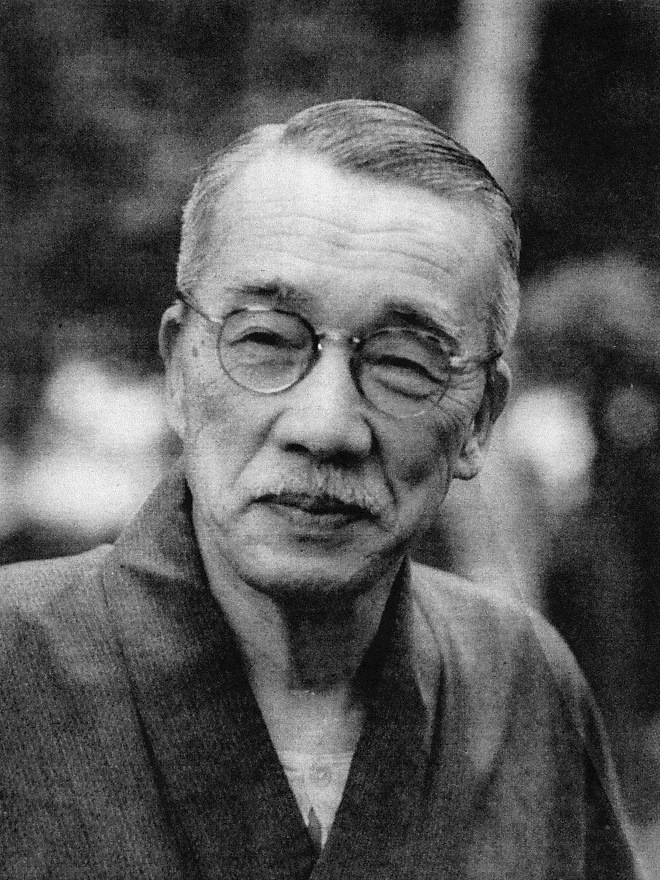
- Matsumura in 1954

Minister of Education
- In office 18 March 1955 – 21 November 1955
- Prime Minister: Ichirō Hatoyama
- Preceded by: Masazumi Andō
- Succeeded by: Ichirō Kiyose

Minister of Agriculture and Forestry
- In office 9 October 1945 – 13 January 1946
- Prime Minister: Kijūrō Shidehara
- Preceded by: Kōtarō Sengoku
- Succeeded by: Senpachi Soejima

Minister of Health and Welfare
- In office 17 August 1945 – 9 October 1945
- Prime Minister: Prince Higashikuni
- Preceded by: Tadahiko Okada
- Succeeded by: Hitoshi Ashida

Member of the House of Representatives
- In office 2 October 1952 – 2 December 1969
- Preceded by: Naoji Tachibana
- Succeeded by: Minoru Yoshida
- Constituency: Toyama 2nd
- In office 21 February 1928 – 18 December 1945
- Preceded by: Constituency established
- Succeeded by: Constituency abolished
- Constituency: Toyama 2nd

Personal details
- Born: 24 January 1883 Fukumitsu, Toyama, Japan
- Died: 21 August 1971 (aged 88)
- Party: Liberal Democratic
- Other political affiliations: CDP (1928–1940); IRAA (1940–1945); JPP (1945–1946); Kaishintō (1952–1954); JDP (1954–1955)
- Education: Waseda University

Kenzō Matsumura (松村 謙三, Matsumura Kenzō; 24 January 1883 – 21 August 1971) was a Japanese politician in the prewar and postwar periods, serving stints in the cabinet as Minister of Health and Welfare, Minister of Agriculture and Forestry, and Minister of Education. Matsumura is remembered for his mastery of arcane details of Japanese agricultural policy, as well as for, in his later years, his tireless efforts to normalize Japanese diplomatic and trade relations with China, which he viewed as essential for Japan to chart a course on the international stage more independent from the United States.

== Early life and education ==
Kenzō Matsumura was born on 24 January 1883, in Nishinami district, Fukumitsu, Toyama Prefecture, the eldest son of a wealthy landowner who ran an apothecary shop. His biological mother left the family for unknown reasons when he was two years old and he was raised by his stepmother, alongside a half-brother and half-sister. In 1902 he entered Waseda University, where his undergraduate thesis titled "Theory of Japanese Agricultural Panics" presaged his lifelong interest in agricultural policy. After graduating with a degree in political economy in 1906, he joined the staff of the Hōchi Shimbun newspaper. However, in 1912, his father died and he returned to Fukumitsu to take over the family apothecary business.

== Political career ==
In 1917, Matsumura was elected to the Fukumitsu town assembly, and in 1920, he was elected as a member of the Toyama prefectural assembly. In 1928 he was elected to the House of Representatives as a candidate for the Minseitō party, representing Toyama prefecture's second district. In total he would be elected or reelected to represent this district 13 times.

After many years as a loyal Minseitō backbencher with growing expertise in agricultural policy, by 1938 Matsumura had risen to become the Chairman of the Minseitō's Policy Research Council, and in January 1939 he was appointed Vice-Minister of Agriculture and Forestry in the Hiranuma Cabinet.

In 1942, he was reelected as a "recommended" candidate of the Imperial Rule Assistance Association, signaling his collaboration with the wartime one-party state that he would later name as one of his life's greatest regrets. But Matsumura's collaboration was more than partial, as in 1944 he chaired the Imperial Rule Assistance Political Association's Policy Research Council, and in 1945 he was named its Secretary-General. Finally in late 1945, Matsumura served brief stints as Minister of Health and Welfare and Minister of Education in the Higashikuni Cabinet and Minister of Agriculture in the Shidehara Cabinet before he was purged from all government offices by the US occupation authorities as a collaborator with the wartime militarist regime.

During his time as a purged politician, Matsumura made pocket money by farming shiitake mushrooms and survived by gradually selling off the forest lands in Fukumitsu that he had inherited from his father. He also started cultivating Chinese orchids that he purchased via mail order from all around Japan. It was during this time that he started a personal annual tradition of presenting a Chinese orchid to the Empress each year.

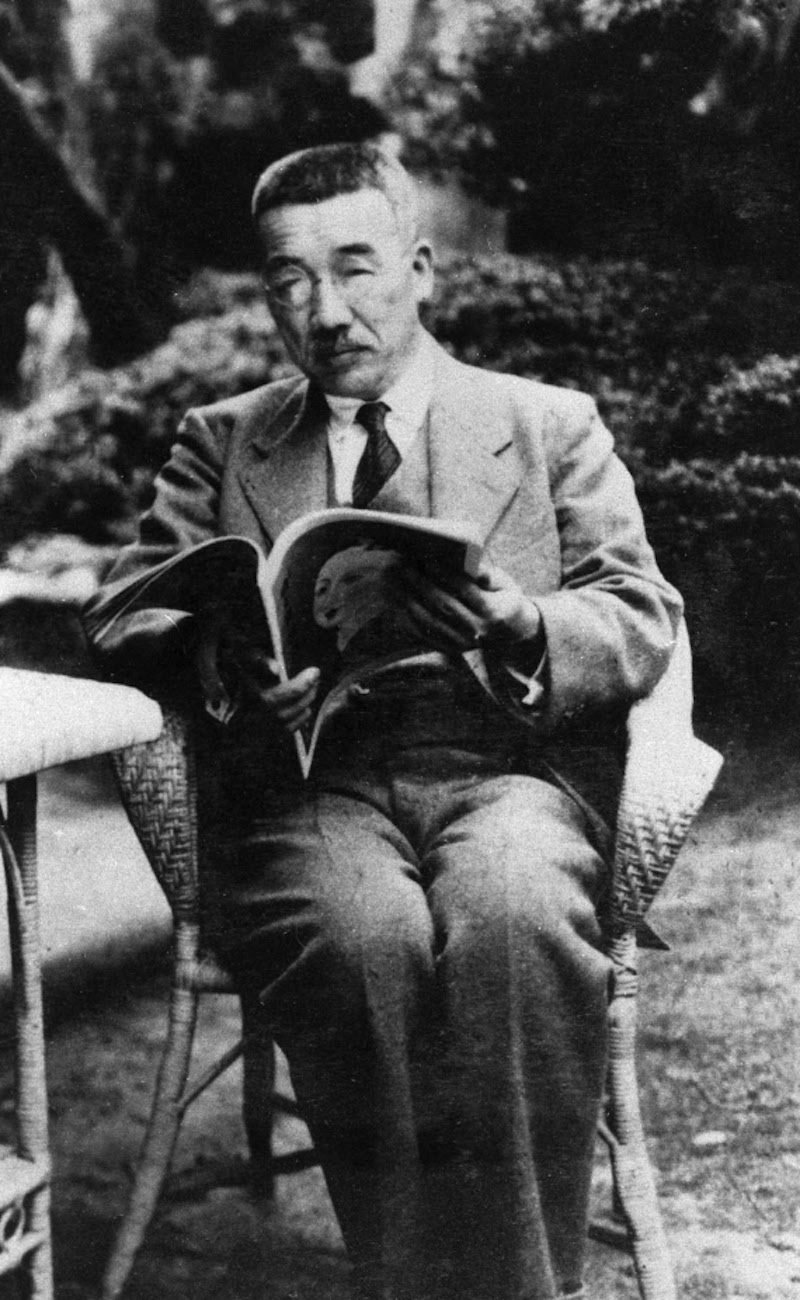
Matsumura in 1942

In 1951, Matsumura was de-purged and immediately set about attempting to foment political opposition to the government of Prime Minister Yoshida Shigeru, who represented the "ex-bureaucrat" faction in Japan's conservative political firmament, as opposed to the "party politician faction" to which Matsumura belonged. In 1952, Matsumura helped establish the Reform Party to challenge Yoshida, and later was one of the founders of the Democratic Party in 1954, chairing the new party's Policy Research Council. In 1955, Matsumura served as Minister of Education in the Second Hatoyama Cabinet. During this timeframe, Matsumura staunchly opposed the unification of the conservative parties to form the new Liberal Democratic Party (LDP), not wishing to make common cause with ex-bureaucrats, but he was outmaneuvered by his political opponents, including future prime minister Kishi Nobusuke. Matsumura became the leader of one of the main LDP factions, consisting largely of former Minseitō party politicians. For strategic purposes, Matsumura's faction soon merged with the faction led by Matsumura's fellow former Reform Party comrade Takeo Miki, in an unusual arrangement featuring Matsumura and Miki as co-equal leaders of the faction. Originally, Matsumura was considered the main power-broker within the faction, causing it to be called the "Matsumura-Miki faction" by outsiders, but as Miki's star rose and Matsumura's faded, it eventually came to be called the "Miki-Matsumura faction," and finally just the "Miki faction."

In 1959, Matsumura was still at the apex of his political power and influence, and challenged Prime Minister Nobusuke Kishi for the presidency of the LDP as the unified candidate of the LDP "anti-mainstream," but was easily defeated by a tally of 320 votes to 166. This is the closest Matsumura would come to the premiership in his political career.

In addition to agricultural policy, Miki had a strong interest in improving Japanese relations with China, and was harshly critical of Kishi's regime, not only because Kishi was an ex-bureaucrat, but also because Matsumura viewed Kishi's policies, especially his attempt to revise the U.S.-Japan Security Treaty and thereby firmly align Japan with the United States, as endangering Japan's relations with China. In 1959, Matsumura traveled to China and met with Chinese premier Zhou Enlai, hoping to expand trade relations with China in defiance of Kishi and the United States.

The following year, Matsumura was harshly critical of Kishi's mis-handling of the massive 1960 Anpo protests against the Security Treaty. When Kishi rammed the treaty through the Diet on 19 May 1960, Matsumura's faction absented itself from the vote in protest of Kishi's heavy-handed approach. On May 28, Matsumura and Miki issued a public call for Kishi's resignation, and Kishi was ultimately forced to resign in July. However, when Ichirō Kōno floated a plan later that summer to split up the LDP and form a new splinter party of party politicians, Matsumura and Miki ultimately declined to support him. As punishment for taking part in the anti-Kishi rebellion, Kishi made sure that Matsumura was excluded from the cabinets of Kishi's successor Hayato Ikeda, and his star began to fade within the LDP.

In 1962, Matsumura made another trip to China, where he was instrumental in negotiating the Liao-Takasaki Trade Agreement. This agreement paved the way for the resumption of a small amount of unofficial "friendship" trade between Japan and China, but trade with China still remained less than 1 percent of Japan's overall trade, and the Japanese government's stated policy was to continue the US line of isolating China diplomatically and economically.

Although Ikeda was re-elected as LDP party president in 1964, he retired soon afterwards due to illness. In the debate over who would succeed Ikeda as prime minister, Matsumura supported veteran party politician Ichirō Kōno, who favored dramatically increasing trade with China, whereas Miki broke ranks with Matsumura and supported Kishi's brother Eisaku Satō, an ex-bureaucrat who promised to maintain low levels of trade in accordance with US wishes. This led to a falling out between Matsumura and his erstwhile ally Miki, and thereafter the two men went their separate ways. Miki was rewarded for his support with powerful posts in the Satō cabinet, whereas Matsumura continued to be excluded. Matsumura's lack of access to power led to defections from his ever-shrinking faction; his most loyal remaining lieutenants begged him to retire and step aside for a younger leader, but Matsumura refused, and his faction sank into irrelevance and eventually disappeared, while Miki's gained strength and eventually Miki would rise to become prime minister in 1974.

Finally, in 1969, Matsumura's eldest son convinced him to retire from politics. In 1970, he made one last mission to China, as part of a non-sanctioned trip to introduce former foreign minister former Foreign Minister Aiichiro Fujiyama to Zhou Enlai. Matsumura died 21 August 1971, at the age of 88, just one year before seeing his long-held dream of China and Japan normalizing diplomatic and trade relations come to pass. He was posthumously awarded the Order of the Paulownia Flowers.
