= Saitō Takao (politician) =

Japanese politician (1870–1949)

- 斎藤 隆夫
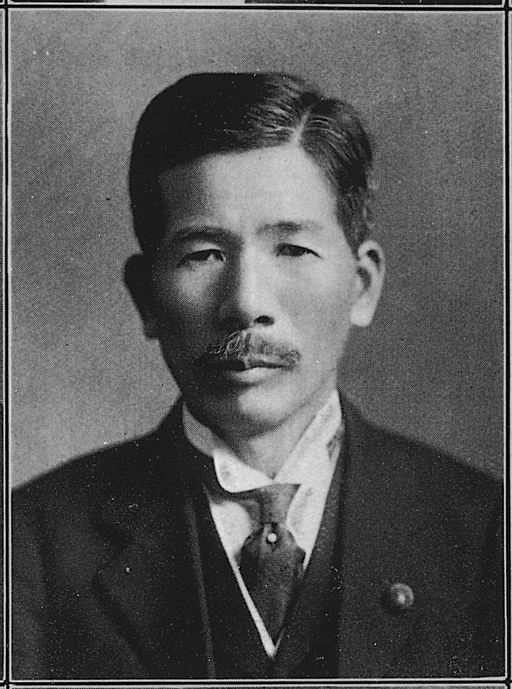
- Saitō in 1920

Director-General of the Administrative Management Agency
- In office 28 October 1946 – 10 March 1948
- Prime Minister: Shigeru Yoshida; Tetsu Katayama
- Preceded by: Office established
- Succeeded by: Kyōji Funada

Member of the House of Representatives
- In office 1 May 1942 – 7 October 1949
- Preceded by: Himself (1940)
- Succeeded by: Tetsuzo Kojima
- Constituency: Hyōgo 5th (1942–1946); Hyōgo 2nd (1946–1947); Hyōgo 5th (1947–1949)
- In office 10 May 1924 – 7 March 1940
- Preceded by: Saburōbē Kamata
- Succeeded by: Himself (1942)
- Constituency: Hyōgo 13th (1924–1928); Hyōgo 5th (1928–1940)
- In office 17 May 1912 – 26 February 1920
- Preceded by: Multi-member district
- Succeeded by: Constituency abolished
- Constituency: Hyōgo Counties

Personal details
- Born: 13 September 1870 Izushi, Hyōgo, Japan
- Died: 7 October 1949 (aged 79) Bunkyō, Tokyo, Japan
- Resting place: Aoyama Cemetery
- Party: Democratic Liberal (1948–1949)
- Other political affiliations: Rikken Kokumintō (1912–1913); Rikken Dōshikai (1913–1916); Kenseikai (1916–1927); Rikken Minseitō (1927–1940); Independent (1940–1945); Progressive (1945–1947); Democratic (1947); Dōshi Club (1947–1948)
- Education: Waseda University; Yale University

Saitō Takao (斎藤 隆夫; 13 September 1870 – 7 October 1949) was a Japanese politician and longtime member of the Imperial Diet as a member of the Rikken Minseitō party. He was born in the village of Izushi-gun in Hyōgo and in the Diet represented the rural Tajima area.

In the 1890s, he studied at Waseda University (then known as Tōkyō Senmon Gakkō), where he was one the few to pass the bar examinations. He later briefly studied at Yale, but after a lengthy decline in health, he turned from academics to politics.

He served in the National Diet almost continuously since his first election in 1912. He acquired a reputation as a "clean" candidate, who favored universal male suffrage and constitutionalism.

In the 1930s, he developed a reputation as an opponent of the emerging militaristic policies and its hypocritical slogans. However, he was a conservative who did not object on principles to the Meiji order and the military, and he opposed state intervention in economic matters unlike those with fascist or socialist tendencies.

On 2 February 1940, he made a speech in which he sharply questioned the prosecution and justification of Japan's "holy war" in China, and he stressed the importance of political pragmatism over idealism and lofty notions. That caused the Diet to vote overwhelmingly for his expulsion on 7 March 1940.

Many of those who opposed him were reformists and progressives like Inejirō Asanuma, who would later become a prominent Japan Socialist Party leader. His speech also led to the creation of the League of Diet Members Believing the Objectives of the Holy War by Fumimaro Konoe, who was his main target. Saitō was easily re-elected to the Diet in 1942, one indication of his popularity among his constituents.

After the surrender of Japan in 1945, he was one of the politicians that participated in the Allied Occupation's efforts to democratize Japan.

== See also ==
- Opposition at home to the Japanese government (World War II)
