= 1946 Japanese general election =

- 10 April 1946

All 468 seats in the House of Representatives 235 seats needed for a majority
- Registered: 36,878,417 (▲152.7%) (Note: The electorate more than doubled as a result of Japanese women being allowed to vote for the first time)
- Turnout: 72.08% (▼11.08 pp)
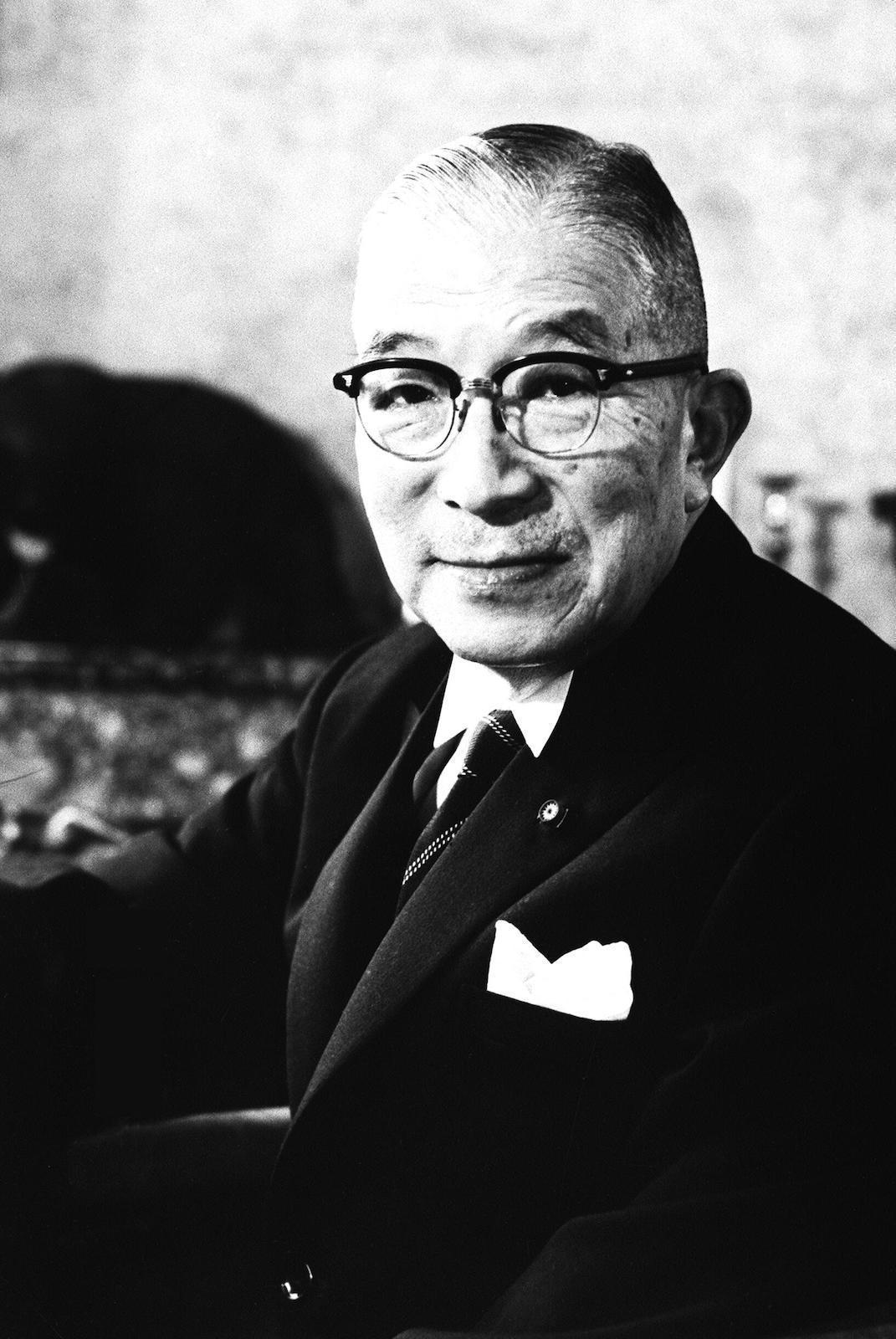

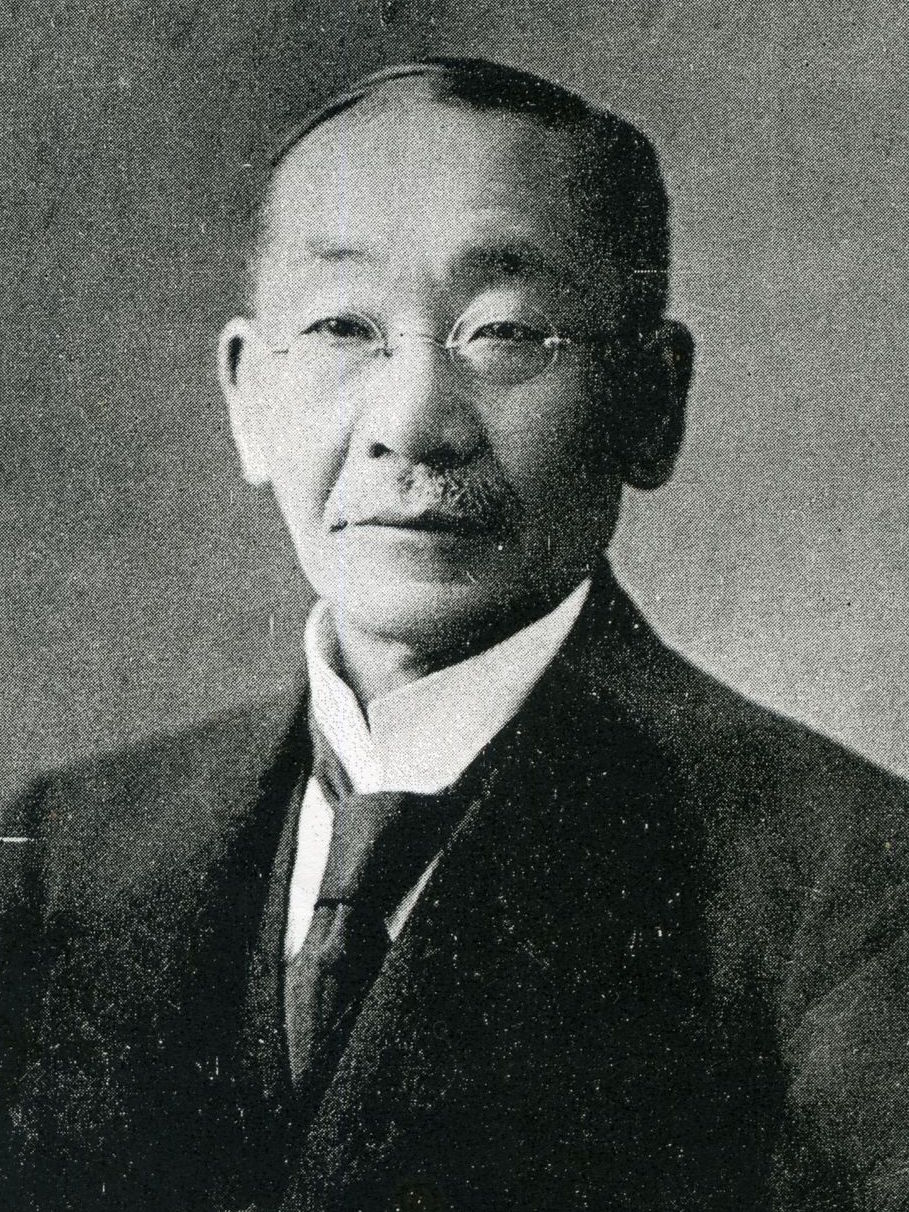

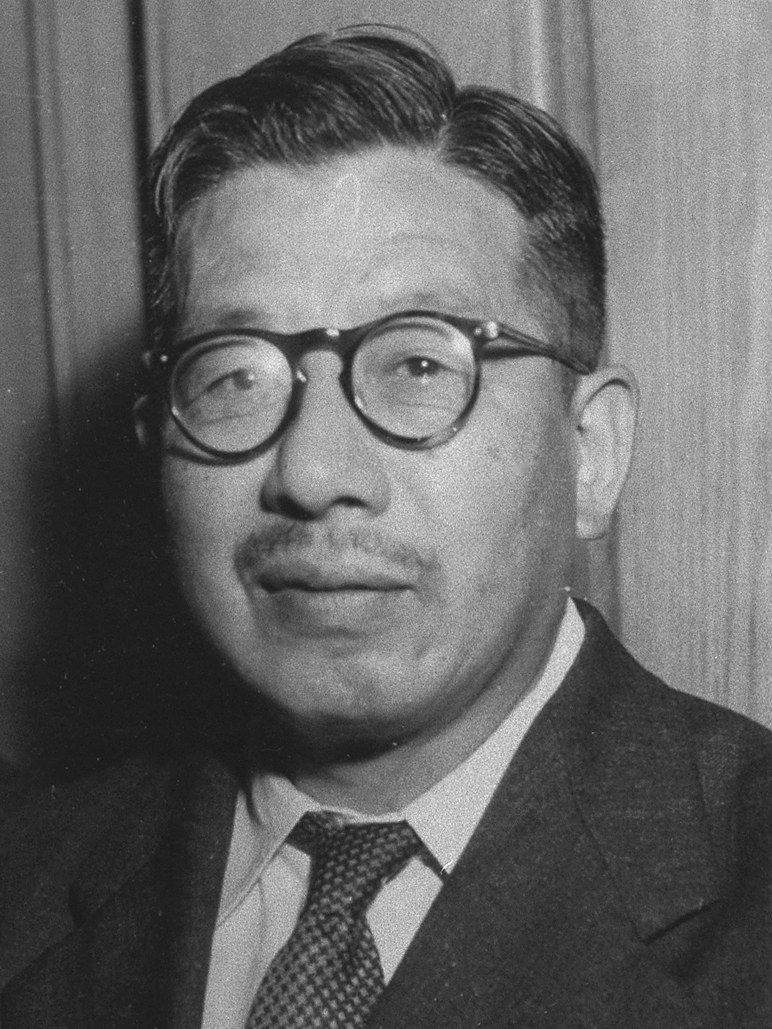

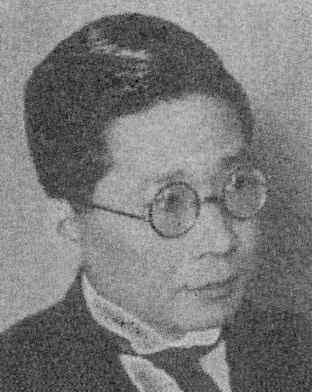

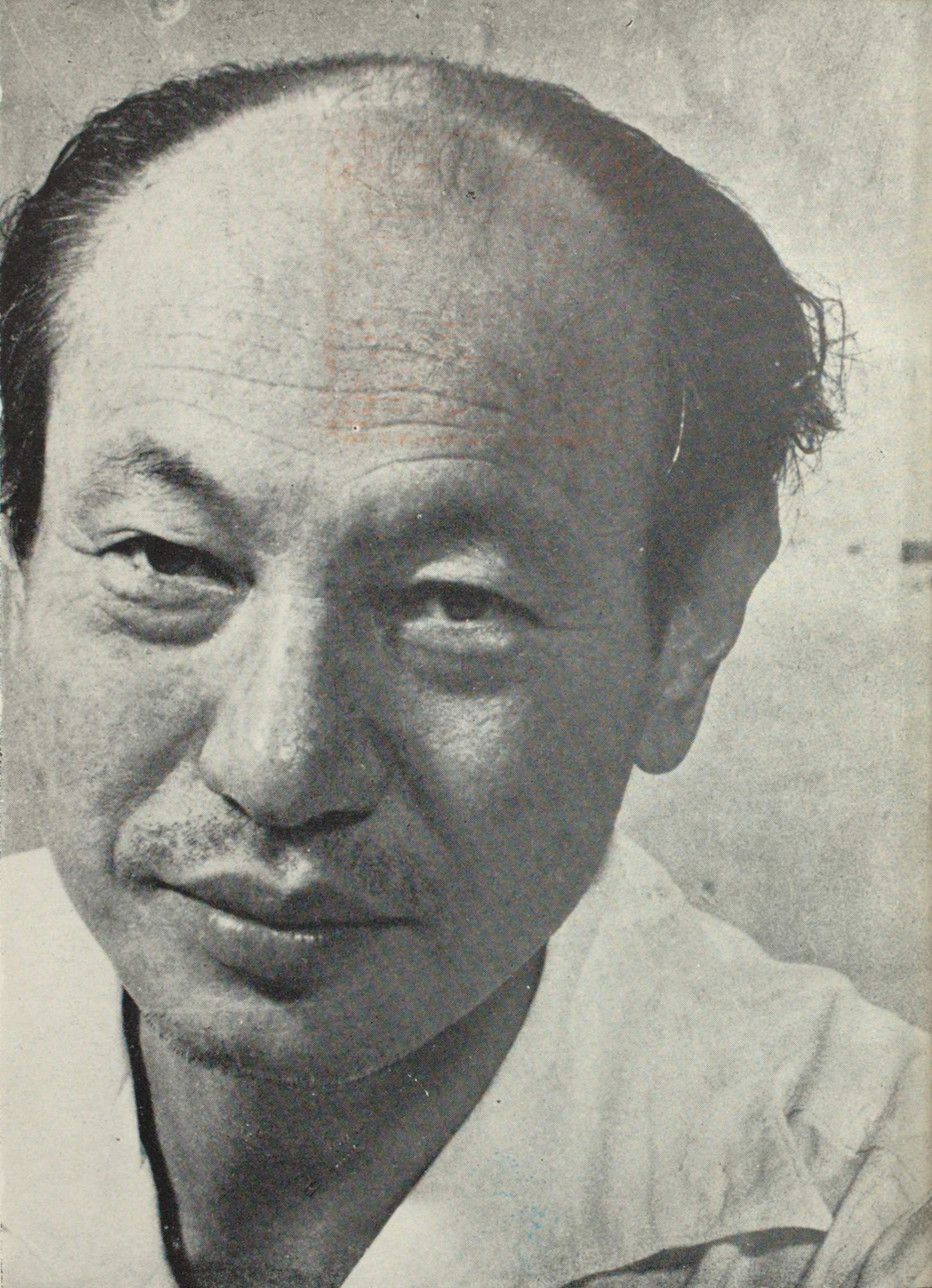
	First party	Second party	Third party
Leader	Ichirō Hatoyama	Chūji Machida	Tetsu Katayama
Party	Liberal	Progressive	Socialist
Seats won	141	94	93
Popular vote	13,505,746	10,350,530	9,924,930
Percentage	24.36%	18.67%	17.90%
	Fourth party	Fifth party
Leader	Yamamoto Sanehiko	Kyuichi Tokuda
Party	Cooperative	JCP
Seats won	14	5
Popular vote	1,799,764	2,135,757
Percentage	3.35%	3.85%
- Districts shaded according to winners' vote strength
Prime Minister before election
Kijūrō Shidehara
Independent
Elected Prime Minister
Shigeru Yoshida
Liberal

General elections were held in Japan on 10 April 1946, the first after World War II, during the Allied occupation. All 468 seats in the House of Representatives were elected by limited voting. The result was a victory for the Liberal Party, which won 141 of the 468 seats. Voter turnout was 72.1 percent.

== Background ==
Prime Minister Kijūrō Shidehara, who had been appointed by the Emperor Hirohito in October 1945, dissolved the House of Representatives in December 1945. Shidehara had been working with Allied occupation commander Douglas MacArthur to implement a new constitution and other political reforms.

In the months following the war, the Imperial Rule Assistance Association caucus broke up and three major political parties emerged in the Diet, loosely based around the major parties that stood in the 1937 election prior to the war. The Liberal Party was mainly composed of former Rikken Seiyūkai members, while the Progressive Party was mainly composed of former Rikken Minseitō members and the Socialist Party was mainly composed of former Shakai Taishūtō members.

This was the first time Japanese women were allowed to vote. 39 women were elected to office; this was the largest number of women deputies elected until 2005. On the other hand, Taiwanese and Koreans in Japan had their rights to vote and to run for office suspended inasmuch as their home territories had ceased to be part of Japan.

The electoral system use was a special type of Limited voting with district magnitude mostly ranging from 6 to 23, many parties (usually 4 to 7 or more) elected representatives in almost every district.

Following the election, there was a brief attempt to have Shidehara join the Progressive Party and remain in power, which the other major parties opposed. The Liberals and Progressives agreed to form a government under Liberal leader Ichiro Hatoyama on 2 May, but Hatoyama was promptly purged on 4 May and a new government formed under Foreign Minister Shigeru Yoshida, who officially became Prime Minister on 22 May.

== Results ==
Party	Votes	%	Seats
Liberal Party	13,505,746	24.36	141
Japan Progressive Party	10,350,530	18.67	94
Japan Socialist Party	9,924,930	17.90	93
Japanese Communist Party	2,135,757	3.85	5
Japan Cooperative Party	1,799,764	3.25	14
Other parties	6,488,032	11.70	38
Independents	11,244,120	20.28	81
Vacant			2
Total	55,448,879	100.00	468
Valid votes	26,100,175	98.19	
Invalid/blank votes	482,000	1.81	
Total votes	26,582,175	100.00	
Registered voters/turnout	36,878,417	72.08	
Source: Oscarsson, Nohlen et al.

=== By prefecture ===
Prefecture	Total seats	Seats won							
Prefecture	Total seats	Liberal	Progressive	Socialist	Communist	Cooperative	Others	Ind.	Vacant
Aichi	18	4	5	3			2	4	
Akita	8	1	1	3			2	1	
Aomori	7	2	3	1				1	
Chiba	13	6	2	1			1	3	
Ehime	9	2	4	2			1		
Fukui	5	1	1					2	1
Fukuoka	18	2	5	8				3	
Fukushima	13	4	7	2					
Gifu	10	5	2	1				2	
Gunma	10	1	5	3				1	
Hiroshima	12	3	1	3			2	3	
Hokkaido	23	6		4	1	7	3	2	
Hyōgo	18	5	7	4		1		1	
Ibaraki	13	4	5	1				3	
Ishikawa	6	3		1				2	
Iwate	8	4	2	2					
Kagawa	6	3		2				1	
Kagoshima	11	1	2	1		2	3	2	
Kanagawa	12	6		4			1	1	
Kōchi	5	2	1	2					
Kumamoto	10	4	2	1				3	
Kyoto	10	3	1	3				3	
Mie	9	1	4	1			1	2	
Miyagi	9	3	1	1			3	1	
Miyazaki	6						4	2	
Nagano	14	2	1	3	1	1	1	5	
Nagasaki	8	5	1	1				1	
Nara	5	1	1			1		2	
Niigata	15	5	5	4				1	
Ōita	7	2	2				2	1	
Okayama	10	3	2	2				3	
Okinawa	2								2
Osaka	18	3	4	5	1		3	2	
Saga	5	2	2					1	
Saitama	13	8	2	2			1		
Shiga	6	3		2				1	
Shimane	6	1	2	2				1	
Shizuoka	14	7		3		1	1	2	
Tochigi	10	2	4	2		1	1		
Tokushima	5							5	
Tokyo	22	7	1	9	2		2		1
Tottori	4	1	1					2	
Toyama	6	1	2				2	1	
Wakayama	6	3	1					2	
Yamagata	9	3	1	1			1	3	
Yamaguchi	9	4		1			1	3	
Yamanashi	5	1	1	2				1	
Total	468	140	94	92	5	14	38	81	4
