= Japan Progressive Party =

Japan Progressive Party 日本進歩党 Nihon Shinpotō
- Abbreviation: JPP
- President: Machida Chūji (first); Kijūrō Shidehara (second)
- Founder: Machida Chūji
- Founded: November 16, 1945
- Dissolved: March 31, 1947
- Preceded by: Imperial Rule Assistance Association
- Merged into: Democratic Party
- Ideology: Conservatism (Japanese); Ultraconservatism; Japanese nationalism Reactionism
- Political position: Right-wing

The Japan Progressive Party (Japanese: 日本進歩党, Hepburn: Nihon Shinpotō; JPP) was a right-wing conservative political party in Japan.

== History ==
The JPP was established on 16 November 1945. When the JPP was formed, it absorbed most of the Greater Japan Political Association (Dainihon Seijikai). This organization was formed during World War II and evolved from the Political Association to Assist the Imperial Rule (Yokusan Seijikai). The majority of members of the JPP were formerly members of the Imperial Rule Assistance Association, and going back even further, they were former members of the Constitutional Democratic Party (Rikken Minseitō) and the Rikken Seiyūkai. At the time of its founding, the party held 273 seats in the House of Representatives, consisting of 89 members from the Minseitō and 46 members from the Seiyūkai. Prior to the first general election after the war (April 1946), a large-scale purge of pre-war political leaders was carried out based on a directive from the General Headquarters of the Supreme Commander for the Allied Powers. The directive was communicated to the Japanese government on 4 January 1946. Because many of its members had been involved with the pre-war militaristic regime, the party was most affected when ultranationalists were purged from public office. Those targeted for the purge included Machida Chūji, a main founder and first president of the party, as well as Kenzō Matsumura, Toshio Shimada and Chikuhei Nakajima. In addition to 238 MPs and all but one its central committee members barred from politics.

The first general election under the new constitution was held on 10 April 1946, in which the JPP won 94 seats. The Japan Liberal Party (JLP), led by Ichirō Hatoyama, became the largest party, while the JPP became the second largest. This defeat in the election meant that the JPP relinquished leadership within the conservative camp to the JLP. On April 23, 1946, the day after the Shidehara Cabinet resigned en masse, Kijūrō Shidehara accepted the position of president of the JPP. On 22 May 1946, the Yoshida Cabinet was formed as a coalition government consisting of ministers from the JPP and the JLP.

From mid-1946 to early 1947, the JPP was shaken by a conflict between conservatives and younger leaders. Hitoshi Ashida of the JLP aimed to establish a three-party coalition government including the Japan Socialist Party, however within the JPP, a conflict arose between Shidehara, who sought a cabinet reshuffle, and the reformists led by Takeru Inukai and others. These internal party conflicts and purges from public office led to a decline in the JPP's influence, and the party was dissolved on 31 March 1947. Shidehara envisioned a merger between the JPP and the JLP in anticipation of the upcoming general election, however the JLP itself showed little interest in the plan. Talks later in 1946 with the Cooperative Democratic Party about a merger failed, as did efforts in February 1947 to negotiate a merger with the JLP, although a few JLP MPs led by Hitoshi Ashida subsequently joined the JPP, together with a group from the National Cooperative Party. At the end of March the decision was taken to dissolved the JPP and form the Democratic Party.

== Ideology and policies ==
The Japan Progressive Party was variously described as right-wing, conservative, ultra-conservative, nationalist, and reactionary.

Despite having the word "progressive" in its name, the JPP was actually a conservative party, and was also described as a ultra-conservative. The JPP was one of the major conservative parties, alongside the Japan Liberal Party (JLP). While there were no ideological differences between the two parties, the JPP was a more nationalistic party than the JLP. The General Headquarters of the Supreme Commander for the Allied Powers viewed the JPP as a party representing reactionary political views and was concerned about the possibility of it gaining a majority in the House of Representatives. The JPP adopted the preservation of kokutai as its platform, and its president Kijūrō Shidehara advocated anti-communism and the preservation of kokutai and Emperor system. The JPP's platform asserted that the Emperor and the Japanese people are "one," that the imperial institution should maintain sovereignty, and that this system continues to embody the "unchanging kokutai."

The JPP supported constitutional monarchy to uphold democratic procedures and human rights, and rejected "irresponsible and radical ideologies." The JPP demanded constitutional reform, radical reform of the political structure, democratic judicial reform, and decentralization of the bureaucracy. According to political scientist Sigal Ben-Rafael Galanti, the JPP, which aimed to build a model that fused monarchy with a thoroughly democratic style, can be described as being composed of extreme nationalists and more moderate right-wing forces with democratic and pro-Western views. The reason why politicians in the JPP, despite having once belonged to the Imperial Rule Assistance Association, were able to assert their loyalty to parliamentary democracy is that they were completely ignored in the government's decision-making process during the war.

The JPP's socio-economic policies were close to moderate socialism. The party called for a daily ration of three gō (cups) of rice per person, as well as government support for housing, clothing, and education. In the long term, the aim was to achieve equality based on fair distribution and to promote cooperative organizations in the industrial, agricultural, and labor sectors. The JPP also advocated national policies that would promote small and medium-sized enterprises while curbing the formation of cartels by the zaibatsu. Furthermore, they demanded the implementation of large-scale national projects such as the development of roads, dams, and rivers, as well as the opening up of land to encourage farmers to settle down.

The JPP avoided clearly outlining a specific peace strategy and did not express clear support for neutrality or disarmament.

== Election results ==
=== House of Representatives ===
Election	Leader	Votes	%	Seats	Position	Status
1946	Machida Chūji	10,350,530	18.67	94 / 468	2nd	Governing coalition
