= Kijūrō Shidehara =

Prime Minister of Japan from 1945 to 1946

Baron Kijūrō Shidehara
- 幣原 喜重郎
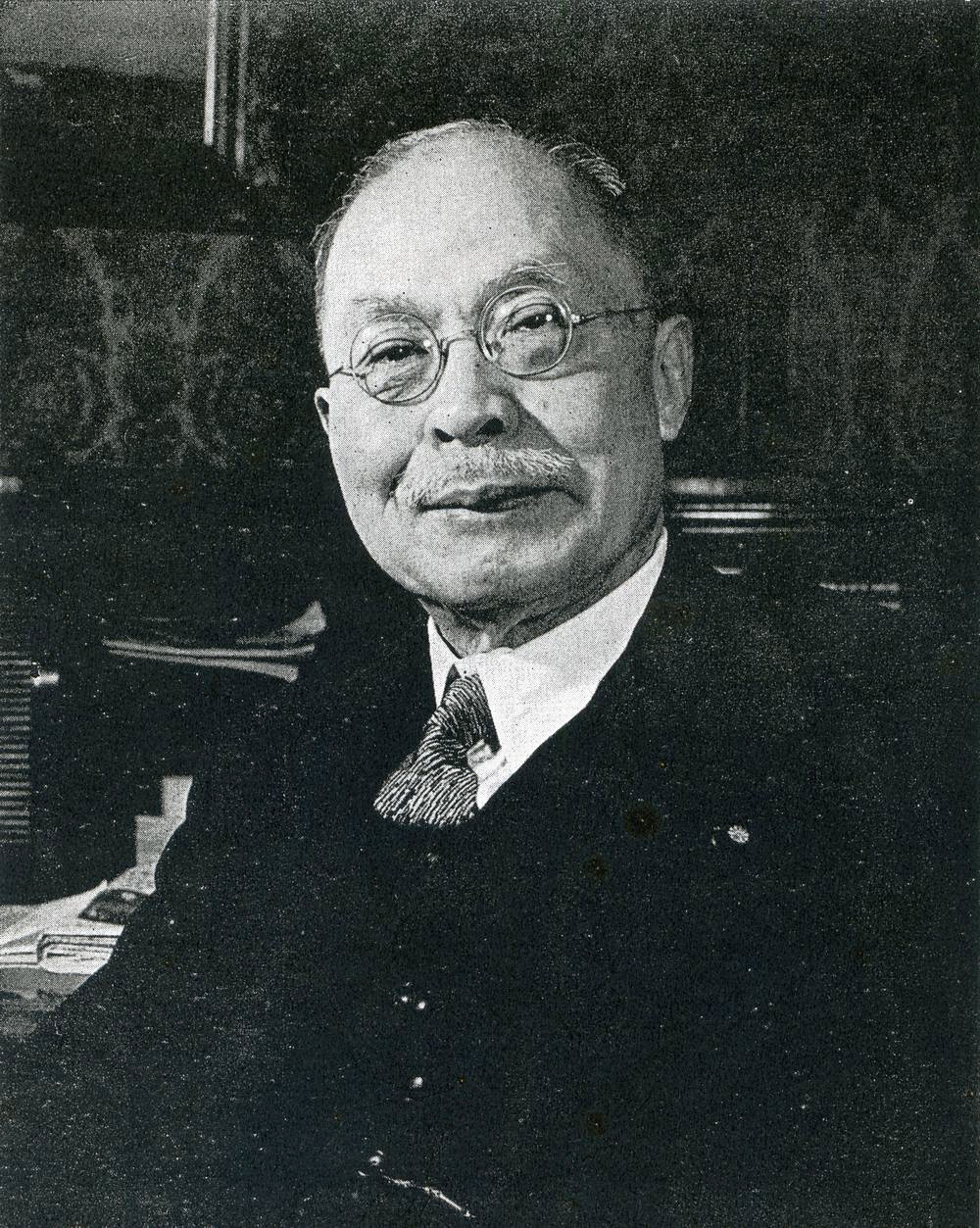

Prime Minister of Japan
- In office 9 October 1945 – 22 May 1946
- Monarch: Hirohito
- Governor: Douglas MacArthur
- Preceded by: Naruhiko Higashikuni
- Succeeded by: Shigeru Yoshida

Acting Prime Minister of Japan
- In office 14 November 1930 – 10 March 1931
- Monarch: Hirohito
- Preceded by: Hamaguchi Osachi
- Succeeded by: Hamaguchi Osachi

Speaker of the House of Representatives
- In office 11 February 1949 – 10 March 1951
- Monarch: Hirohito
- Deputy: Nobuyuki Iwamoto
- Preceded by: Komakichi Matsuoka
- Succeeded by: Jōji Hayashi

Deputy Prime Minister of Japan
- In office 3 May 1947 – 24 May 1947
- Prime Minister: Shigeru Yoshida
- Preceded by: Office established
- Succeeded by: Hitoshi Ashida
Ministerial offices
Director-General of the Demobilization Agency
In office 15 June 1946 – 24 May 1947
Prime Minister	Shigeru Yoshida
Preceded by	Office established
Succeeded by	Junzō Sasamori
Minister for Foreign Affairs
In office 2 July 1929 – 13 December 1931
Prime Minister	Hamaguchi Osachi; Wakatsuki Reijirō
Preceded by	Tanaka Giichi
Succeeded by	Inukai Tsuyoshi
In office 11 June 1924 – 20 April 1927
Prime Minister	Katō Takaaki; Wakatsuki Reijirō
Preceded by	Matsui Keishirō
Succeeded by	Tanaka Giichi
Party political offices
Leader of the Dōshi Club
In office 28 November 1947 – 12 March 1948
Preceded by	Position established
Succeeded by	Position abolished
President of the Japan Progressive Party
In office 23 April 1946 – 31 March 1947
Preceded by	Machida Chūji
Succeeded by	Position abolished

Member of the House of Representatives
- In office 26 April 1947 – 10 March 1951
- Preceded by: Constituency established
- Constituency: Osaka 3rd

Member of the House of Peers
- In office 29 January 1926 – 25 April 1947 Nominated by the Emperor

Personal details
- Born: 13 September 1872 Sakai, Nara, Empire of Japan (now Kadoma, Osaka, Japan)
- Died: 10 March 1951 (aged 78) Setagaya, Tokyo, Allied-occupied Japan
- Party: Independent (before 1945; after 1950)
- Other political affiliations: Progressive (1945–1947); Democratic (1947); Dōshi Club (1947–1948); DLP (1948–1950)
- Spouse: Masako Shidehara (m. 1903)
- Relatives: Iwasaki Yatarō (father-in-law); Katō Takaaki (brother-in-law); Kiuchi Jūshirō (brother-in-law)
- Education: Tokyo Imperial University
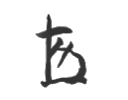
- Signature

Baron Kijūrō Shidehara (幣原 喜重郎, Shidehara Kijūrō; 13 September 1872 – 10 March 1951), was a Japanese diplomat and politician who served as Prime Minister of Japan from 1945 to 1946. He was a leading proponent of pacifism in Japan before and after World War II.

Born to a wealthy Osaka family, Shidehara studied law at Tokyo Imperial University and graduated in 1895. He then joined the foreign service and held postings in Korea, Europe, and the United States, serving as ambassador to the latter from 1919 to 1922. Shidehara served as foreign minister from 1924 to 1927 and from 1929 to 1931, and favored a non-interventionist policy in China. As prime minister after World War II, Shidehara set into motion many of the occupation reforms. After his tenure, he served as the president of the Progressive Party and as an adviser to Shigeru Yoshida. He was elected to the National Diet in 1947 and joined the Liberal Party, and from 1949 to 1951 served as speaker of the House of Representatives.

== Early life and career ==
Shidehara was born on 13 September 1872, in Kadoma, Osaka, into a wealthy farming family (gōnō). His brother Taira was the first president of Taihoku Imperial University. Shidehara attended Tokyo Imperial University, and graduated from the Faculty of Law, where he had studied under Hozumi Nobushige. After graduation, he found a position within the Foreign Ministry and was sent as a consul to Chemulpo in Korea in 1896.

In 1903, Shidehara married Masako Iwasaki, who came from the family that founded the Mitsubishi zaibatsu. This made him the brother-in-law of Katō Takaaki, who had also been prime minister.

He subsequently served in the Japanese embassy in London, Antwerp, and Washington D.C., and as ambassador to the Netherlands, returning to Japan in 1915.

In 1915, Shidehara was appointed Vice Minister of Foreign Affairs and continued in this position during five consecutive administrations. In 1919, he was named ambassador to the United States and was Japan's leading negotiator during the Washington Naval Conference. His negotiations led to the return of Jiaozhou Bay concession to China. However, while he was ambassador, the United States enacted discriminatory immigration laws against Japanese, which created much ill will in Japan.

Shidehara was elevated to the title of danshaku (baron) under the kazoku peerage system in 1920, and appointed to a seat in the House of Peers in 1925.

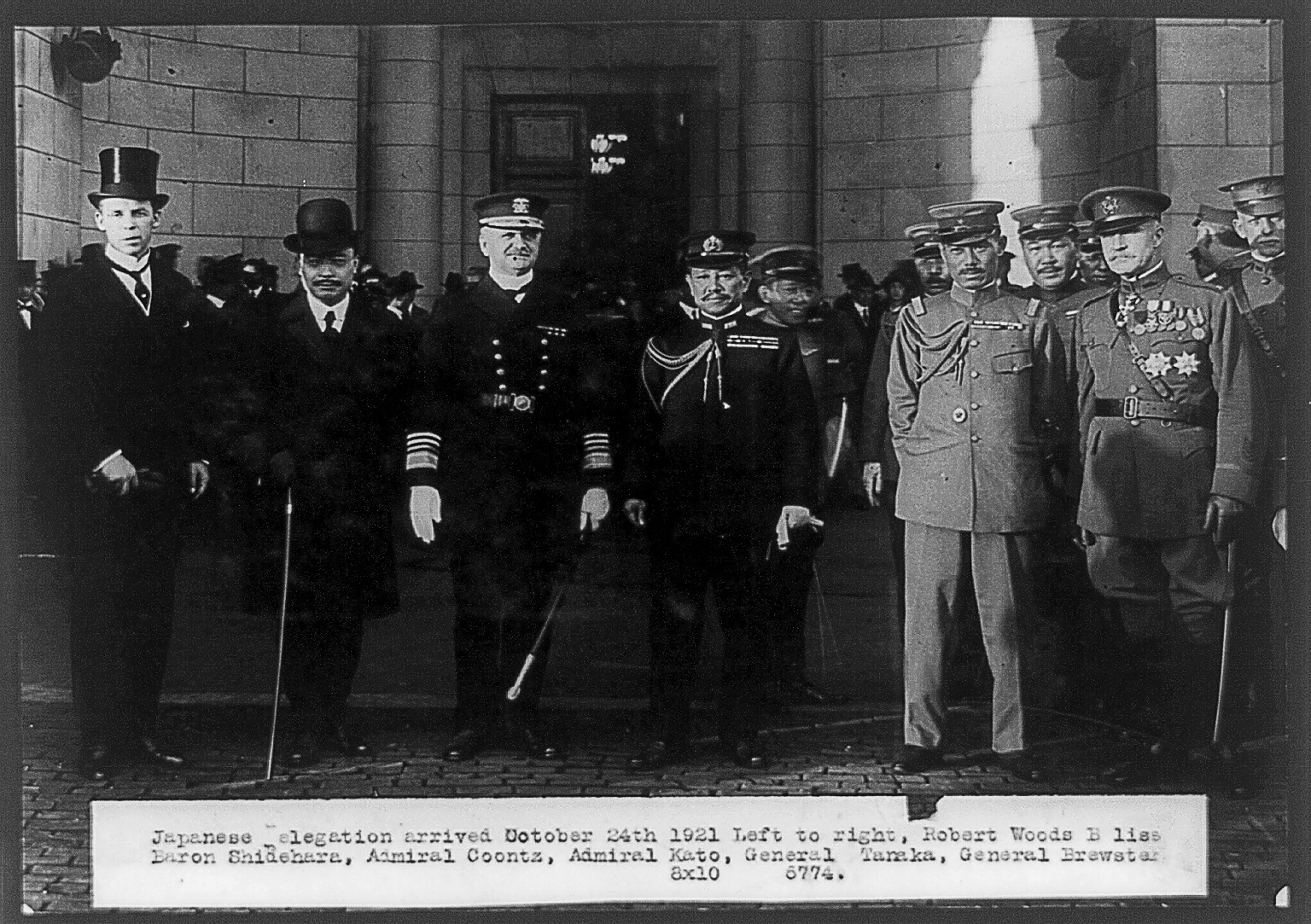
From left to right: Robert Woods Bliss, Robert Coontz, Kanji Kato, Kunishige Tanaka, Andre Brewster at the Washington Conference on 24 October 1921.

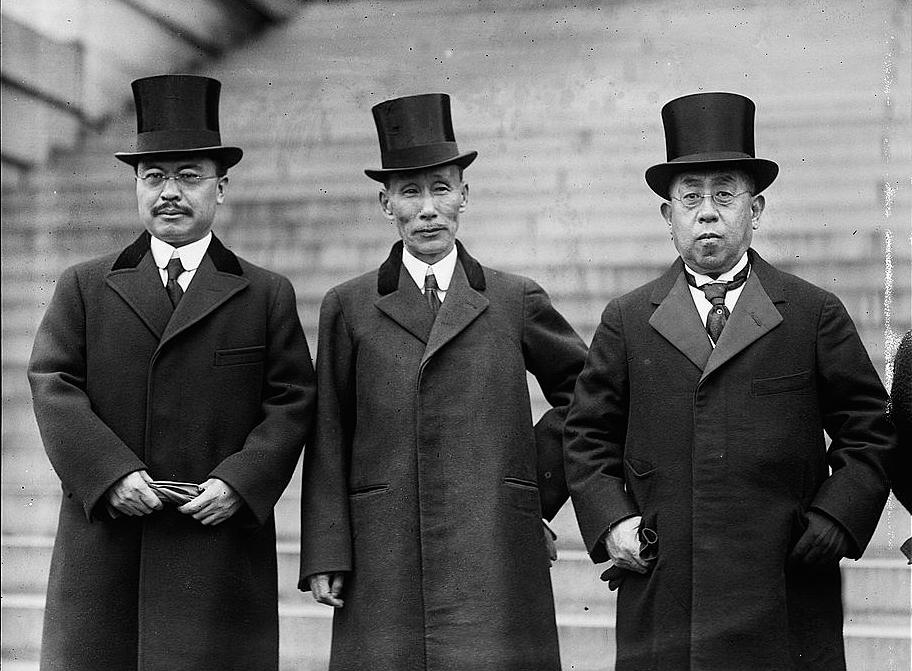
Left to right; Baron Kijuro Shidehara, Admiral Katō Tomosaburō, Prince Iesato Tokugawa on 3 November 1921, to attend the Washington Naval Conference.

== First term as foreign minister ==
In 1924, Shidehara became minister of foreign affairs in the cabinet of Prime Minister Katō Takaaki and continued in this post under prime ministers Wakatsuki Reijirō and Osachi Hamaguchi. Despite growing Japanese militarism, Shidehara attempted to maintain a non-interventionist policy toward China, and good relations with Great Britain and the United States, which he admired. In his initial speech to the Diet of Japan, he pledged to uphold the principles of the League of Nations.

The term "Shidehara diplomacy" came to describe Japan's liberal foreign policy during the 1920s. In October 1925, he surprised other delegates to the Beijing Customs Conference in pushing for agreement to China's demands for tariff autonomy. In March 1927, during the Nanking Incident, he refused to agree to an ultimatum prepared by other foreign powers threatening retaliation for the actions of Chiang Kai-shek's Kuomintang troops for their attacks on foreign consulates and settlements.

Disgruntlement by the military over Shidehara's China policies was one of the factors that led to the collapse of the administration of Prime Minister Wakatsuki in April 1927. During his diplomatic career, Shidehara was known for his excellent command of the English language. At one press conference, an American reporter was confused regarding the pronunciation of Shidehara's name: the foreign minister replied, "I'm Hi(he)-dehara, and my wife is Shi(she)-dehara." Because his wife was a Quaker, Shidehara was rumoured to be one too.

== Second term as foreign minister ==
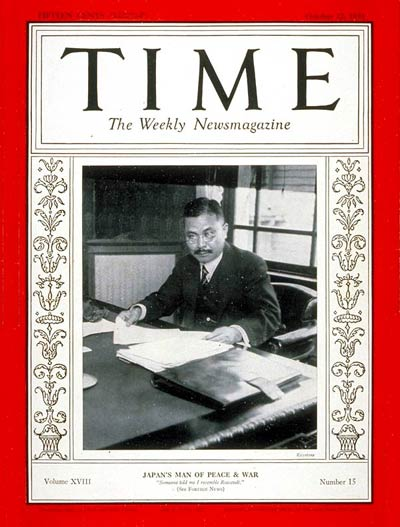
Shidehara on the cover of the 12 October 1931 issue of Time magazine

Shidehara returned as foreign minister in 1929, and immediately resumed the non-interventionist policy in China, attempting to restore good relations with Chiang Kai-shek's government now based in Nanjing. This policy was assailed by military interests who believed it was weakening the country, especially after the conclusion of the London Naval Conference 1930, which precipitated a major political crisis.

When Prime Minister Hamaguchi Osachi was seriously wounded in an assassination attempt, Shidehara served as interim prime minister until March 1931. In September 1931, the Kwantung Army invaded and occupied Manchuria in the Manchurian Incident without prior authorization from the central government. This effectively ended the non-interventionist policy towards China, and Shidehara's career as foreign minister.

In October 1931, Shidehara was featured on the cover of Time with the caption "Japan's Man of Peace and War".

Shidehara remained in government as a member of the House of Peers from 1931 to 1945. He maintained a low profile through the end of World War II.

== Premiership (1945–1946) ==
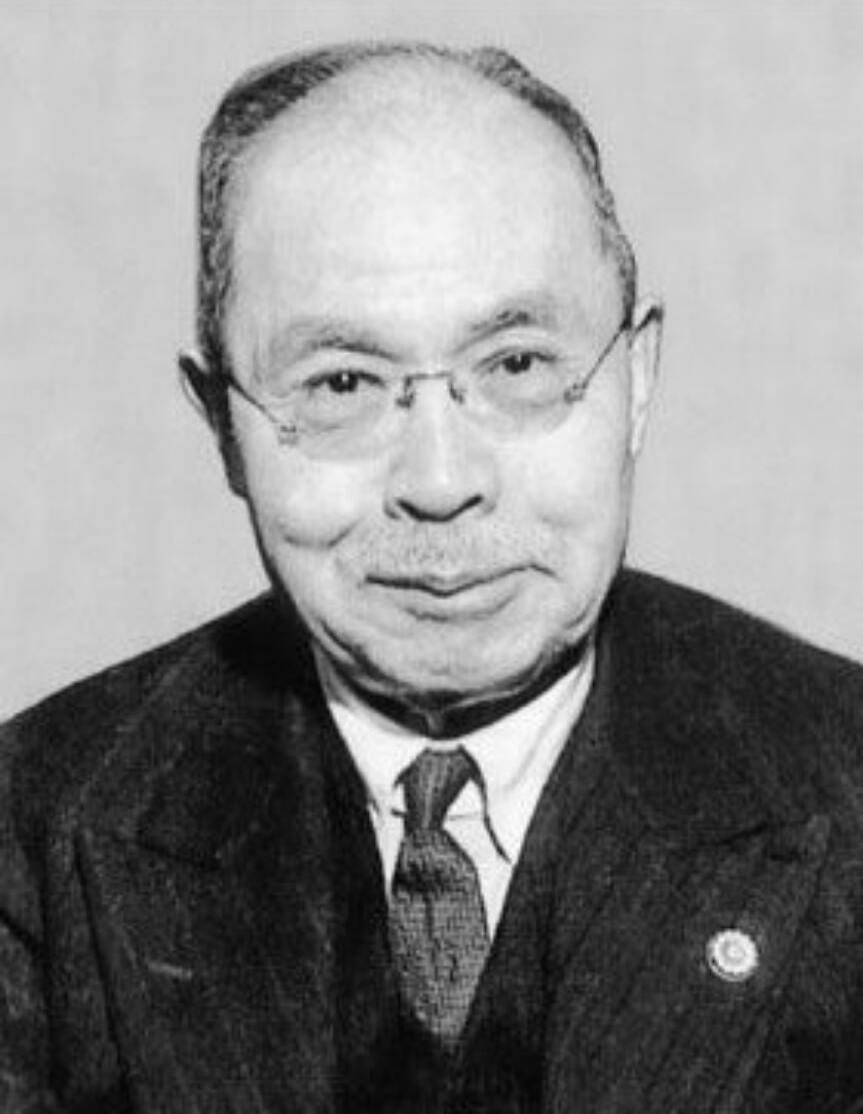
- Premiership of Kijūrō Shidehara; 9 October 1945 – 22 May 1946
- Monarch: Emperor Shōwa
- Cabinet: Shidehara Cabinet
- Party: Independent; (Allied occupation)
- Seat: Naikaku Sōri Daijin Kantei
- Emblem of the Government of Japan

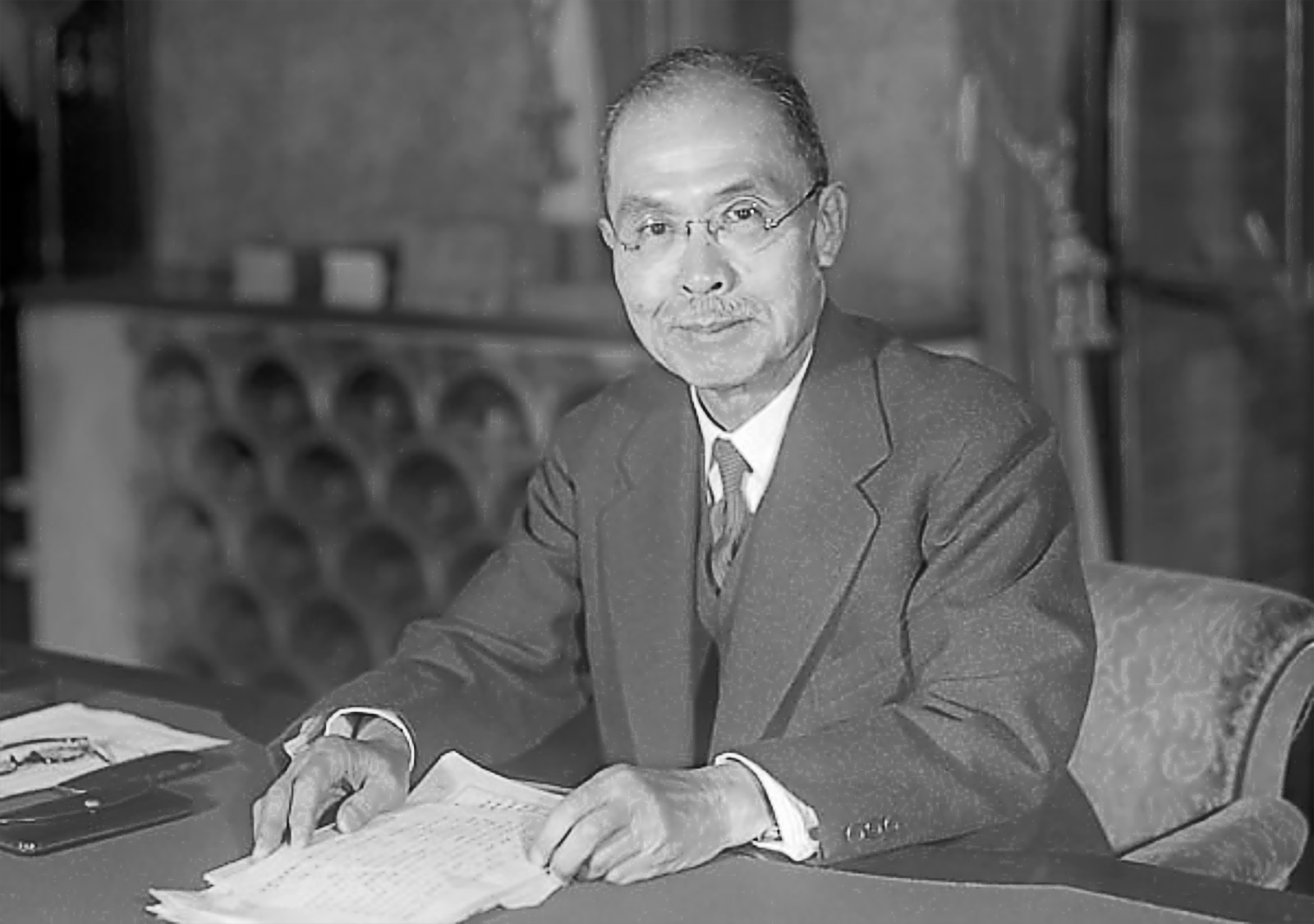
Kijūrō Shidehara

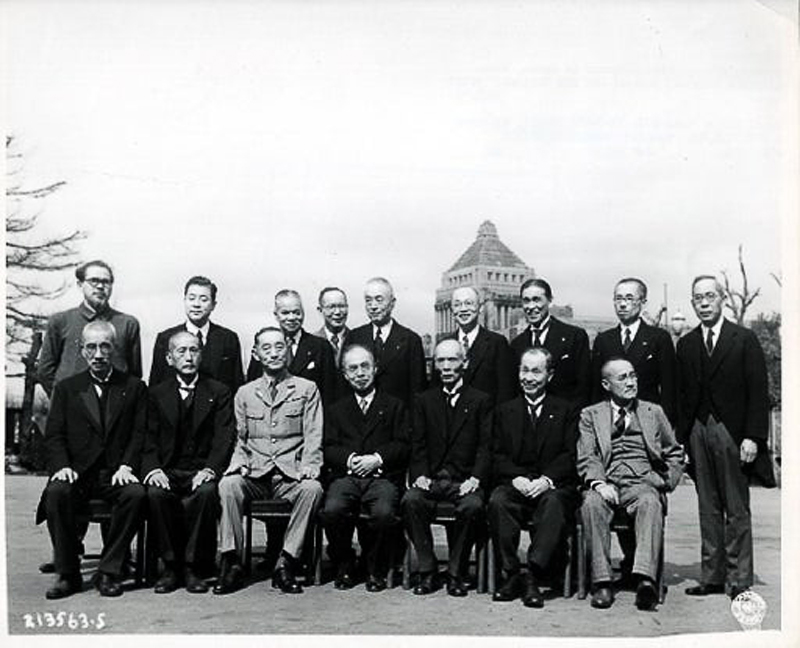
9 October 1945, with ministers of the Shidehara Cabinet

At the time of Japan's surrender in 1945, Shidehara was in semi-retirement. However, largely because of his pro-American reputation, he was appointed to serve as Japan's first post-war prime minister, from 9 October 1945 to 22 May 1946. Along with the post of prime minister, Shidehara became president of the Progressive Party (Shinpo-tō).

Shidehara's cabinet appointed a non-official committee to look into the question of drafting a new constitution for Japan in line with General Douglas MacArthur's policy directives, but the draft was vetoed by the occupation authorities. According to MacArthur and others, it was Shidehara who originally proposed the inclusion of Article 9 of the Constitution of Japan, a provision which limits Japan's ability to wage war. Shidehara, in his memoirs Gaikō gojūnen ("Fifty-years Diplomacy", 1951) also admitted to his authorship, and described how the idea came to him on a train ride to Tokyo. Already when he was ambassador in Washington, he had become acquainted with the idea of 'outlawing war' in international and constitutional law. One of his famous sayings was: "Let us create a world without war (sensō naki sekai) together with the world-humanity (sekai jinrui).”

However, his supposed conservative economic policies and family ties to the Mitsubishi interests made him unpopular with the leftist movement.

The Shidehara cabinet resigned following Japan's first postwar election, when the Liberal Party of Japan captured most of the votes. Shigeru Yoshida became prime minister in Shidehara's wake.

Shidehara joined the Liberal Party a year later, after Prime Minister Tetsu Katayama formed a socialist government. As one of Katayama's harshest critics, Shidehara was elected speaker of the House of Representatives. He died in this post in 1951.

== Honours ==
From the Japanese Wikipedia article

=== Peerages ===
- Baron (7 September 1920)

=== Japanese ===
- Grand Cordon of the Order of the Sacred Treasure (19 August 1914; Second Class: 24 August 1911)
- Grand Cordon of the Order of the Rising Sun (7 September 1920)
- Grand Cordon of the Order of the Rising Sun with Paulownia Flowers (12 December 1931)

=== Foreign ===
- Grand Officer of the Order of Saints Maurice and Lazarus (Kingdom of Italy; 18 June 1914)
- Knight Grand Cross of the Order of Orange-Nassau (Netherlands; 12 November 1915)
- Order of the British Empire (United Kingdom; 3 July 1917)
- Grand Cordon of the Order of Leopold (Belgium; 11 July 1925)
- Grand Cross of the Order of the Sun (Peru; 24 August 1926)
- Grand Cross of the Legion of Honour (France; 1 April 1927)
- Grand Cross of the Order of the White Lion (Czechoslovakia; 7 February 1928)
- Grand Cross of the Order of the White Elephant (Siam; 26 September 1931)
- Grand Cross of the Order of Menelik II (Ethiopia; 24 December 1931)
- Grand Cross of the Order of Merit for National Foundation (Manchukuo; 1 March 1934)

=== Court order of precedence ===
- Sixth rank (10 October 1903)
- Senior sixth rank (27 December 1905)
- Fifth rank (30 March 1908)
- Senior fifth rank (20 September 1911)
- Fourth rank (10 December 1915)
- Third rank (10 November 1922)
- Senior third rank (1 December 1925)
- Second rank (16 February 1931)
- First rank (10 March 1951; posthumous)

== Notes ==
Political offices
Preceded by Matsui Keishirō	Minister for Foreign Affairs; 1924–1927	Succeeded by Tanaka Giichi
Preceded by Naruhiko Higashikuni	Prime Minister of Japan; 1945–1946	Succeeded by Shigeru Yoshida
New title	Deputy Prime Minister of Japan; 1947	Succeeded by Hitoshi Ashida
Diplomatic posts
Preceded by Ishii Kikujirō	Japanese Ambassador to the United States; 1919–1922	Succeeded by Masanao Hanihara
