= Toshio Irie (civil servant) =

Japanese bureaucrat and politician

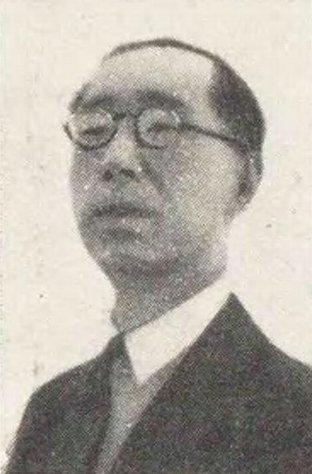
Toshio Irie

Toshio Irie (入江 俊郎, Irie Toshio, January 10, 1901 – July 18, 1972) was a Japanese bureaucrat and politician.

Born and raised in Tokyo, Toshio attended Tokyo University and joined the Home Affairs Ministry on graduation. He became Counselor for the Bureau of Legislation in 1927, and served in various posts there.

In 1946, under Yoshida Shigeru Toshio was promoted to Director-General of the Bureau. In this role, he assisted in drafting the reforms to the post-war Constitution of Japan, and served on the Cabinet's committee for dealing with legislative problems. After the enactment of the new constitution, Toshio was appointed to the House of Peers, and two years later he was promoted to Commissioner General of the House of Representatives' Legislative Bureau. He later served as a Justice of the Supreme Court of Japan from 1952 to 1970, the longest recorded tenure in that office.

After his retirement from public office in 1971, Toshio became a lecturer at Komazawa University. He died the following year.
