= Dōshi Club (1947–48) =

Dōshi Club 同志クラブ
- Leader: Kijūrō Shidehara
- Founded: 28 November 1947
- Dissolved: 12 March 1948
- Split from: Democratic Party
- Merged into: Democratic Liberal Party
- Headquarters: Tokyo, Japan
- Ideology: Conservatism

The Dōshi Club (Japanese: 同志クラブ, lit. Fellow Thinkers Club) was a political party in Japan.

== History ==
The party was established by Kijūrō Shidehara on 28 November 1947 as a breakaway from the Democratic Party. Its 22 MPs were opposed to the government's coal nationalisation law being pushed by Tetsu Katayama's government, which the DP was willing to make concessions over.

In March 1948 it merged with the Liberal Party and another faction from the Democratic Party to form the Democratic Liberal Party.
