= Liberal Party (Japan, 1945) =

Japan Liberal Party 日本自由党
- President: Ichirō Hatoyama (first); Shigeru Yoshida (second)
- Founded: 9 November 1945
- Dissolved: 15 March 1948
- Merger of: Dōkōkai
- Merged into: Democratic Liberal Party
- Headquarters: Tokyo, Japan
- Ideology: Kokutai; Conservatism; Antimilitarism; Economic liberalism

The Japan Liberal Party (日本自由党, Nihon Jiyūtō) was a political party in Japan.

== History ==
The Japan Liberal Party was founded on November 9, 1945, mainly by former members of Seiyukai Party, with Ichirō Hatoyama being its first leader. From 1946-1954 the next party leader Shigeru Yoshida served as Prime Minister.

In 1948 the Japan Liberal Party merged with Kijūrō Shidehara's Dōshi Club, and a faction of the Democratic Party led by Saitō Takao, to form the Democratic Liberal Party.

== Leaders ==
No.	Name	Portrait	Term of office	
No.	Name	Portrait	Took office	Left office
1	Ichirō Hatoyama		9 November 1945	18 August 1946
2	Shigeru Yoshida		18 August 1946	15 March 1948

== Election results ==
=== House of Representatives ===
Election	Leader	Votes	%	Seats	+/-	Position	Status
1946	Ichirō Hatoyama	13,505,746	24.36	141 / 468	new	1st	Government
1947	Shigeru Yoshida	7,312,524	26.73	131 / 468	▼9	2nd	Opposition

=== House of Councillors ===
Election	Leader	Constituency			Party list			Seats	Position	Status
Election	Leader	Votes	%	Seats	Votes	%	Seats	Seats	Position	Status
1947	Ichirō Hatoyama	3,769,704	17.10	30 / 150	1,360,456	6.40	8 / 100	38 / 250	2nd	Governing coalition
