= Democratic Liberal Party (Japan) =

Democratic Liberal Party 民主自由党 Minshu-jiyūtō
- Leader: Shigeru Yoshida
- Founded: 15 March 1948
- Dissolved: 1 March 1950
- Merger of: Liberal Party; Minshu Club
- Merged into: Liberal Party
- Headquarters: Tokyo
- Ideology: Conservatism

The Democratic Liberal Party (民主自由党, Minshu-jiyūtō) was a political party in Japan.

== History ==
The party was established in March 1948 as a merger of the Liberal Party, Dōshi Club and a faction of the Democratic Party led by Saitō Takao. United by their opposition to the coal nationalisation law, the new party had 152 MPs and 46 members of the House of Councillors.

As a result of the DLP's attempts to block Yamazaki Takeshi from forming a new government after Hitoshi Ashida resigned as prime minister, the party's Shigeru Yoshida became prime minister in October 1948 and early elections were called in January 1949. The DLP won a landslide victory, taking 269 of the 466 seats, the first time a party had held a majority of seats since World War II. Shigeru Yoshida continued as prime minister.

In March 1950 the party merged with the Alliance faction of the Democratic Party to form the new Liberal Party.

== Leader ==
#	Name	Portrait	From	To
1	Shigeru Yoshida		15 March 1948	1 March 1950

== Election results ==
=== House of Representatives ===
Election	Leader	Votes	%	Seats	Position	Status
1949	Shigeru Yoshida	13,420,269	43.87	264 / 466	1st	Government
