= Cabinet Legislation Bureau =

Government agency that advises the Japanese Cabinet

Coordinates: 35°40′24″N 139°44′53″E

- 内閣法制局; Naikaku-hōseikyoku

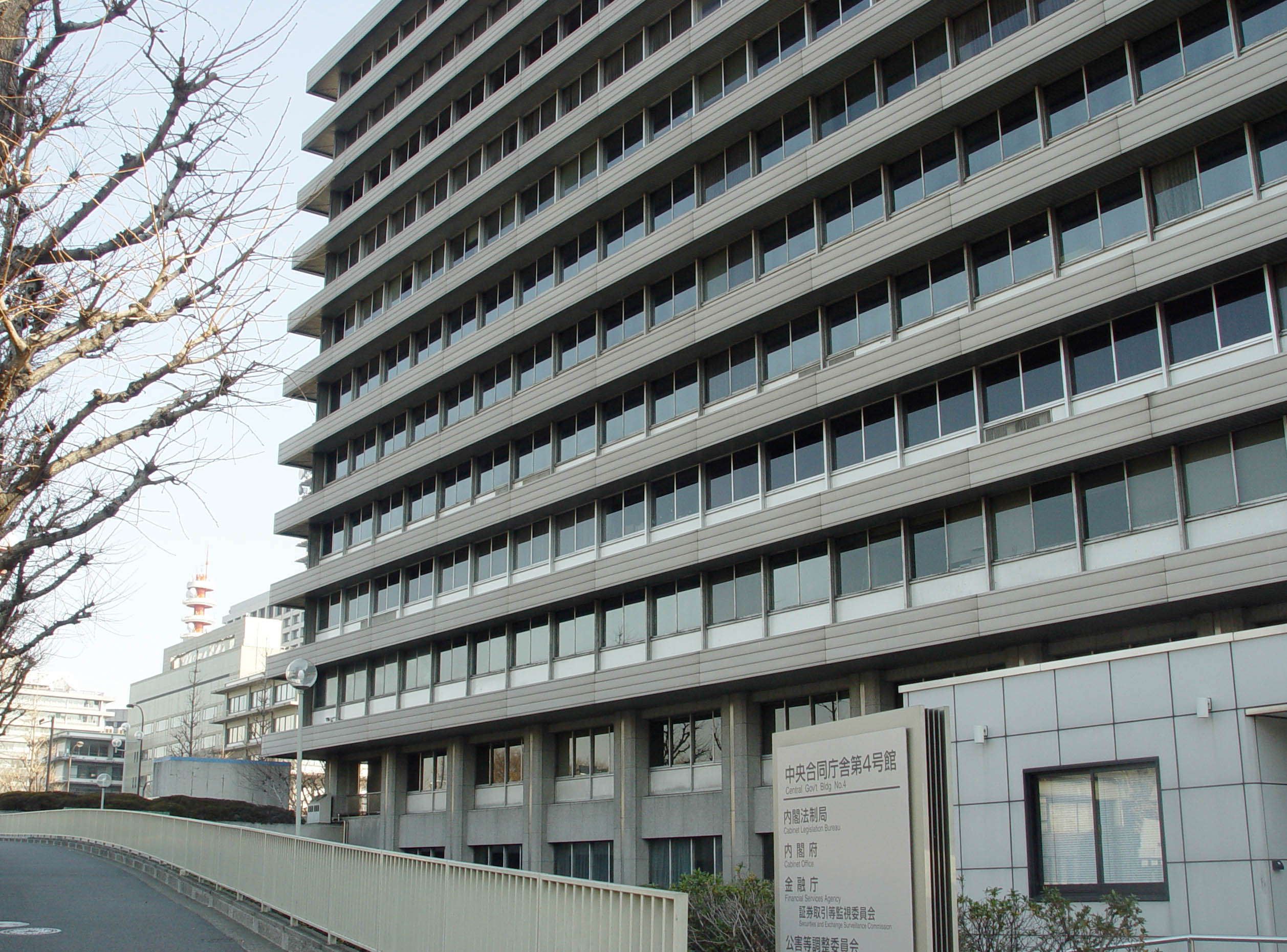
- Central Government Building No. 4, where the Cabinet Legislation Bureau is located

Agency overview
- Formed: July 1, 1962
- Preceding agency: Legislation Bureau
- Jurisdiction: Japan
- Headquarters: 3-1-1 Kasumigaseki Chiyoda-ku, Tokyo 100-0013, Japan
- Employees: 77
- Annual budget: \1,195,829,000 (2021)
- Agency executives: Nobuyuki Iwao, Director-General of the Cabinet Legislation Bureau; Yoichi Kimura, Deputy Director-General of the Cabinet Legislation Bureau
- Parent agency: Cabinet of Japan
- Website: www.clb.go.jp/english/ (in English)

The Cabinet Legislation Bureau (内閣法制局, naikakuhōseikyoku) is a Japanese government agency which advises Cabinet members on drafting legislation to be proposed to the Diet. It acts as legal counsel for the Cabinet by examining bills, orders, and treaties. It also presents opinions on legal matters to the Prime Minister and other Cabinet Ministers.

== Bureau departments ==
In support of its opinion-giving and examination roles, the Bureau is divided into four departments:

=== First Department ===
The First Department does opinion-giving work. It gives opinions. It interprets existing laws and pending legislation for the Executive Branch. Of course, the actual interpretation of the law is performed by the courts. The Constitutional Archives Research Office is also located in the First Department.

=== Second Department ===
The Second Department does examination work. It examines pending legislative bills, draft Cabinet orders, and draft treaties that relate to the Cabinet; the Ministry of Justice; the Ministry of Education, Culture, Sports, Science and Technology; the Ministry of Land, Infrastructure, Transport and Tourism; and the Ministry of Defense.

=== Third Department ===
The Third Department does examination work. It examines pending legislative bills, draft Cabinet orders, and draft treaties that relate to the Financial Services Agency; the Ministry of Internal Affairs and Communications; the Ministry of Foreign Affairs; the Ministry of Finance; and the Board of Audit.

=== Fourth Department ===
The Fourth Department does examination work. It examines pending legislative bills, draft Cabinet orders, and draft treaties that relate to the Fair Trade Commission; the Environmental Disputes Coordination Commission; the Ministry of Health, Labour and Welfare; the Ministry of Agriculture, Forestry and Fisheries; the Ministry of Economy, Trade and Industry; and the Ministry of the Environment.
