= List of political parties in Japan =

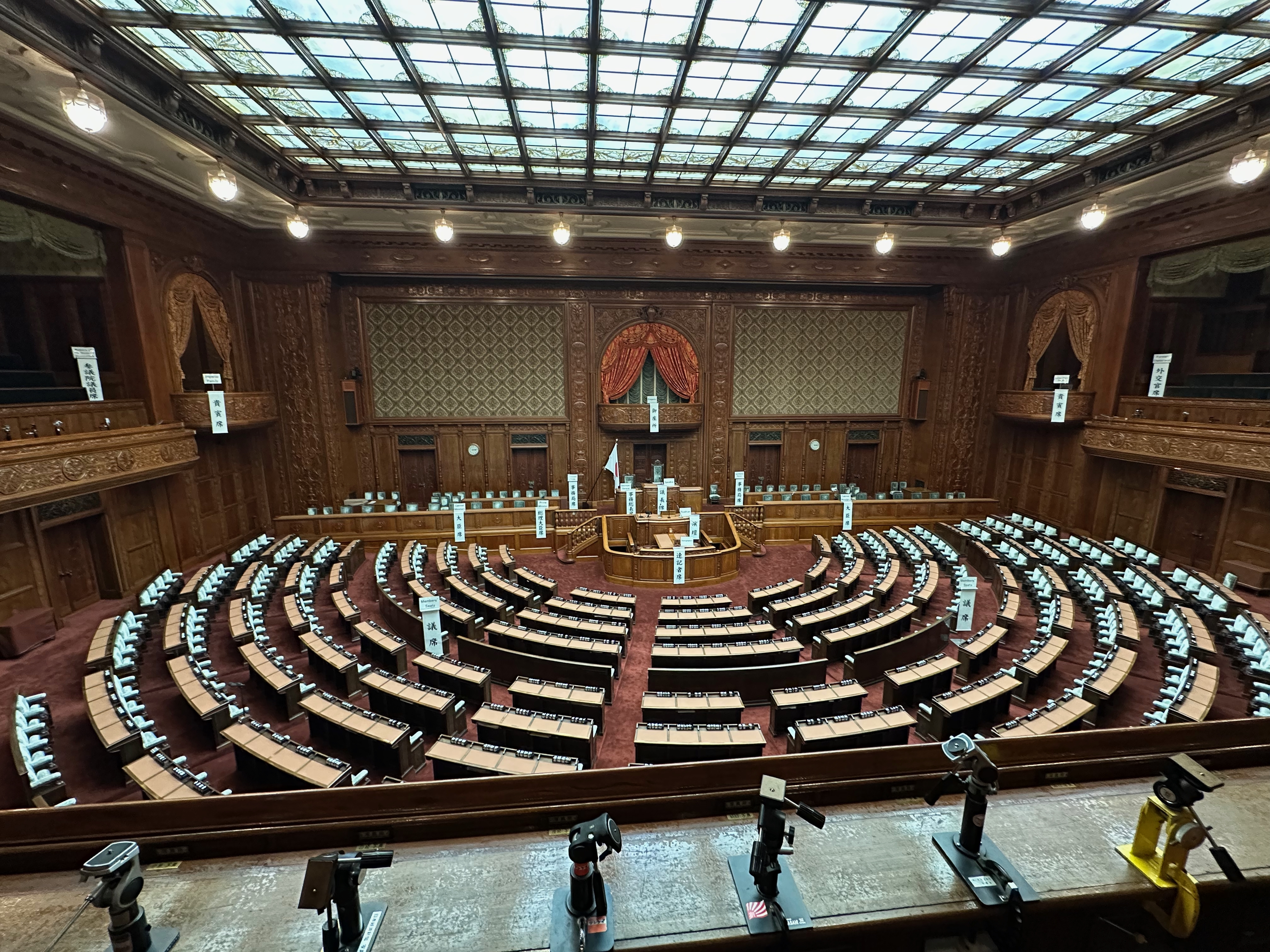
Chamber of the House of Representatives

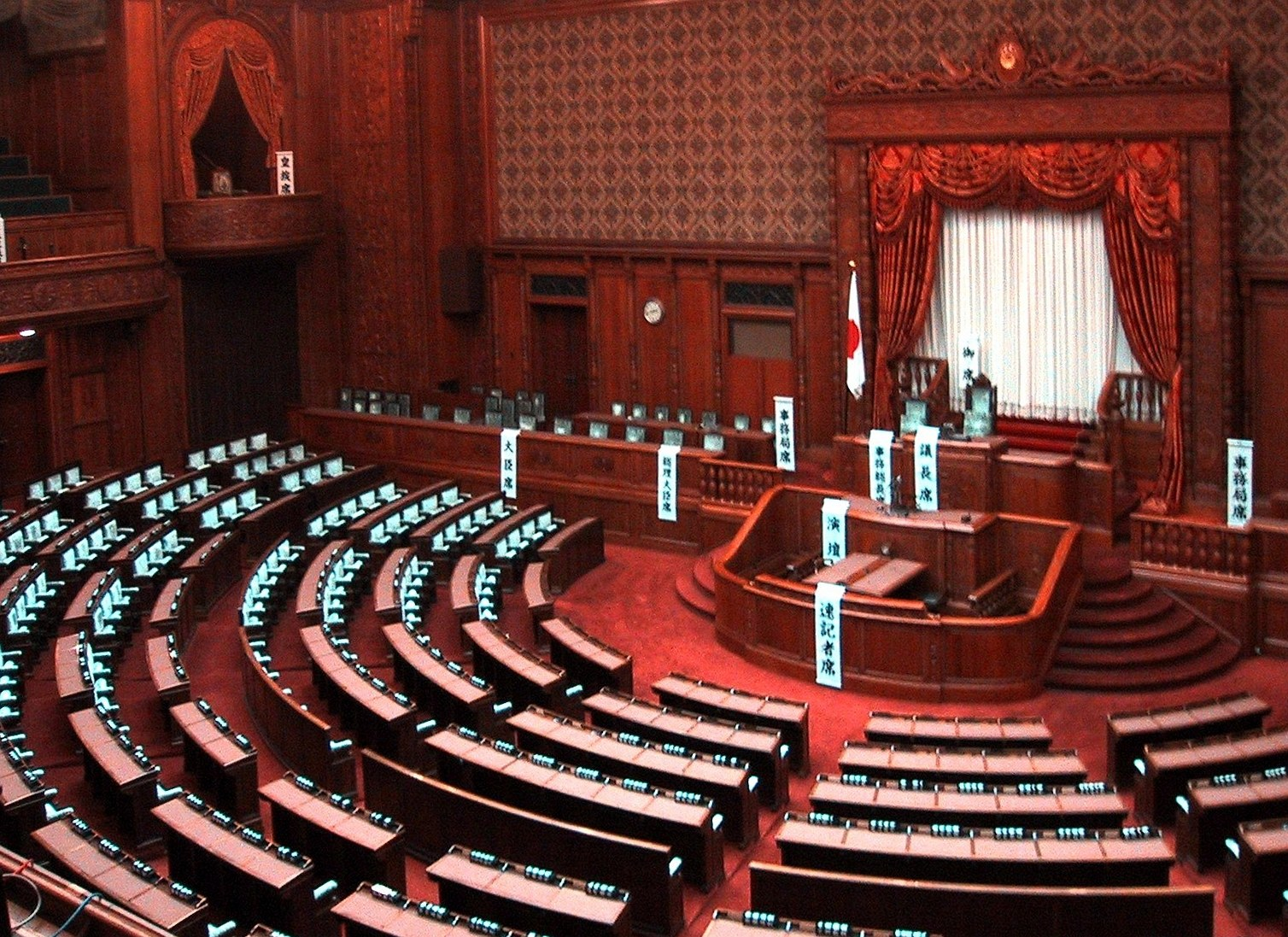
Senate Chamber

The two chambers of the National Diet of Japan.

In Japan, any organization that supports a candidate needs to register itself as a political party. Each of these parties have some local or national influence. This article lists political parties in Japan with representation in the National Diet, either in the House of Representatives (lower house) or in the Senate (upper house). The article also mentions political parties within the nation that either used to be within representation, or parties that currently are.

== Current parties ==
=== Main parties ===
Party	Abbr.	Leader(s)	Ideology	National Diet		Governors (Note: 41 of the 47 governors are independents.)
Party	Abbr.	Leader(s)	Ideology	Representatives	Senators	Governors
Liberal Democratic Party; 自由民主党; Jiyū Minshu-tō	LDP; 自民党; Jimin-tō	Sanae Takaichi	Conservatism; Japanese nationalism	316 / 465	101 / 248	3 / 47
Japan Innovation Party; 日本維新の会; Nippon Ishin no Kai	JIP; 維新; Ishin	Hirofumi Yoshimura; Fumitake Fujita	Libertarian conservatism Right-wing populism	36 / 465	19 / 248	2 / 47
Democratic Party For the People; 国民民主党; Kokumin Minshu-tō	DPP; 国民; Kokumin	Yuichiro Tamaki	Conservatism; Populism	28 / 465	25 / 248	1 / 47
Komeito; 公明党; Kōmeitō	NKP; 公明; Kōmei	Toshiko Takeya	Buddhist democracy Social conservatism	28 / 465	21 / 248	0 / 47
Constitutional Democratic Party; 立憲民主党; Rikken Minshu-tō	CDP; 立憲; Rikken	Shunichi Mizuoka	Liberalism; Social liberalism	0 / 465	39 / 248	0 / 47
Sanseitō; 参政党; Sanseitō	DIY; 参政党; Sanseitō	Sohei Kamiya	Right-wing populism Ultraconservatism	15 / 465	15 / 248	0 / 47
Democratic Reform Party; 民主改革の会; Minshu Kaikaku no Kai	DRP; 改革; Kaikaku	Junya Ogawa	Centrism; Liberalism	18 / 465	0 / 248	0 / 47
Team Mirai; チームみらい; Chīmu Mirai	Mirai; みらい; Mirai	Takahiro Anno	E-democracy	11 / 465	1 / 248	0 / 47
Japanese Communist Party; 日本共産党; Nihon Kyōsan-tō	JCP; 共産党; Kyōsan-tō	Tomoko Tamura	Communism; Progressivism	4 / 465	7 / 248	0 / 47
Party of Life; いのちの党; Inochi no Tō	いのち; Inochi	Joji Yamamoto	Progressivism; Left-wing populism	1 / 465	5 / 248	0 / 47
Conservative Party of Japan; 日本保守党; Nippon Hoshutō	CPJ; 保守党; Hoshu-tō	Naoki Hyakuta	Japanese ultranationalism Right-wing populism	0 / 465	2 / 248	0 / 47
Social Democratic Party; 社会民主党; Shakai Minshu-tō	SDP; 社民党; Shamin-tō	Mizuho Fukushima	Social democracy Progressivism	0 / 465	2 / 248	0 / 47
Centrist Reform Alliance; 中道改革連合; Chūdō Kaikaku Rengō	CRA; 中道; Chūdō	Sō Watanabe	Centrism	1 / 465	0 / 248	0 / 47

Legal status as a political party (seitō) is tied to having five members in the Diet or one member and at least two percent nationally of either proportional or majoritarian vote in one of the three elections of the current members of the National Diet, i.e. the last House of Representatives general election and the last two Senate regular elections. Political parties receive public party funding (¥ 250 per citizen, about ¥ 32 bill. in total per fiscal year, distributed according to recent national elections results – last HR general and last two HC regular elections – and Diet strength on January 1), are allowed to concurrently nominate candidates for the House of Representatives in an electoral district and on a proportional list, may take political donations from legal persons, i.e. corporations, and other benefits such as air time on public broadcaster NHK.

=== Local parties ===
Under Japanese law, all of the parties below are "political organizations" (seiji dantai), not "political parties" (seitō, see above).

==== Parties represented in prefectural assemblies ====
- Genzei Nippon ("Tax Cuts Japan"), party founded by Nagoya mayor Takashi Kawamura in 2010, mainly active in Nagoya municipal and Aichi prefectural politics, won some seats in other areas in the 2011 local elections, had its first National Diet member in 2011, achieved party status in 2012, decided to merge into Datsu-Genpatsu in November 2012 (2010–2012). Currently active in local Nagoya politics. It merged with the far-right Conservative Party of Japan in October 2023.
- New Socialist Party of Japan, a left breakaway group from the Japanese Socialist Party, created in 1996 when the latter formed the Social Democratic Party; the New Socialist Party was represented in the national Diet from 1996 to 1998.
- Several member organizations of the Japan People's Political Network, a federation of local consumer movements that entered politics in the 1970s includes:
  - Chiba Prefecture Citizens Movement
  - Citizen Network of Saitama
  - Kanagawa Network Movement
  - Tokyo Seikatsusha Network
  - Tukuba Shimin Network
- Chiiki Seitō Iwate ("Iwate regional party", 2010–) of former Social Democrats and independents
- Kyoto Party (Kyōto-tō, 2010–)
- Osaka Restoration Association, the dominant party in Ōsaka prefecture formed by the former governor Tōru Hashimoto who wants to dissolve Ōsaka city and Sakai city and turn them into Special wards of Ōsaka. Affiliated with the Nippon Ishin no Kai.
- Tomin First no Kai
- Okinawa Social Mass Party (Okinawa Shakai Taishū-tō), formerly the Okinawa Socialist Mass Party.
- Green Niigata, Midori Niigata (Niigata, communist)
  - formerly Niigata New Party for People, Shimin Shin-tō Niigata (Niigata, communist)
- Fukui Party, active in the Fukui Prefecture

==== Other parties represented in local councils ====
- Greens Japan (Midori no Tō, lit. "Green Party"), created in 2012 as the successor of Greens Japan (Midori no Mirai, lit. "Green Future"), a green party formed by the merger of the conservative-green Greens Japan (Midori no Table, "Green Table") and the left-wing-green Rainbow and Greens (Niji to Midori) in 2008.
- Happiness Realization Party (far-right, 2009–), previously held a seat in the Senate
- Citizens Network Hokkaido, a member of the Japan People's Political Network
- Citizen Politics Network of Fukuoka, a member of the Japan People's Political Network
- Tsubasa Party (far-right, 2019–), gained notoriety during the 2024 Tokyo gubernatorial election due to alleged election interference, harassment and sabotage

=== Other parties ===
Active political parties that used to be in the Diet but are not currently represented:

- Rikken Yōseikai (far-right, 1923–1942, 1946–)
- Dainiin Club Dainiin Kurabu (1983–)
- New Party for Salaried Men Sararīman Shintō (centrist, 1983–)
- Takeru (centrist, 2001–)
- Political Group of Okinawa Revolution (Sōzō, lit. Creation), Okinawa regionalist party formed by LDP defectors in 2005, represented in the national Diet from 2005 to 2008, merged with the PNP Okinawa prefectural federation in 2012, keeping its name
- Collaborative Party (right-wing populist, 2013–)

Japan has other minor parties not represented in Parliament (which have never been represented before), some are new, others with communist and socialist ideologies, as well as a few nationalist, reformist, and far-right parties. Some of them include:

- National Socialist Japanese Workers' Party (far-right) (1982–present)
- Japan Nation Party (nationalist) (1988–present)
- Ishin Seitō Shimpū (far-right) (1995–present)
- Tokyo Tea Party (inspired by the U.S. Tea Party movement) (2010–present)
- Ainu Party, party representing the rights of the Ainu people. (indigenous rights) (2012–present)
- Japan First Party (far-right) (2016–present)
- Pirate Party Japan, based on the Swedish Pirate Party
- Greater Japan Patriotic Party (far-right) (1951–present)
- Kariyushi Club Kariyushi Kurabu (Okinawa, independentist)
- Japanese Communist Party (Action Faction) (far-left) (1980–present)
- Japanese Communist Party (Left Faction) (far-left) (1969–present)
- Chūkaku-ha (far-left) (1959–present)
- Japan Revolutionary Communist League (far-left) (Trotskyism) (1959–present)
- AI Party (Government by algorithm) (2018–present)
- Horiemon New Party (right-wing populist) (2020–present)
- Nihon Yamato Party (far-right) (2025–present)

== Defunct parties ==
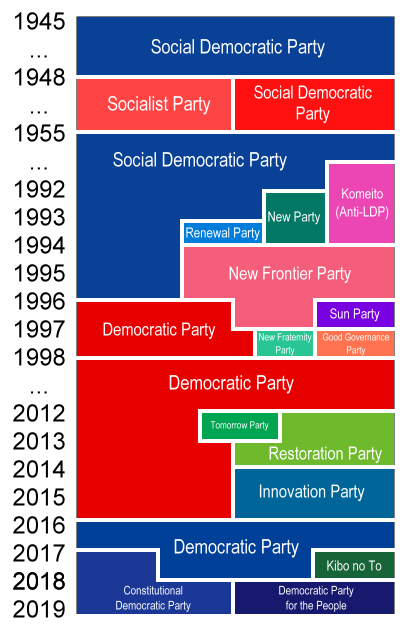
Timeline of major Non-LDP mainstream political parties.

=== Former major parties ===
- Liberal Party (Jiyūtō): initially Constitutional Liberal Party (Rikken Jiyūtō), the strongest party in the early House of Representatives and the mainstream liberal opposition to government military spending and foreign policy (1890–1898)
- Progressive Party (Shinpotō): created during a temporary alliance between Liberals and the oligarchy (1896–1898)
- Constitutional Party (Kenseitō): formed by a merger of Liberal and Progressive Party (1898–1900)
- True Constitutional Party (Kensei Hontō): breakaway of liberals discontented with the alliance with the government (1898–1910)
- Rikken Seiyūkai: formed in 1900 by a now permanent alliance between parts of the Meiji oligarchy, the bureaucracy and members of the liberal parties it became the dominant force in party politics throughout the Empire (1900–1940)
- Constitutional People's Party (Rikken Kokumintō, created in a merger of the True Constitutional Party with smaller groups, the party pushed the government for an expansion of constitutional rights (1910–1922)
- Rikken Dōshikai (1913–1916), another attempt by Katsura Tarō to form a strong opposition to the Seiyūkai (1913–1916)
- Constitutional Assembly (Kenseikai, the core group of the constitutional movement in the Taishō era (1916–1927)
- True Seiyū Party (Seiyū Hontō): a Seiyūkai breakaway during the "three constitutional factions" (goken sampa) alliance between Seiyūkai, Kenseikai and Kakushin Club ("Reform Club") (1923–1926)
- Constitutional Democratic Party (Rikken Minseitō, main opponent of the Seiyūkai in the final years of party rule and during the rise of the military (1927–1940)
- Imperial Rule Assistance Association (1940–1945)
- Japanese Liberal Party (JLP or LP; Nihon Jiyūtō, mainstream democratic conservative party around former Seiyūkai politicians (1945–1948)
- Japanese Progressive Party (Nihon Shinpotō): conservative party around former Minseitō politicians (1945–1947)
- Japanese Socialist Party (JSP; Nihon Shakaitō): divided into Left JSP and Right JSP in the early 1950s), a small minority before the war, the Socialists became the main opposition to the soon united conservatives, but continually lost ground to more centrist opposition parties over the decades (1945–1996)
- Summer breeze assembly (Ryokufūkai, reestablished several times after), created as the largest parliamentary group in the first Senate by conservatives and some liberals and moderate socialists including a number of former House of Peers members, it had a centrist approach and was willing to work with centre-left and centre-right cabinets (1947–1960)
- Democratic Party (1947) (DP; Minshutō): created by the Progressive Party and a Liberal breakaway group, the party tried to occupy the "centre" between Liberals and Socialists, but was soon divided over cooperation with either group (1947–1950)
- Democratic Liberal Party (DLP or LP; Minshujiyūtō, created from the Liberal Party when Democrats opposed to the coalition with the Socialists joined it (1948–1950)
- Liberal Party (LP; Jiyūtō): created after the Democrats had finally split over cooperation with the Liberal government, but soon divided itself into followers of first JLP president Hatoyama Ichirō who returned to politics when the SCAP purge was lifted and the "Yoshida school" of his successor Yoshida Shigeru. forefather of Liberal Democratic Party (1950–1955)
- Japanese Democratic Party (JDP; Nihon Minshutō): Hatoyama-led breakaway from the liberals merged with smaller groups including the opposition remnants of the Democratic Party; the "conservative merger" (hoshu gōdō) of 1955 united Liberal Party and Japanese Democratic Party in the Liberal Democratic Party that dominated postwar politics for decades. Forefather of Liberal Democratic Party. (1954–1955)
- New Frontier Party (NFP; Shinshintō, lit. "New Progressive Party"), formed after an anti-LDP government had collapsed to create a unified opposition party ranging from socialists to conservatives (1994–1997)
- Democratic Party of Japan (DPJ; Minshutō): the DPJ was founded in 1998 as a result of the merger of several anti-LDP opposition parties, and was the ruling party in 2009–2012. Its membership covered a broad spectrum of political beliefs, but it was generally considered a centrist party. (1998–2016)
- Japan Restoration Party (JRP; Nippon Ishin no Kai): the JRP was founded by Tōru Hashimoto the Governor of Osaka Prefectire in 2012 as a result of the merger of several right-wing regional parties, and was the third biggest political block in the National Diet. (2012–2014)
- Japan Innovation Party (JIP; Ishin no Tō): formed by a merger of the right-wing JRP and centre-right Unity Party, the Osaka regional group split off the JIP as Initiatives from Osaka in 2015 and the centre-right JIP later merged with the DPJ. (2014–2016)
- Democratic Party (DP; Minshintō): formed by a merger of the remainder of JIP and the DPJ, the party splinter during the 2017 general election among four groups: the centre-left CDP, the centre-right Kibō no Tō, group of centre align independent block, and the a centre align block remain with the DP. After the election, the more left-leaning centre group join the CDP or remain independent, while the right-leaning centre group merged with the Kibō no Tō to established the DPP. (2016–2018)
- Free Education For All (教育無償化を実現する会, Kyōiku mushō-ka o jitsugen suru Kai, lit. "Party to Realize Free Education"): A political party that existed from 30 November 2023 to 3 October 2024 and had four members of the House of Representatives and one member of the Senate. It merged into Nippon Ishin no Kai on 3 October 2024.

=== Others ===
==== Pre- and early constitutional era ====
- Freedom and People's Rights Movement and liberal parties in the early House of Representatives
  - Public Party of Patriots (Aikoku Kōtō, 1874, briefly reestablished in 1890 and merged into the (Rikken) Jiyūtō)
  - Self-help Society (Risshisha, 1874–1883)
  - Patriot Society (Aikokusha, 1875–1880)
  - Liberal Party (Jiyūtō, 1881–1884)
  - Constitutional Progressive Party (Rikken Kaishintō, 1882–1896), merged with other groups to form the Progressive Party (Shinpotō)
  - Daidō Club (1889–1890)
  - Liberal Party (Jiyūtō, 1890), merged with other groups to form the Rikken Jiyūtō
  - Oriental Liberal Party (Tōyō Jiyūtō, 1892–1893), asianist, radical liberal
- Opponents and "moderate faction" (onwa-ha, meaning pro-government; also ritō, "official parties") in the early House of Representatives
  - Constitutional Imperial Rule Party (Rikken Teiseitō, 1882–1883)
  - Great Achievement Association (Taiseikai, 1890–1891)
  - People's Liberal Party (Kokumin Jiyūtō, 1890–1891)
  - Central Negotiations Assembly (Chūō Kōshōkai, 1892–1893)
  - People's Association (Kokumin Kyōkai, 1892–1899)
  - Great Japanese Association (Dainihon Kyōkai, 1893)
  - Independent Club (Dokuritsu Club)
  - Same-minded Club (Dōshi Club)

==== Empire of Japan until 1940 ====
- Imperial Party (Teikokutō, 1899–1905)
- Daidō Club (1905–1910)
- Yūkōkai (1906–1908)
- Centre Club (Chūō Club, 1910–1913)
- Impartial Association, also Upright Party (Chūseikai, 1913–1916)
- Reform Club (Kakushin Club, 1922–1925)
- Impartial Club (Chūsei Club, 1924–1925)
- Shinsei Club (1925–1928)
- Reform Party (Kakushintō, 1927–1932)
- Kokumin Dōshikai (1929–1932)
- People's Union (Kokumin Dōmei, 1932–1940)
- Shōwakai (1935–1937)
- Tōhōkai (1936–1944)

===== Socialist and labour movement =====
- Social Democratic Party (Shakaiminshutō, 1901)
- Japan Socialist Party (1906) (Nihon Shakaitō, 1906–1907)
- Japanese Commoners Party (Nihon Heimintō, 1906–)
- Farmers and Workers Party (Nōminrōdōtō, 1925)
- Workers and Farmers Party (Rōdōnōmintō, 1926–1928)
- Japanese Workers and Farmers Party (Nihon Rōnōtō, 1926–1928)
- Japan Farmers Party (Nihon Nōmintō, 1926–1928)
- Social People Party (Shakai Minshūtō, 1926–1932)
- Workers and Farmers Party (Rōdōshanōmintō, 1928–)
- Japanese Masses Party (Nihon Taishūtō, 1928–1930)
- Workers and Farmers Party (Rōnōtō, 1929–1931)
- National Masses Party (Zenkoku Taishūtō, 1930–1931)
- National Workers and Farmers Mass Party (Zenkoku Rōnōtaishūtō, 1931–1932)
- Socialist Masses Party (Shakai Taishūtō, 1932–1940)

In 1940, all remaining political parties with the exception of the Tōhōkai became part of the Imperial Rule Assistance Association or were banned.

==== Postwar Japan ====
Note: Postwar parties often give themselves "English" names which sometimes differ significantly from translations of their Japanese names.

===== LDP precursor and breakaway parties =====
- Japanese Cooperative Party (Nihon Kyōdōtō, centrist party promoting cooperativism by prewar Minseitō politician Sanehiko Yamamoto (1945–1946),
- Cooperative Democratic Party (Kyōdō Minshutō, created by a merger of the Japanese Cooperative Party with smaller groups (1946–1947),
- National Party (Kokumintō, centrist party formed by independents and mini-parties (1946–1947),
- National Cooperative Party (Kokumin Kyōdōtō, 1947–1950), merger of Cooperative Democratic Party and People's Party (1947–1950),
- Japan Farmers' Party (Nihon Nōmintō, farmers' party mostly represented in Hokkaidō
- New Farmers' Party (Nōminshintō, (1947–1949)
- Farmers' Cooperative Party (Nōmin Kyōdōtō, in 1952 some members joined the Progressive Party, others joined the Cooperative Party, a breakaway of right-wing socialists from the JSP (1949–1952)
- People's Democratic Party (Kokumin Minshutō, created after the Democratic Party split by a merger of the Democratic opposition wing with the People's Cooperative Party of Takeo Miki (1950–1952)
- New Political Club (Shinsei Club, group around prewar Minseitō politicians returning to politics after the SCAP purge had been lifted, joined the Progressive Party (1951–1952)
- Japanese Reconstruction League (Nihon Saiken Renmei, group around prewar Minseitō politicians returning to politics after the SCAP purge had been lifted, joined the Liberal Party (1952–1953)
- Progressive Party (Kaishintō, merger of People's Democratic Party with parts of the Farmers' Cooperative Party and the Shinsei Club, became part of Hatoyama's Japanese Democratic Party in 1954 (1952–1954)
- Japanese Liberal Party (Nihon Jiyūtō, 1953), generally referred to as Secessionist Liberal Party (buntōha jiyūtō) or Hatoyama Liberal Party, the first breakaway of Ichirō Hatoyama and his followers from the Liberal Party, a majority including Hatoyama returned to the Liberal Party later that year (1953–1953)
- Japanese Liberal Party (1953) (Nihon Jiyūtō, small group from Hatoyama's Liberal Party that didn't want to return to Yoshida's Liberal Party, joined Hatoyama's Japanese Democratic Party in 1954 (1953–1954)
- New Liberal Club (Shin Jiyū Club, 1976–1986), breakaway of LDP Diet members predominantly from urban constituencies, in a joint parliamentary group with the Social Democratic Federation in the early 1980s, then part of a coalition government with the LDP under Yasuhiro Nakasone, most returned to the LDP in 1986 (1976–1986)
- Tax Party (Zeikintō, 1983–1990), party of former New Liberal Club member Chinpei Nozue (1983–1990)
- Progressive Party (Shinpotō, party of New Liberal Club member Seiichi Tagawa who didn't return to the LDP, dissolved after Tagawa's retirement from politics (1987–1993)
- New Party Harbinger (Shintō Sakigake, centrist, reformist-ecologist, LDP breakaway in the 1993 no-confidence vote against the Miyazawa Cabinet (1993–1998)
- New Future Party (Shintō Mirai, 1994), breakaway of five Mitsuzuka faction Representatives, joined the New Frontier Party (1993–1994)
- Japan Renewal Party (Shinseitō, lit. "Renewal Party", liberal, breakaway of the Hata-Ozawa faction from the LDP in the 1993 no-confidence vote against the Miyazawa Cabinet, joined the New Frontier Party (1993–1994)
- Kōshikai (1994), breakaway of LDP Diet members opposed to the Grand Coalition with the JSP, joined the New Frontier Party (1994–1994)
- Sakigake Party (Sakigake, lit. "Harbinger", New Party Harbinger successor after some Diet members had joined the Democratic Party (1998–2002)
- Japan Greens (Midori no Kaigi, lit. "Green Conference", Sakigake successor of Councillor (until 2004) Atsuo Nakamura (2002–2004)
- Japan Greens (Midori no Table, lit. "Green Table", "Green Conference" successor, merged with left-wing ecologist Rainbow and Greens to form "Japan Greens" (Midori no Mirai) (2004–2008)
- People's New Party (PNP; Kokumin Shintō, 2005–2013) (2005–2013)
- Sunrise Party (Taiyō no Tō, "Party of the Sun"), formed in November 2012 by Takeo Hiranuma's Sunrise Party of Japan (Tachiagare Nippon, "Rise up, Japan") and Shintarō Ishihara who resigned as governor of Tokyo to return to national politics, merged into Japan Restoration Party in November 2012 (2010–2012)

===== JSP breakaway parties =====
- Socialist Reform Party (Shakai Kakushintō, renamed (1948–1951)
- Workers and Farmers Party (Rōdōshanōmintō, rejoined the JSP (1948–1957)
- Social Democratic Party (Shakaiminshutō, 1951–1952), renamed
- Cooperative Party (Kyōdōtō, 1952), (re-)joined the right-wing Socialists (1952–1952)
- Democratic Socialist Party (Japan) (Minshu-shakaitō, abbreviated and later officially Minshatō, social-democratic, broke off from the JSP over the US-Japanese security treaty of 1960, joined the NFP (1960–1994)
- Socialist Citizens' Federation (Shakai Shimin Rengō, right-wing JSP breakaway around Saburō Eda (1977–1978)
- Socialist Club (Shakai Club, right-wing JSP breakaway around Hideo Den (1977–1978)
- Social Democratic Federation (Shakaiminshu Rengō, merger of Socialist Citizens' Federation and Socialist Club, led by Hideo Den, then by Eda's son Satsuki, in a joint parliamentary group with the New Liberal Club in the early 1980s, dissolved in 1994, most members joined Japan New Party (1978–1994)
- New Party 'Liberals for Protecting the Constitution' (Shintō Goken Liberal, party around Hideo Den, opposed to the NFP and supporting the JSP-LDP Murayama Cabinet, split into Heiwa Shimin (Peace – Citizens) and Kenpō Midori-nō no Rentai (Constitution, Green Agriculture Collective), Den joined the Sangiin Forum (1994–1995)
- Citizens' League (Shimin Rengō, JSP breakaway opposed to the "Grand" Coalition with the LDP around Sadao Yamahana and Banri Kaieda, joined the Democratic Party (1995–1996)

===== Other NFP and DPJ precursor and breakaway parties =====
- Rengō no Kai formed as political arm of the newly formed RENGO trade union federation (a merger of JSP-aligned Sōhyō and DSP-aligned Dōmei), helped win an opposition majority in the Senate in 1989, renamed (1989–1993)
- Japan New Party (Nihon Shintō, liberal, (1992–1994)
- Democratic Reform Party (Minshu Kaikaku Rengō, lit. "Democratic Reform League", joined the "new" Democratic Party (1993–1998)
- New Kōmei Party (Kōmei Shintō, "New Justice Party", 1994), one of two groups resulting from the dissolution of Kōmeitō (1994–1994)
- Sun Party (Taiyōtō, liberal reformist, NFP breakaway around Tsutomu Hata, joined Minseitō (1996–1998)
- Democratic Party of Japan (1996–1998) (Minshutō, "Democratic Party", liberal, 1996–1998), formed by Naoto Kan Yukio Hatoyama and of New Party Harbinger, then part of the Grand Coalition with LDP and SDP, together with SDP and NFP politicians; after the dissolution of the NFP most successor parties joined the DPJ parliamentary group and merged a few months later to form the "new" Democratic Party (1996–1998)
- From Five, NFP breakaway around Morihiro Hosokawa, joined Minseitō (1997–1998)
- New Fraternity Party (Shintō Yūai, liberal reformist, 1998), NFP successor around Kansei Nakano (1998–1998)
- Liberal Party (Japan, 1998) (Jiyūtō, liberal, 1998–2003), party of Ichirō Ozawa followers after the New Frontier Party had dissolved, joined the LDP in a coalition government from 1999 to 2000 (1998–2003)
- Good Governance Party (Minseitō, "Democratic Party", liberal, 1998), merger of three member parties of the DPJ parliamentary group (1998–1998)
- Voice of the People (Kokumin no Koe, 1998), NFP successor around Michihiko Kano, joined Minseitō (1998–1998)
- Reform Club (Kaikaku Club, NFP successor around Tatsuo Ozawa (1998–2002)
- New Peace Party (Shintō Heiwa, 1998), NFP successor of former Kōmeitō Representatives, reestablished Kōmeitō (1998–1998)
- Dawn Club (Reimei Club, 1998), NFP successor of former Kōmeitō Senators, merged with Kōmei and reestablished Kōmeitō (1998–1998)
- Conservative Party (Japan) (Hoshutō, liberal, 2000–2002), a breakaway group from the Liberal Party wanting to continue the coalition with the LDP and Kōmeitō (2000–2002)
- New Conservative Party (Hoshushintō, liberal, 2002–2003), merger of parts of the Conservative Party (others returned to the LDP) with a breakaway group from the Democratic Party, joined the LDP (2002–2003)
- Japan Renaissance Party (Kaikaku Club, lit. "Reform Club", conservative, formed during the "twisted Diet" (nejire kokkai, opposition majority in the Senate) by Democratic and independent Senators ready to cooperate with the LDP-Kōmeitō government, formed New Renaissance Party
- New Renaissance Party (Kaikaku Shintō, lit. "New Reform Party"; 2010–2016)
- Kizuna Party (Shintō Kizuna, "New Kizuna Party"), founded in December 2011 by former Ozawa Democrats, opposed to VAT hike, opposed to joining TPP, merged into People's Life First in 2012 (2011–2012)
- People's Life First (Kokumin no Seikatsu ga Daiichi, LF), founded by Ichirō Ozawa and other DPJ Diet members opposing a planned sales tax increase in Summer 2012, merged into TPJ in November 2012 (2012–2012)

===== Others =====
- Japanese Women's Party (Nihon Joseitō, 1977), short-lived party of feminist leader Misako Enoki (1977–1977)
- Welfare Party (Fukushitō, 1983–?), party of Representative Eita Yashiro who joined the LDP in 1984, the party never won a seat in the Diet again and eventually dissolved
- Sports and Peace Party (Supōtsu Heiwa Tō, centrist, (1989–2004)
- Truth Party (Shinritō, 1989–?), party of Ōmu Shinrikyō founder Shōkō Asahara, its 25 candidates in the 1990 House of Representatives election altogether but a few thousand votes
- Nakayoshi no Tō, a women's party that regularly contested Senate proportional elections (1993–2016)
- Kōmei ("Justice", one of two groups resulting from the dissolution of Kōmeitō, merged with Reimei Club and reestablished Kōmeitō (1994–1998)
- Liberal League (Jiyū Rengō, libertarian, (1994–2005)
- House of Councillors Forum (Sangiin Forum, group formed by ex-SDF Councillor Hideo Den and independents (Motoo Shiina and others) (1995–1996)
- Rainbow and Greens (Niji to Midori, green, (1998–2008)
  - formerly House of Councillors Club (Sangiin Club, centrist, parliamentary group of Motoo Shiina, Masami Tanabu and others (1998–1999)
- Independents (Mushozoku no Kai, lit. "assembly of independents", centrist, (1999–2004)
- The Spirit of Japan Party (Nippon Sōshintō, lit. "Japan Innovation Party"), formed by prefectural and municipal politicians in 2010, dissolved to join Japan Restoration Party in 2012 (2010–2012)
- Tax Cuts Japan (Genzei Nippon – Han TTP – Datsu-Genpatsu o Jitsugen suru Tō, "Tax Cuts Japan, Anti-TPP, Nuclear Phaseout Realization Party"; Datsu-Genpatsu), founded in a merger of Genzei Nippon ("Tax Cuts Japan") and Han-TPP in November 2012, merged into TPJ in November 2012 (2012–2012)
- "Anti-TPP, Nuclear Phaseout, Consumption Tax Hike Freeze Realization Party" (Han-TPP — Datsu-Genpatsu — Shōhizei Zōzei Tōketsu wo Jitsugen Suru Tō; Han-TPP), founded by Masahiko Yamada and Shizuka Kamei in November 2012 following their respective departures from the DPJ and the PNP, merged with Genzei Nippon in November 2012. (2012–2012)
- Tomorrow Party of Japan Nippon Mirai no Tō, short-lived anti-nuclear party formed by a merger between Ichirō Ozawa's People's Life First and the Datsu-Genpatsu ("nuclear phaseout") party, itself a merger of Masahiko Yamada's Han-TPP ("anti-TPP") and Takashi Kawamura's Genzei Nippon ("Tax cuts Japan"), and the Representatives who had joined Green Wind. Lost all of its seats and dissolved into Green Wind in 2013. (2012–2013)
- Green Wind - Another short-lived anti-nuclear party. Dissolved in 2013. (2012–2013)
- Party for Japanese Kokoro (Nippon no Kokoro) - Originally established as the 'Party for Future Generations' in 2014, led by Shintaro Ishihara. Split from the Japan Restoration Party, its last member was transferred to the LDP in 2018 and the party was dissolved. (2014–2018)
- Internet Breakthrough Party of Japan (led by Iron Chef Commentator and Judge and former LDP member Shinichirō Kurimoto)
- Kibō no Tō, Party of Hope, national version of the localist party Tomin First no Kai. At the beginning it attached many electors from the left-leaning Democratic Party, but in 2018 most of those members left for Democratic Party for the People. As remaining party members continue to leave the party, the party disbanded in year 2021 as its last representative announced retirement. (2017–2021)
- Kyowa Party (lit. Republican Party, (2020–present) formed by former Prime Minister and Democratic Party of Japan leader Yukio Hatoyama
- Centrist Reform Alliance (2026). Brief party which included centre and centre-left parties to unite for the 2026 general elections.

===== Political parties in U.S. Okinawa =====
- Okinawa People's Party (Okinawa Jinmintō, communist, 1947–1973), joined the Japanese Communist Party after the return to the mainland
- Okinawa Social Mass Party (Okinawa Shakai Taishūtō, pro-reversion, socialist, 1950–), after the return to the mainland, a merger with the Japanese Socialist Party was planned, and its only Representative joined the DSP, but the party continues to exist as a regional party
- Ryukyu Democratic Party (Ryūkyū Minshutō, conservative, 1952–1959)
- Okinawa Liberal Democratic Party (1959) (Okinawa Jiyūminshutō, 1959–?), split over the "Caraway whirlwind" of High Commissioner Lt. Gen. Paul W. Caraway
- Democratic Party (Minshutō, 1964–1967), renamed
- Okinawa Liberal Democratic Party (1967) (Okinawa Jiyūminshutō, 1967–1970), became the prefectural federation of the mainland Liberal Democratic Party

== See also ==
- Politics of Japan
- Liberalism in Japan
- List of political parties by country
- Political party
- Uyoku dantai
