= Japan Cooperative Party (1946–47) =

Political party

Japan Cooperative Party 日本協同党
- Founded: August 1946
- Dissolved: 1947
- Succeeded by: Japan Farmers Party
- Headquarters: Tokyo
- Ideology: Liberalism; Agrarianism
- Political position: Centre

The Japan Cooperative Party (Japanese: 日本協同党, Nihon Kyōdōtō) was a political party in Japan.

== History ==
The party was established by Katsutarō Kita in August 1946 when he was expelled from the Cooperative Democratic Party due to his refusal to compromise on the cooperative aspect of party policy during merger talks with Shinseikai. The new party was named after the original Japan Cooperative Party, which had merged into the Cooperative Democratic Party in May 1946.

In 1947 it was dissolved when Kita formed the Japan Farmers Party.
