= Susumu Nikaidō =

Japanese politician

- 二階堂 進
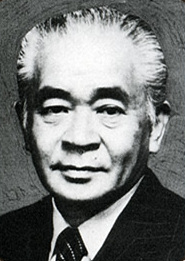
- Nikaidō in 1966

Vice President of the Liberal Democratic Party
- In office April 1984 – July 1986
- President: Yasuhiro Nakasone
- Secretary-General: Rokusuke Tanaka; Shin Kanemaru
- Preceded by: Eiichi Nishimura (1980)
- Succeeded by: Shin Kanemaru (1992)

Secretary-General of the Liberal Democratic Party
- In office November 1981 – December 1983
- President: Zenkō Suzuki; Yasuhiro Nakasone
- Preceded by: Yoshio Sakurauchi
- Succeeded by: Rokusuke Tanaka
- In office November 1974 – December 1974
- President: Kakuei Tanaka
- Vice President: Etsusaburo Shiina
- Preceded by: Tomisaburō Hashimoto
- Succeeded by: Yasuhiro Nakasone

Chief Cabinet Secretary
- In office 7 July 1972 – 11 November 1974
- Prime Minister: Kakuei Tanaka
- Preceded by: Noboru Takeshita
- Succeeded by: Noboru Takeshita

Director-General of the Hokkaido Development Agency
- In office 3 December 1966 – 25 November 1967
- Prime Minister: Eisaku Satō
- Preceded by: Shigesaburō Maeo
- Succeeded by: Takeo Kimura

Director-General of the Science and Technology Agency
- In office 3 December 1966 – 25 November 1967
- Prime Minister: Eisaku Satō
- Preceded by: Kiichi Arita
- Succeeded by: Naotsugu Nabeshima

Member of the House of Representatives
- In office 27 February 1955 – 27 September 1996
- Preceded by: Ryōkichi Nagata
- Succeeded by: Constituency abolished
- Constituency: Kagoshima 3rd
- In office 23 January 1949 – 28 August 1952
- Preceded by: Kin'emon Matoba
- Succeeded by: Ryōkichi Nagata
- Constituency: Kagoshima 3rd
- In office 11 April 1946 – 31 March 1947
- Preceded by: Constituency established
- Succeeded by: Multi-member district
- Constituency: Kagoshima at-large

Personal details
- Born: 16 October 1909 Kōyama, Kagoshima, Japan
- Died: 3 February 2000 (aged 90) Shinjuku, Tokyo, Japan
- Party: Liberal Democratic
- Other political affiliations: JCP (1945–1946); CDP (1946–1947); NCP (1947–1958); DLP (1948–1950); LP (1950–1955)
- Education: University of Southern California

Susumu Nikaido (二階堂 進, Nikaidō Susumu; October 16, 1909 – February 3, 2000) was a Japanese politician who served in the House of Representatives and as Chief Cabinet Secretary from 1972 to 1974. He was a member of the Liberal Democratic Party and headed one of its most powerful factions in the 1980s.

== Early life ==
Nikaidō was born in Kagoshima Prefecture. He moved to the United States in 1932, and graduated from the University of Southern California with a degree in political science. He remained in the United States until August 1941, when he returned to Japan on the Tatsuta Maru. During World War II, he worked in the Ministry of Foreign Affairs and as a non-combatant in the Imperial Japanese Navy.

== Political career ==
Nikaidō unsuccessfully ran as an opposition candidate for the House of Representatives in the 1942 general election. Following the war, he was involved in the formation of the Japan Cooperative Party (1945) and National Cooperative Party (1947). He won his first elected seat in the House of Representatives in the country's first postwar general election in 1946, lost his bid for re-election in the 1947 general election, and returned to the House in the 1949 general election. During this time, he became acquainted with future political allies Kakuei Tanaka and Takeo Miki. Nikaidō lost his seat again in the 1952 general election, but returned to the House again in the 1955 general election and thereafter held his seat until retiring in 1996, winning 16 consecutive elections.

Nikaidō was a supporter of Eisaku Satō's Diet faction starting in 1957, and served in the Sato cabinet as Director of the Science and Technology Agency and Director of the Hokkaido Development Agency from 1966 to 1967. He later became a key supporter of Kakuei Tanaka, and served as Tanaka's Chief Cabinet Secretary from 1972 to 1974.

Nikaidō served as LDP Secretary-General from 1981 to 1983, during which time Tanaka was convicted of bribery for his role in the Lockheed bribery scandals (in which Nikaidō himself was not implicated). In 1984, former Prime Minister Zenkō Suzuki backed Nikaidō, who was then 75, in an ill-fated party leadership struggle against Prime Minister Yasuhiro Nakasone. Nikaidō thereafter served as LDP Vice-president from 1984 to 1986. During this time, Tanaka was hospitalized following a stroke, and Nikaidō served as titular chairman of the Tanaka faction, but was challenged by Noboru Takeshita.

Nikaidō died of heart failure in February 2000 at the age of 90.

=== Amami reversion movement ===
As a lawmaker representing Kagoshima Prefecture, Nikaidō played some role in the reversion movement of the Amami Islands, which were part of Kagoshima Prefecture but were administratively separated from Japan by the U.S. military from 1946 to 1953. In July 1950, on his way back from a visitation to Okinawa, Nikaidō visited Amami Ōshima and gave a speech at a mass rally calling for Amami's return to Japan. On August 18, he asked an "emergency question" on Amami's reversion to Japan at a Lower House plenary session. The question was a political compromise between the Diet and the Amami Islanders since the Diet was unable to pass a resolution on Amami's reversion that would conflict with a peace treaty the Diet was soon to ratify. Nevertheless, it was the first manifestation of long-standing efforts to single out Amami from the other areas under U.S. military occupation (i.e., Okinawa and Ogasawara) at the Diet to facilitate an earlier return of Amami.
