= Japan Farmers Party (1947–1949) =

Japan Farmers Party 日本農民党 Nihon Nōmintō
- Founded: 25 February 1947
- Dissolved: 1949
- Merger of: Japan Cooperative Party
- Succeeded by: New Farmers Party
- Ideology: Agrarianism; Cooperativism
- Political position: Centre

The Japan Farmers Party (日本農民党, Nihon Nōmintō) was a political party in Japan.

== History ==
The origins of the Japan Farmers Party can be traced back to the 'second' Japan Cooperative Party, which was formed in September 1946 by members of the 'former' Japan Cooperative Party, which had split from the Cooperative Democratic Party. The party was established by Katsutarō Kita and four independent members of the House of Representatives on 25 February 1947. Kita had previously formed the Japan Cooperative Party in August 1946. However, three of them, including Kita, were removed from the House of Representatives shortly afterwards as part of the post-war purge. When the party was founded, it had only five members in National Diet.

In the 1947 general elections, three of the party's twelve candidates were elected, giving them four seats. And a further four representatives joined the party after the elections. Thus, the party gained eight seats, becoming the second smallest party in the National Diet. Of the original founding members, only Shirō Nakano survived the purge and 1947 election. More than half of the party members were leaders of agricultural organisations associated with the rural youth league movement, which was spearheaded by the Hokkaido and Fukuoka branches of the National Rural Youth League (Zennōseiren). After talks about a merger with the National Cooperative Party failed due to the opposition of Nakano, the chairman of the party's central committee, the party considered renaming itself the New Farmers Party.

The party continued to operate as a minority party until November 1948. However, in the same year, the Zennōseiren sponsored the National Council for Mobilising Farmers' Political Power (Nōmin Seiji Ryoku Kesshū Zenkoku Kyōgikai) in order to inject new vitality into the farmers' political movement. The council had agreed to the formation of a new party. As a result, the Japan Farmers Party was dissolved. In December 1948, some former members of the party merged with a small group that had split from the National Cooperative Party to form the New Farmers Party (Nōmin Shintō). The 1949 general elections saw the party reduced to a single seat and it was disbanded thereafter, and effectively replaced by the New Farmers Party.

== Ideology and policies ==
The Japan Farmers Party continued to adhere to cooperativism as a core principle of its party organization. The party aimed to return to the original purpose of Kōtarō Sengoku's Japan Cooperative Party, namely the ideal of integrating the spirit of cooperativism with agricultural interests. The party's official political ideology was by no means conservative, and essentially aimed for a centrist position that belonged neither to the left nor the right. The party rejected "dictatorship by left-wing or right-wing parties," desired the establishment of a "peaceful Japan based on the principle of cooperative unionism," and recognized the need to strongly represent the interests of farmers in the reconstruction of agriculture based on rapid production increases and improvements in food self-sufficiency.
