= Sei Yoshida =

Japanese politician (1909–1976)

- 吉田 セイ

Member of the House of Representatives
- In office 10 April 1946 – 31 March 1947
- Preceded by: Constituency established
- Succeeded by: Multi-member district
- Constituency: Kanagawa at-large

Personal details
- Born: 24 December 1909 Yamaguchi Prefecture, Japan
- Died: 26 July 1976 (aged 66)
- Party: National Cooperative
- Other party: National (1946–1947)

Sei Yoshida (Japanese: 吉田セイ; 24 December 1909 – 26 July 1976) was a Japanese politician. She was one of the first group of women elected to the House of Representatives in 1946.

== Biography ==
Yoshida was born in Yamaguchi Prefecture in 1909. While at Atsusa High School, she was selected to represent Japan in shot put at the 1924 Far East Olympics, where she set a new Japanese record of 9.58m. After leaving school she qualified as a midwife, and then studied at Hiroshima Women's Dental School, graduating in 1931, after which she practiced in Tokyo. She hoped to participate in the shot put player at the 1940 Summer Olympics in Tokyo, but the event was cancelled due to World War II.

Following the war, she was a candidate of the New Japan Women's Party in Kanagawa Prefecture in the April 1946 general election and was elected to the House of Representatives. Shortly after being elected, she joined the National Party, which merged into the National Cooperative Party the following year. However, she failed to be selected as a candidate for the 1947 elections. She subsequently ran for election to the House of Representatives and House of Councillors three times without success. She later served as Superintendent of Education for Kanagawa Prefecture, as a family court mediation committee member, and a consultant for the Kanagawa Prefecture federation of the Liberal Democratic Party. She died in 1976.
