= Gunma at-large district =

Japan House of Councillors constituency

- 群馬県選挙区
- Parliamentary constituency for the House of Councillors
- Prefecture: Gunma
- Electorate: 1,570,296 (as of July 2025)

Current constituency
- Created: 1947
- Seats: 2
- Councillors: Class of 2028: Hirofumi Nakasone (LDP); Class of 2031: Masato Shimizu (LDP)

Gunma At-Large District (群馬県選挙区, Gunma-ken Senkyoku) is a constituency of the House of Councillors in the Diet of Japan (national legislature). It consists of Gunma Prefecture and elects two Councillors, one per election.

Between 1947 and 2007 Gunma was represented by four Councillors, electing two at a time by single non-transferable vote. During this period, like most two-member districts, Gunma often split seats between the Liberal Democratic Party (LDP) and the Japan Socialist Party (JSP) despite being a conservative stronghold and home to the families of Prime Ministers Fukuda, Nakasone and Obuchi. Councillors from Gunma include Fukuda's brother Hiroichi and Nakasone's son Hirofumi.

== Current Councillors ==
As of 11 February 2026, the district is currently represented by 2 Councillors, both of the Liberal Democratic Party. They are, in order of election year:

- Hirofumi Nakasone (LDP) - Class of 2028
- Masato Shimizu (LDP) - Class of 2031

== Elected Councillors ==
Class of (1947/1953/...)		Election Year	Class of (1950/1956/...)	
#1 (1947: #1, 6-year term)	#2 (1947: #2, 6-year term)	Election Year	#1 (1947: #3, 3-year term)	#2 (1947: #4, 3-year term)
Tokuzō Takekoshi (DP)	Kinichi Umezu (JSP)	1947	Sanshirō Kogure (DP)	Junichi Suzuki (DP)
Kiyoo Sakino (DP)	Kinichi Umezu (JSP)	1947 by-el.	Sanshirō Kogure (DP)	Junichi Suzuki (DP)
Kiyoo Sakino (DP)	Kinichi Umezu (JSP)	1950	Renjirō Iijima (Indep.)	Kyōhei Suzuki (DP)
Yoshio Iyoku (Yoshida LP)	Hideko Mogami (Progressive)	1953	Renjirō Iijima (Indep.)	Kyōhei Suzuki (DP)
Yoshio Iyoku (Yoshida LP)	Hideko Mogami (Progressive)	1956	Budayū Kogure (DLP)	Kendō Itō (JSP)
Yoichi Yamato (JSP)	Hideko Mogami (LDP)	1959	Budayū Kogure (DLP)	Kendō Itō (JSP)
Yoichi Yamato (JSP)	Hideko Mogami (LDP)	1962	Budayū Kogure (DLP)	Kendō Itō (JSP)
Yoichi Yamato (JSP)	Eiichirō Kondō (LDP)	1965	Budayū Kogure (DLP)	Kendō Itō (JSP)
Yoichi Yamato (JSP)	Eiichirō Kondō (LDP)	1967 by-el.	Ichirō Sata (LDP)	Kendō Itō (JSP)
Yoichi Yamato (JSP)	Eiichirō Kondō (LDP)	1968	Ichirō Sata (LDP)	Shigesada Marumo (LDP)
Shigemitsu Akanegakubo (JSP)	Kunio Takahashi (LDP)	1971	Ichirō Sata (LDP)	Shigesada Marumo (LDP)
Shigemitsu Akanegakubo (JSP)	Kunio Takahashi (LDP)	1974	Toshio Kurihara (JSP)	Susumu Mogami (LDP)
Tomio Yamamoto (LDP)	Shigemitsu Akanegakubo (JSP)	1977	Toshio Kurihara (JSP)	Susumu Mogami (LDP)
Tomio Yamamoto (LDP)	Shigemitsu Akanegakubo (JSP)	1980	Hiroichi Fukuda (LDP)	Yuzuru Yamada (JSP)
Tomio Yamamoto (LDP)	Susumu Mogami (LDP)	1983	Hiroichi Fukuda (LDP)	Yuzuru Yamada (JSP)
Tomio Yamamoto (LDP)	Susumu Mogami (LDP)	1986	Hirofumi Nakasone (LDP)	Hiroichi Fukuda (LDP)
Giichi Tsunoda (JSP)	Tomio Yamamoto (LDP)	1989	Hirofumi Nakasone (LDP)	Hiroichi Fukuda (LDP)
Giichi Tsunoda (JSP)	Tomio Yamamoto (LDP)	1992	Hirofumi Nakasone (LDP)	Kōsei Ueno (LDP)
Ichita Yamamoto (LDP)	Giichi Tsunoda (JSP)	1995	Hirofumi Nakasone (LDP)	Kōsei Ueno (LDP)
Ichita Yamamoto (LDP)	Giichi Tsunoda (JSP)	1998	Hirofumi Nakasone (LDP)	Kōsei Ueno (LDP)
Ichita Yamamoto (LDP)	Giichi Tsunoda (DPJ)	2001	Hirofumi Nakasone (LDP)	Kōsei Ueno (LDP)
Ichita Yamamoto (LDP)	Giichi Tsunoda (DPJ)	2004	Yukio Tomioka (DPJ)	Hirofumi Nakasone (LDP)
Ichita Yamamoto (LDP)	–	2007	Yukio Tomioka (DPJ)	Hirofumi Nakasone (LDP)
Ichita Yamamoto (LDP)	–	2010	Hirofumi Nakasone (LDP)	–
Ichita Yamamoto (LDP)	–	2013	Hirofumi Nakasone (LDP)	–
Ichita Yamamoto (LDP)	–	2016	Hirofumi Nakasone (LDP)	–
Masato Shimizu (LDP)	–	2019	Hirofumi Nakasone (LDP)	–
Masato Shimizu (LDP)	–	2022	Hirofumi Nakasone (LDP)	–
Masato Shimizu (LDP)	–	2025	Hirofumi Nakasone (LDP)	–

== Election results ==
=== Elections in the 2020s ===
2025
Party	Candidate	Votes	%	±%
LDP	Masato Shimizu (Incumbent)	288,284	34.86	
Sanseitō	Hitomi Aoki	260,524	31.50	
CDP	Masatake Kawamura	163,469	19.77	
JCP	Tamotsu Takahashi	49,347	5.97	
Mushozoku Rengō	Masahiko Ida	30,273	3.66	
Independent	Miki Karashima	24,497	2.96	
Anti-NHK	Muneyuki Jōraku	10,571	1.28	
Registered electors		1,570,296		
Majority		27,760	3.36	
Turnout		865,554	55.1	▲6.6
LDP hold		Swing		

2022
Party	Candidate	Votes	%	±%
LDP	Hirofumi Nakasone (Incumbent) (endorsed by Komeito)	476,017	63.8	
Independent	Keiko Shirai (Endorsed by the CDP and the DPP)	138,429	18.6	
JCP	Tamotsu Takahashi	69,490	9.3	
Sanseitō	Tetsuro Niikura	39,523	5.3	
Anti-NHK	Tadashi Kojima	22,276	3.0	
Registered electors		1,608,605		
Majority		337,588	45.2	
Turnout		780,013	48.5	
LDP hold		Swing		

=== Elections in the 2010s ===
2019
Party	Candidate	Votes	%	±%
LDP	Masato Shimizu (Endorsed by Komeito)	400,369	53.9	N/A
CDP	Atsuko Saito (Endorsed by the DPP, SDP and the JCP)	286,651	38.6	
Anti-NHK	Mikako Maeda	55,209	7.4	
Registered electors		1,630,505		
Majority		113,718	15.3	
Turnout		785,577	51.8	
LDP hold		Swing		

2016
Party	Candidate	Votes	%	±%
LDP	Hirofumi Nakasone (Incumbent) (endorsed by Komeito)	527,371	66.0	
Democratic	Hirohito Horikoshi (Endorsed by the JCP and the SDP)	248,615	31.1	
Happiness Realization	Akira Yasunaga	23,550	2.9	
Registered electors		1,650,035		
Majority		278,756	34.9	
Turnout		833,268	50.5	
LDP hold		Swing		

2013
Party	Candidate	Votes	%	±%
LDP	Ichita Yamamoto (Incumbent)	580,144	71.9	
Democratic	Fujiko Kagaya	123,725	15.3	
JCP	Setsuko Tenahashi	91,905	11.4	
Happiness Realization	Akira Yasunaga	11,200	1.4	
Registered electors		1,621,683		
Majority		456,419	56.6	
Turnout		839,221	51.8	
LDP hold		Swing		

2010
Party	Candidate	Votes	%	±%
LDP	Hirofumi Nakasone	558,659	60.6	▲30.3
Democratic	Yukio Tomioka (Incumbent)	287,934	31.2	▼3.3
JCP	Setsuko Tanahashi	75,792	8.2	+2.4
Registered electors		1,627,796		
Majority				
Turnout		953,075	58.6	▲
LDP gain from Democratic		Swing		
LDP loss (seat eliminated)				

=== Elections in the 2000s ===
2007
Party	Candidate	Votes	%	±%
LDP	Ichita Yamamoto (Incumbent) (Endorsed by Komeito)	530,114	62.0	
People's New	Koji Fukuda (Endorsed by the DPJ)	230,663	27.0	
JCP	Hiroaki Sakai	94,713	11.1	
Registered electors		1,627,803		
Majority		299,451	34.0	
Turnout		888,780	54.6	▼4.1
LDP hold		Swing		
Democratic loss (seat eliminated)				

2004
Party	Candidate	Votes	%	±%
Democratic	Yukio Tomioka	314,996	34.5	
LDP	Hirofumi Nakasone (Incumbent)	276,229	30.3	
LDP	Kosei Ueno	268,043	29.4	
JCP	Masaki Ogasawara	53,215	5.8	
Registered electors		1,620,993		
Turnout		940,176	58.0	▼2.7
Democratic gain from LDP		Swing		
LDP hold		Swing		

2001
Party	Candidate	Votes	%	±%
LDP	Ichita Yamamoto (Incumbent)	362,947	40.4	
Democratic	Giichi Tsunoda (Incumbent)	250,203	27.8	
LDP	Mayumi Yoshikawa	222,191	24.7	
JCP	Shinmei Ogasawara	45,647	5.1	
Liberal League	Haruyo Tsuchiya	18,467	1.9	
Registered electors		1,604,073		
Turnout		942,233	58.7	▲5.6
LDP hold		Swing		
Democratic gain from Socialist		Swing		

=== Elections in the 1990s ===
1998
Party	Candidate	Votes	%	±%
LDP	Hirofumi Nakasone (Incumbent)	303,032	33.7	
LDP	Kosei Ueno (Incumbent)	228,288	25.4	
Independent	Shio Yamazaki	173,672	19.3	
JCP	Yoshikazu Arima	136,957	15.2	
Liberal League	Yurikawa KiYA	56,595	6.3	
Registered electors		1,571,793		
Turnout		954,078	60.7	
LDP hold		Swing		
LDP hold		Swing		

1995
Party	Candidate	Votes	%	±%
LDP	Ichita Yamamoto	348,439	44.2	
Socialist	Giichi Tsunoda	214,713	27.3	
New Progressive Party (Japan)	Ichiro Abe	183,323	27.3	
JCP	Ryoichi Arima	41,236	5.2	
Registered electors		1,535,604		
Turnout		815,713	53.1	▼18.1
LDP gain from Socialist		Swing		
Socialist gain from LDP		Swing		

1992
Party	Candidate	Votes	%	±%
LDP	Hirofumi Nakasone	281,834	34.7	
LDP	Kosei Ueno	275,793	34.0	
Democratic Reform Party	Sukuro Akane	208,089	25.6	
JCP	Keigo Onodera	46,266	5.7	
Registered electors				
Majority				
LDP hold		Swing		
LDP hold		Swing		

=== Elections in the 1980s ===
1989
Party	Candidate	Votes	%	±%
Socialist	Giichi Tsunoda	442,897	44.9	
LDP	Ichita Yamamoto	240,152	24.4	
LDP	Susumu Mogami	130,281	13.2	
Independent	Minoru Komai	124,582	12.6	
JCP	Keigo Onodera	40,747	4.1	
Independent	Katsuo Uemura	3,797	0.4	
Kyoikutō	Michiki Umezawa	3,047	0.3	
Registered electors		1,418,891		
Turnout		1,010,676	71.2	▲3.5
Socialist gain from LDP		Swing		
LDP hold		Swing		

1986
Party	Candidate	Votes	%	±%
LDP	Hirofumi Nakasone	364,103	34.4	
LDP	Koichi Fukuda (Incumbent)	354,964	33.5	
Socialist	Giichi Tsunoda	302,159	28.6	
JCP	Kinnosuke Yoshimura	37,065	3.5	
Registered electors		1,367,045		
Turnout		1,098,284	80.3	▼0.6
LDP hold		Swing		
LDP gain from Socialist		Swing		

1983
Party	Candidate	Votes	%	±%
LDP	Ichita Yamamoto (Incumbent)	301,765	34.6	▼11.3
LDP	Susumu Mogami	269,477	30.9	▲6.7
Socialist	Giichi Tsunoda	259,896	29.8	▲4.7
JCP	Kinnosuke Yoshimura	40,707	4.7	
Registered electors		1,325,243		
Turnout		896,659	67.7	▼6.1
LDP hold		Swing		
LDP gain from Socialist		Swing		

1980
Party	Candidate	Votes	%	±%
LDP	Koichi Fukuda	456,665	45.9	N/A
Socialist	Yuzuru Yamada	249,943	25.1	
LDP	Susumu Mogami	241,171	24.2	N/A
JCP	Kinnosuke Yoshimura	47,829	4.8	▼3.6
Registered electors		1,280,446		
Turnout		1,035,497	80.9	▼0.7
LDP gain from Socialist		Swing		
Socialist gain from LDP		Swing		

=== Elections in the 1970s ===
1977
Party	Candidate	Votes	%	±%
LDP	Ichita Yamamoto	482,753	54.9	▲20.8
Socialist	Shigamitsu Akanegakubo	288,019	32.8	▼1.3
JCP	Shoji Sato	108,398	12.3	▲4.2
Registered electors		1,237,278		
Turnout		913,482	73.8	▲4.1
LDP gain from Socialist		Swing		
Socialist gain from LDP		Swing		

1974
Party	Candidate	Votes	%	±%
Socialist	Toshio Kurihara	299,386	31.7	New
LDP	Susumu Mogami	252,333	26.7	New
LDP	Ichiro Sada (Incumbent)	240,354	25.5	▼11.3
JCP	Shoji Sato	79,105	8.4	▲4.8
Kōmeitō	Akira Niiyama	72,967	7.7	New
Registered electors		1,183,622		
Turnout		965,954	81.6	▼0.7
Socialist gain from LDP		Swing		
LDP hold		Swing		

1971
Party	Candidate	Votes	%	±%
Socialist	Shigemitsu Akanegakubo	261,083	34.1	
LDP	Kunio Takahashi	203,113	26.5	
LDP	Eichiro Kondo	194,304	25.4	
JCP	Shoji Sato	61,753	8.1	
Independent	Takayuki Fukushima	45,359	5.9	
Turnout		1,130,126	69.7	−12.6

=== Elections in the 1960s ===
1968
Party	Candidate	Votes	%	±%
LDP	Ichiro Sata	306,309	36.8	
LDP	Shigesada Marumo	253,450	30.5	
Socialist	Shigemitsu Akanegakubo	242,230	29.1	
JCP	Tadao Miyazawa	30,037	3.6	
Turnout		1,044,537	82.3	+31.1

1967 by-election
Party	Candidate	Votes	%	±%
LDP	Ichiro Sata	291,042	56.3	
Socialist	Shigemitsu Akanegakubo	193,756	37.5	
JCP	Tadao Miyazawa	26,481	5.1	
Independent	Gen Takada	5,908	1.1	
Turnout			51.2	−21.5

1965
Party	Candidate	Votes	%	±%
Socialist	Yoichi Yamato	195,901	28.4	
LDP	Eichiro Kondo	189,517	27.5	
Independent	Kaneko Takeda	143,366	20.8	
	Hideko Mogami		17.6	
JCP	Tadao Miyasawa	23,107	3.4	
Independent	Rinkichi Hirayama	16,738	2.4	
Turnout		719,678	72.7	−0.1

1962
Party	Candidate	Votes	%	±%
LDP	Budayu Kogure	319,019	48.3	
Socialist	Akimichi Ito	188,920	28.6	
LDP	Kyohei Suzuki	95,464	14.5	
Democratic Socialist	Rinkichi Hirayama	31,601	4.8	
JCP	Akira Honjo	25,096	3.8	
Turnout		946,430	72.8	+2.1

=== Elections in the 1950s ===
1959
Party	Candidate	Votes	%	±%
Socialist	Yoichi Yamato	152,182	23.8	
LDP	Hideko Mogami	143,871	22.5	
LDP	Yoshio Ino	137,973	21.6	
Independent	June Saito	129,431	20.2	
Socialist	Unjuro Muto	62,447	9.8	
JCP	Akira Honjo	13,643	2.1	
Turnout		931,203	70.7	−3.7

1956
Party	Candidate	Votes	%	±%
LDP	Budayu Kogure	316,867	49.3	
Socialist	Kendo Ito	190,794	29.7	
Ryokufūkai	Renjiro Iijima	111,983	17.4	
JCP	Akira Honjo	22,648	3.5	
Turnout		898,828	74.4	−4.2

1953
Party	Candidate	Votes	%	±%
Liberal	Yoshio Iyoku	165,371	25.5	
Kaishintō	Hideko Mogami	135,649	20.9	
Left Socialist	Kinichi Umezu	98,284	15.1	
Independent	Ichiro Usuda	95,597	14.8	
Independent	Kojima Gunzo	60,059	9.3	
Independent	Kiyoo Sakaino	42,045	6.5	
Ryokufūkai	Masahiko Urano	40,375	6.2	
JCP	Akira Honjo	10,766	1.7	
Turnout		856,811	78.6	+16.9

1950
Party	Candidate	Votes	%	±%
Independent	Renjiro Iijima	143,180	22.0	
Democratic	Kyohei Suzuki	102,525	15.8	
Socialist	Shigemitsu Akanegakubo	97,487	15.0	
National Democratic	Hideko Mogami	96,874	14.9	
Liberal	Shintaro Matsuura	57,684	8.9	
National Democratic	Kogure Sanshiro	54,942	8.4	
National Democratic	Junichi Suzuki	48,220	7.4	
JCP	Kamitsu Endo	39,965	6.1	
Labourers and Farmers	Etsutaro Kurihara	9,725	1.5	
Turnout		1,127,914	61.7	+24.7

=== Elections in the 1940s ===
1947 By-election
Party	Candidate	Votes	%	±%
Democratic	Kiyoo Sakaino	177,792	59.3	
Socialist	Kiyomi Noma	104,244	34.8	
JCP	Kichitaro Yokemura	17,662	5.9	
Turnout			37.0	−31.9

1947
Party	Candidate	Votes	%	±%
Democratic	Takehoshi Tokuzo	109,032	20.9	
Socialist	Kinichi Umezu	93,033	17.8	
Democratic	Kihi Sanshiro	71,688	13.7	
Democratic	Junichi Suzuki	69,337	13.3	
Democratic	Kiyoo Sakaino	66,573	12.8	
Democratic	Shiro Kurita	32,783	6.3	
Independent	Seigo Motegi	22,067	4.2	
Independent	Matsudaira Shunosuke	16,722	3.2	
JCP	Kichitaro Yokemura	16,293	3.1	
Liberal	Hayashi Yoshige	15,198	2.9	
Independent	Taketaro Ikebu	6,459	1.2	
Independent	Araki Tokisugu	2,884	0.6	
Turnout		823,481	68.9	N/A
