= Hideko Mogami =

Japanese politician (1902–1966)

- 最上 英子
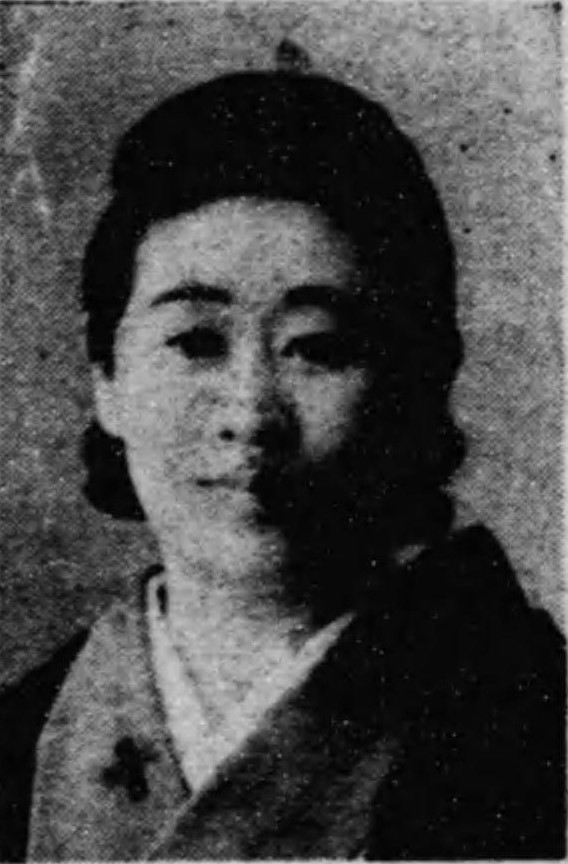
- Mogami in 1948

Vice-Minister of Posts and Telecommunications
- In office 10 July 1957 – 12 June 1958
- Prime Minister: Nobusuke Kishi

Member of the House of Councillors
- In office 24 April 1953 – 1 June 1965
- Preceded by: Kiyoo Sakaino
- Succeeded by: Eiichirō Kondō
- Constituency: Gunma at-large

Member of the House of Representatives
- In office 10 April 1946 – 23 December 1948
- Preceded by: Constituency established
- Succeeded by: Mitsuhei Obuchi
- Constituency: Gunma at-large (1946–1947); Gunma 3rd (1947–1948)

Personal details
- Born: 19 December 1902 Haruna, Gunma, Japan
- Died: 16 October 1966 (aged 63)
- Party: Liberal Democratic (1955–1966)
- Other political affiliations: JPP (1945–1947); DP (1947–1950); NDP (1950–1952); Kaishintō (1952–1954); JDP (1954–1955)
- Spouse: Masazo Mogami (m. 1920)
- Education: Tokyo Women's University

Hideko Mogami (Japanese: 最上英子; 9 December 1902 – 16 October 1966) was a Japanese politician. She was one of the first group of women elected to the House of Representatives in 1946, and remained a member until 1949. She later served in the House of Councillors from 1953 to 1965 and as Deputy Secretary of State for Postal Affairs in 1957–1958.

== Early life and education ==
Mogami was born in Haruna in 1902. She studied literature at Tokyo Women's University, and married Masazo Mogami, a reporter for Yorozu Choho. He was elected to parliament in 1930 for the Constitutional Democratic Party. However, after World War II he was banned from politics.

== Political career ==
Mogami contested the 1946 general elections (the first in which women could vote) as a Japan Progressive Party candidate, and was elected to the House of Representatives. She was re-elected in 1947 as a Democratic Party candidate, but lost her seat in the 1949 elections. She subsequently stood for election to the House of Councillors in 1950. Although she was unsuccessful, she ran again in 1953 as a Kaishintō candidate and was elected. The party merged into the Democratic Party in 1954 and then the Liberal Democratic Party the following year. From October 1957 to June 1958 she served as Deputy Secretary of State for Postal Affairs. She was re-elected in 1959, serving until 1965. She died the following year. Her nephew Susumu, who she adopted in 1963, later also served in the House of Councillors.
