= Gunma At-large district =

Gunma At-large district may refer to:

- Gunma At-large district (House of Councillors), a current electoral district for the House of Councillors in the Diet of Japan
- Gunma At-large district (House of Representatives), a former electoral district for the House of Representatives in the Imperial Diet of Japan
