= Kokumin Minshutō =

Kokumin Minshutō (国民民主党) may refer to:

- National Democratic Party (Japan), 1950-1952
- Democratic Party for the People, 2018-
