= Japan Farmers Party =

Japan Farmers Party (Japanese: 日本農民党, Nihon Nōmintō) may refer to:

- Japan Farmers Party (1926–28)
- Japan Farmers Party (1947–49)
