= Kokumintō =

Kokumintō (Japanese: 国民党, lit. National Party) may refer to:

- National Party (Japan), a defunct political party whose Japanese name was Kokumintō
- Rikken Kokumintō, a defunct political party in Japan also known as Kokumintō
