= Ichita Yamamoto =

Japanese politician (born 1958)

- 山本一太
- Official portrait, 2025

Governor of Gunma Prefecture
- Incumbent
- Assumed office 28 July 2019
- Monarch: Naruhito
- Preceded by: Masaaki Ōsawa

Member of the House of Councillors
- In office 27 July 1995 – 4 July 2019
- Preceded by: Tomio Yamamoto
- Succeeded by: Masato Shimizu
- Constituency: Gunma at-large

Personal details
- Born: 24 January 1958 (age 68) Kusatsu, Gunma, Japan
- Party: Independent (since 2019)
- Other political affiliations: LDP (1995–2019)
- Education: Chuo University; Georgetown University

Ichita Yamamoto (山本 一太, Yamamoto Ichita; born 24 January 1958 in Kusatsu, Gunma) is a Japanese politician who has been the governor of Gunma Prefecture since July 2019. He was a neoconservative member of the House of Councillors in Japan. A member of the Liberal Democratic Party, he served as the Minister of State for Okinawa and Northern Territories Affairs from 2012 to 2019 on the second Abe cabinet.

== Career ==
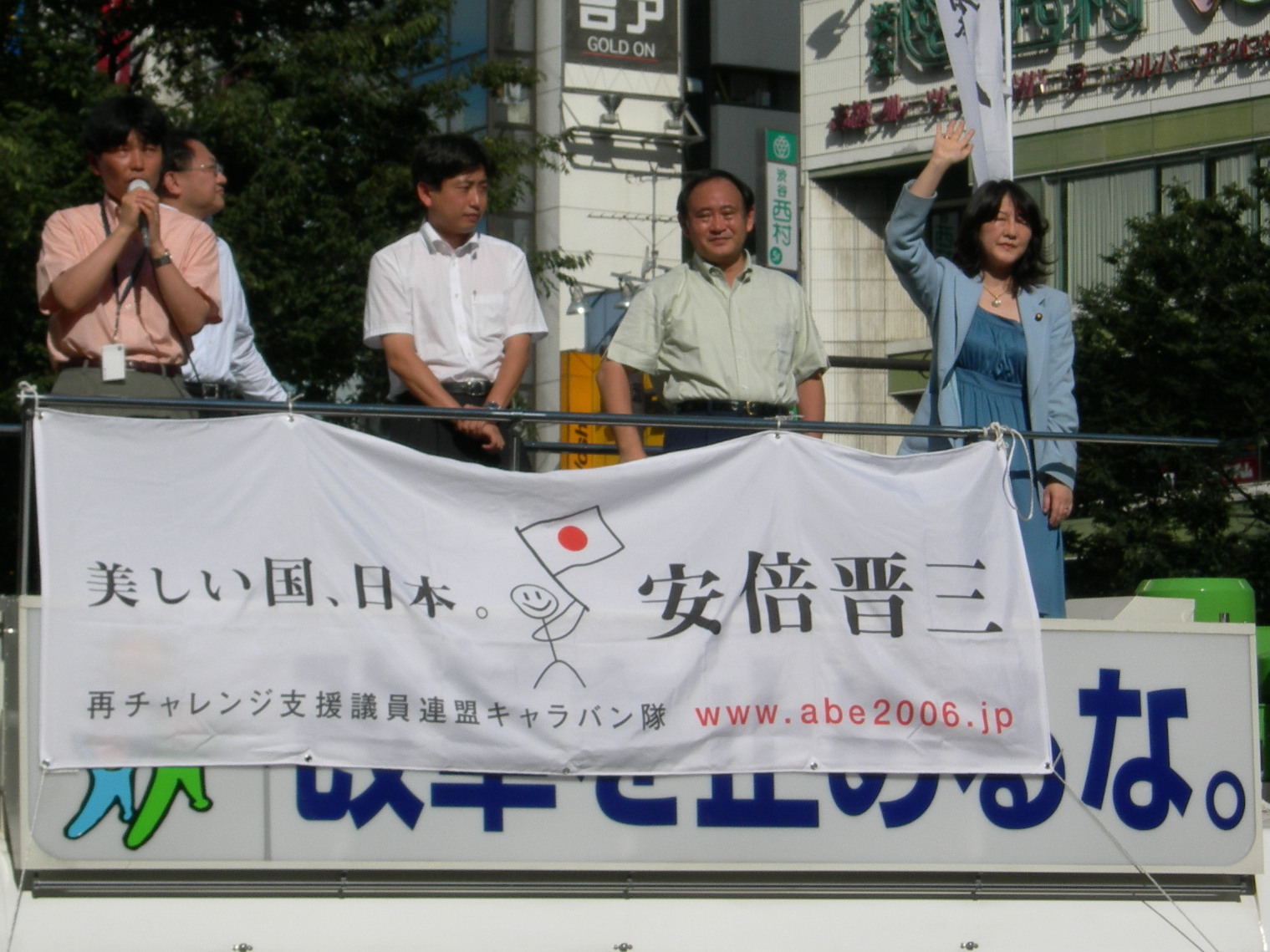
Yamamoto with Yoshihide Suga and Satsuki Katayama (September 19, 2006)

Yamamoto who worked for an international organisation was elected after the death of his father Tomio Yamamoto who was a member of the House of Councillors. Ichita Yamamoto's great-grandfather founded the Kusatsu ryokan "Yamadaya". Ichita's grandfather was mayor of Kusatsu. Ichita's father, Tomio Yamamoto, started in the Kusatsu town council (1955), rose to the Gunma Prefectural Assembly (1966), and finally the House of Councillors (1977), where he remained until his death in 1995 (age 66) of liver failure. Ichita Yamamoto belongs to some committees including the Foreign and Defense Policy Committee.

Ichita Yamamoto hails from the skiing and hot spring resort town of Kusatsu in Gunma Prefecture. His family owned the Hotel White Town in Kusatsu. (This hotel went bankrupt in 1989.) Tomio Yamamoto (his father) was a coach of the Japanese Olympic ski team. Yamamoto obtained his LL.B. from Chuo University. After that, he studied English at Simul Academy and Nichibei Kaiwa Gakuin. Yamamoto then entered the Master of Science in Foreign Service program at Georgetown University, graduating in 1986. Upon returning to Japan, he worked for Asahi Newspaper as a reporter for a short period of time, at the Fukushima bureau. After Asahi, Yamamoto worked for the Japanese government development aid organization JICA for a number of years, later transferring to the United Nations in New York. Upon the death of his father, he ran for the same seat and won in 1995. He was re-elected in 2001, 2007 and 2013. Yamamoto frequently appears on political talk shows in Japan.

On 26 December 2012, Yamamoto was named Minister of State for Okinawa and Northern Territories Affairs in the second Cabinet of Prime Minister Shinzo Abe.

== Music ==
- Misekake no Democracy (見せかけのデモクラシー, Fake Democracy), 1998
- Kaikaku no Uta (かいかくの詩, Song for Reform), 2003, Featured on episode 7 of Adam and Joe Go Tokyo.

House of Councillors
Preceded by Giichi Tsunoda; Tomio Yamamoto	Councillor for Gunma's at-large district 1995–2019; Served alongside: Giichi Tsunoda	Succeeded by Masato Shimizu
