= Hirofumi Nakasone =

Japanese politician (born 1945)

- 中曽根 弘文
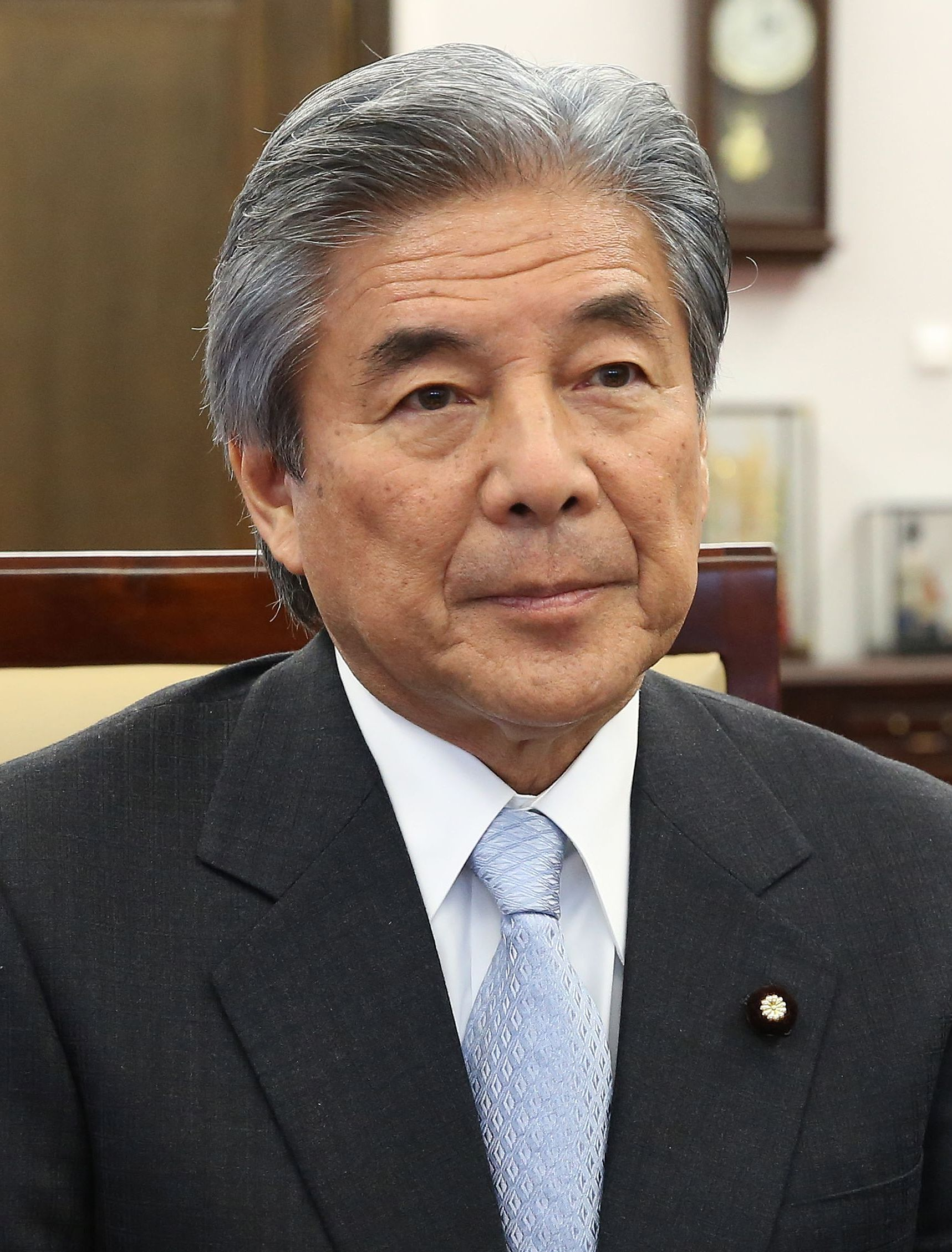
- Nakasone in 2015

Minister for Foreign Affairs
- In office 24 September 2008 – 16 September 2009
- Prime Minister: Tarō Asō
- Preceded by: Masahiko Kōmura
- Succeeded by: Katsuya Okada

Minister of Education Director of the Science and Technology Agency
- In office 5 October 1999 – July 2000
- Prime Minister: Keizō Obuchi; Yoshirō Mori
- Preceded by: Akito Arima
- Succeeded by: Tadamori Ōshima

Member of the House of Councillors
- Incumbent
- Assumed office 8 July 1986
- Preceded by: Hiroichi Fukuda
- Constituency: Gunma at-large

Personal details
- Born: 28 November 1945 (age 80) Takasaki, Gunma Prefecture, Japan
- Party: Liberal Democratic
- Spouse: Mariko Nakasone
- Children: Yasutaka Nakasone; Fumiko Nakasone
- Parent(s): Yasuhiro Nakasone; Tsutako Kobayashi
- Relatives: Ichiro Kawanabe (son-in-law); Tomomi Sato (daughter-in-law)
- Education: Keio University

Hirofumi Nakasone (中曽根 弘文, Nakasone Hirofumi; born 28 November 1945) is a Japanese politician who served as a Minister for Foreign Affairs from September 2008 to September 2009. A member of Liberal Democratic Party, he also served as a Minister of Education under Prime Ministers Keizō Obuchi and Yoshirō Mori. He is the son of former Prime Minister Yasuhiro Nakasone.

== Biography ==
Nakasone was born in Gunma Prefecture on 28 November 1945 and graduated from Keio University with a degree in Business and Commerce.

After graduation, he worked at Asahi Kasei and then became secretary to his father, Prime Minister Yasuhiro Nakasone, in 1983.

Nakasone has been a member of the House of Councillors since being elected in 1986.

Nakasone was appointed as Minister of Education and director general of the Science and Technology Agency by Prime Minister Keizō Obuchi in early October 1999. In the Cabinet of Prime Minister Tarō Asō, appointed on 24 September 2008, Nakasone was appointed as Minister of Foreign Affairs.

In April 2024, he was appointed chairman of the LDP Foreign Policy Research Committee.

Nakasone headed Sanae Takaichi's successful campaign for the LDP presidency in 2025. After her election, Takaichi appointed him head of the LDP headquarters for realizing constitutional revision.

== Political views ==
Nakasone is affiliated to the conservative organization Nippon Kaigi. In 2016, Nakasone chaired a commission established to consider "concrete measures to restore Japan's honor with regard to the comfort women issue."

== Honors ==
- Mexico - Bands of the Order of the Aztec Eagle

Political offices
Preceded by Masahiko Kōmura	Minister for Foreign Affairs; 2008–2009	Succeeded by Katsuya Okada
Preceded by Akito Arima	Minister of Education; Director-General of the Science and Technology Agency; 1999–2000	Succeeded by Tadamori Ōshima
Party political offices
Preceded by Hidehisa Otsuji	Chairman of the Liberal Democratic Party in the House of Councillors; 2010–2013	Succeeded by Kensei Mizote
House of Councillors
Preceded by Hiroichi Fukuda; Yuzuru Yamada	Councillor for Gunma's at-large district 1986– Served alongside: Hiroichi Fukuda, Kōsei Ueno, Yukio Tomioka	Incumbent
