= Masaaki Ōsawa =

Japanese politician

- 大澤 正明
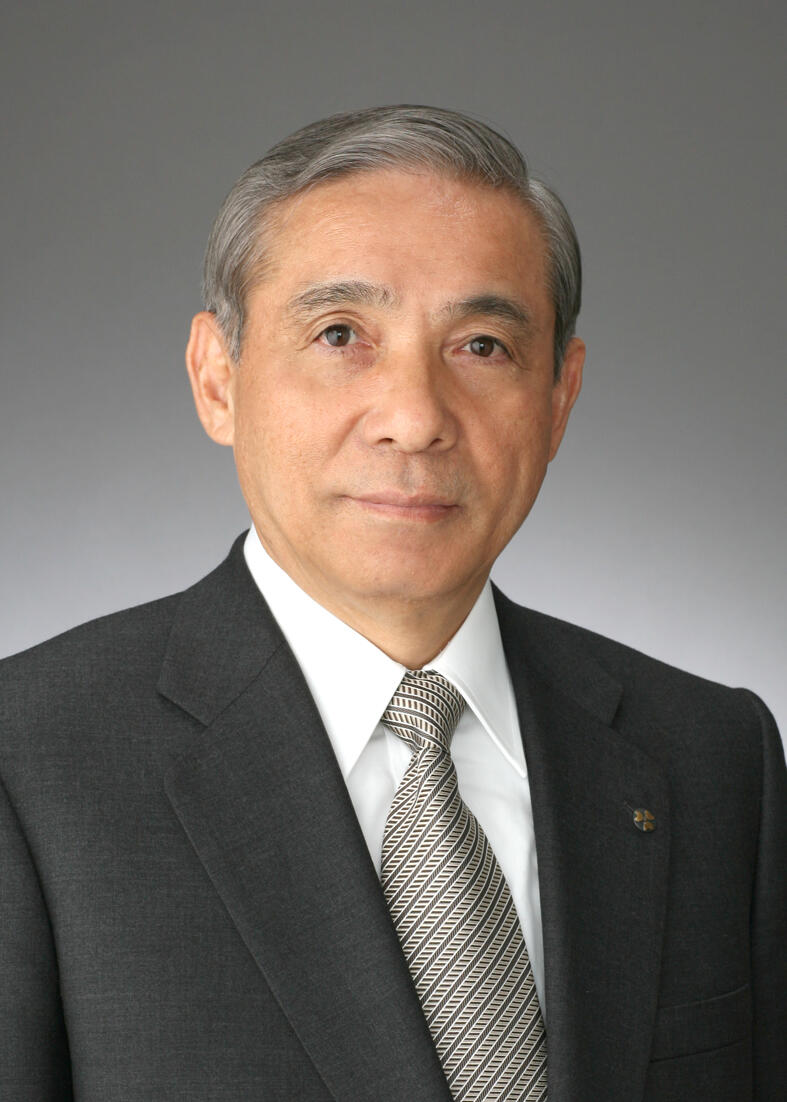

Governor of Gunma Prefecture
- In office 28 July 2007 – 27 July 2019
- Monarchs: Akihito; Naruhito
- Preceded by: Hiroyuki Kodera
- Succeeded by: Ichita Yamamoto

Speaker of the Gunma Prefectural Assembly
- In office 30 May 2006 – 29 April 2007
- Preceded by: Norio Nakamura
- Succeeded by: Jōichi Nakazawa

Member of the Gunma Prefectural Assembly
- In office 30 April 1991 – 29 April 2007
- Constituency: Nitta District

Member of the Ojima Town Council
- In office 1983–1991

Personal details
- Born: 21 January 1946 (age 80) Ojima, Gunma, Japan
- Party: Liberal Democratic
- Education: Keio University

Masaaki Ōsawa (大沢 正明, Ōsawa Masaaki; born 21 January 1946) was the governor of Gunma Prefecture in Japan. He was first elected in 2007 after serving in the assembly of Gunma Prefecture.
