= Masato Shimizu =

Japanese politician (born 1975)

- 清水 真人
- Official portrait, 2020

Member of the House of Councillors
- Incumbent
- Assumed office 29 July 2019
- Preceded by: Ichita Yamamoto
- Constituency: Gunma at-large

Member of the Gunma Prefectural Assembly
- In office 2011–2019
- Constituency: Takasaki City

Member of the Takasaki City Council
- In office 2003–2011

Personal details
- Born: 26 February 1975 (age 51) Takasaki, Gunma, Japan
- Party: Liberal Democratic
- Education: Meiji Gakuin University

Masato Shimizu (清水 真人, Shimizu Masato; born 26 February 1975) is a Japanese politician belonging to the Nikai Faction of the Liberal Democratic Party (LDP), serving his first term in the House of Councillors, representing Gumma Prefecture.

== Early life and education ==
Shimizu is from the city of Takasaki in Gumma Prefecture. He graduated from the Tokyo University of Agriculture Second High School, located in Takasaki. He then attended Meiji Gakuin University in Tokyo. After graduating with a degree in economics, he worked in a number of social welfare service corporations, first as a trustee or councillor, then as a director, before beginning his political career.

== Political career ==
In 2008, at the age of 28, he ran for office as a member of the Takasaki city council, serving 2 consecutive terms (2003–2011). He then was elected as a prefectural assembly member for 2 consecutive terms (2011–2019).

In the 25th regular election of members of the House of Councillors held on 21 July 2019, he defeated Atsuko Saito, a candidate of the Constitutional Democratic Party of Japan, and other opposition party candidates, to become a member of the House of Councillors. After winning the election, be joined the Nikai faction, a faction within the LDP led by Toshihiro Nikai.

== Political views ==
- Favors amending the Constitution of Japan.
- Criticizes Abenomics.
- Favored the October 2019 increase in consumption tax to 10%.
- Has stated that the government's response to the problem of falsifying public documents relating to the Moritomo Gakuen scandals has been inadequate.

== Affiliations ==
Shimizu is a member of the Conference to Japan's Dignity and National Interest (Nihon no Songen to Kokueki o Mamoru Kai).

== Sources ==
This article is largely translated from the Japanese Wikipedia article.
