= Yukio Tomioka =

Japanese politician

- 富岡 由紀夫
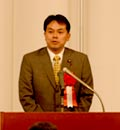
- Tomioka in 2006

Member of the House of Councillors
- In office 26 July 2004 – 25 July 2010
- Preceded by: Kōsei Ueno
- Succeeded by: Seat abolished
- Constituency: Gunma at-large

Personal details
- Born: 3 April 1964 (age 62) Kawaguchi, Saitama, Japan
- Party: Democratic (2003–2012)
- Other political affiliations: Your Party (2012–2014)
- Relatives: Yoshitada Tomioka (brother)
- Education: Waseda University

Yukio Tomioka (富岡 由紀夫, Tomioka Yukio; born April 3, 1964) is a Japanese politician of the Democratic Party of Japan, a former member of the House of Councillors in the Diet (national legislature). A native of Kawaguchi, Saitama and graduate of Waseda University, he worked at the Fuji Bank (now part of Mizuho Financial Group) from 1987 until 2003 when he ran unsuccessfully for the House of Representatives. In 2004, he was elected to the House of Councillors for the first time.

House of Councillors
Preceded by Hirofumi Nakasone; Kosei Ueno	Councillor for Gunma's At-large district 2004–2010; Served alongside: Hirofumi Nakasone	Succeeded by Hirofumi Nakasone
