= Giichi Tsunoda =

Japanese lawyer and politician (1937–2024)

- 角田 義一
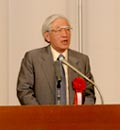
- Tsunoda in 2006

Vice President of the House of Councillors
- In office 30 July 2004 – 30 January 2007
- President: Chikage Oogi
- Preceded by: Shōji Motooka
- Succeeded by: Akira Imaizumi

Member of the House of Councillors
- In office 23 July 1989 – 28 July 2007
- Preceded by: Susumu Mogami
- Succeeded by: Seat abolished
- Constituency: Gunma at-large

Member of the Gunma Prefectural Assembly
- In office 1973–1983

Personal details
- Born: 9 June 1937 Akagi, Gunma, Japan
- Died: 23 February 2024 (aged 86) Maebashi, Gunma, Japan
- Party: Democratic (1998–2016)
- Other political affiliations: JSP (1973–1996); SDP (1996–1997); DP 1996 (1997–1998); DP 2016 (2016–2018); CDP (2018–2024)
- Education: Kyoto University
- Occupation: Lawyer

Giichi Tsunoda (Japanese: 角田義一; Tsunoda Giichi; 9 June 1937 – 23 February 2024) was a Japanese lawyer and politician. A member of the Japan Socialist Party and the Democratic Party, he served in the House of Councillors from 1989 to 2007.

Tsunoda died in Maebashi on 23 February 2024, at the age of 86.
