= 1947 Japanese House of Councillors election =

- 20 April 1947

250 seats in the House of Councillors 126 seats needed for a majority
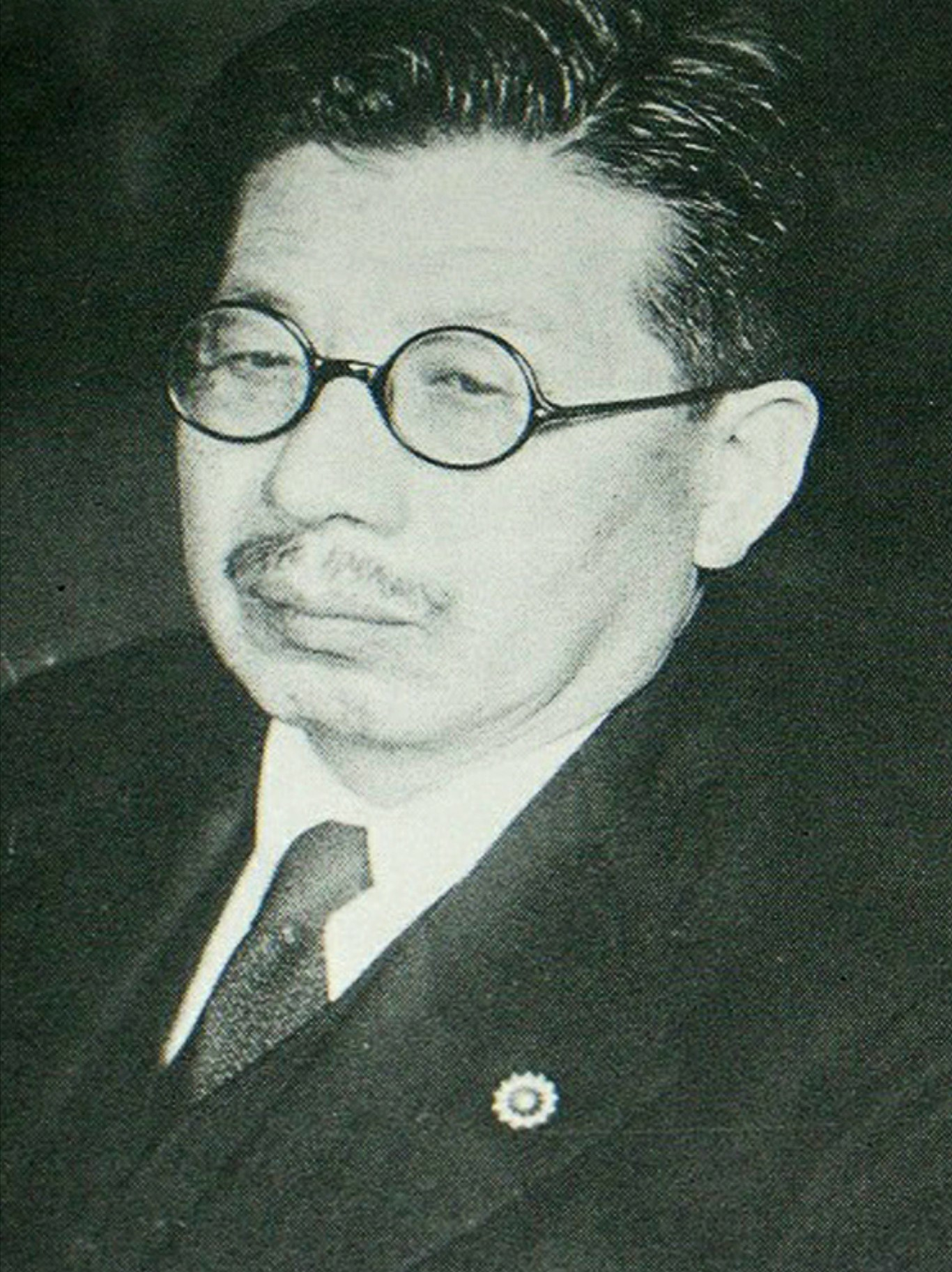

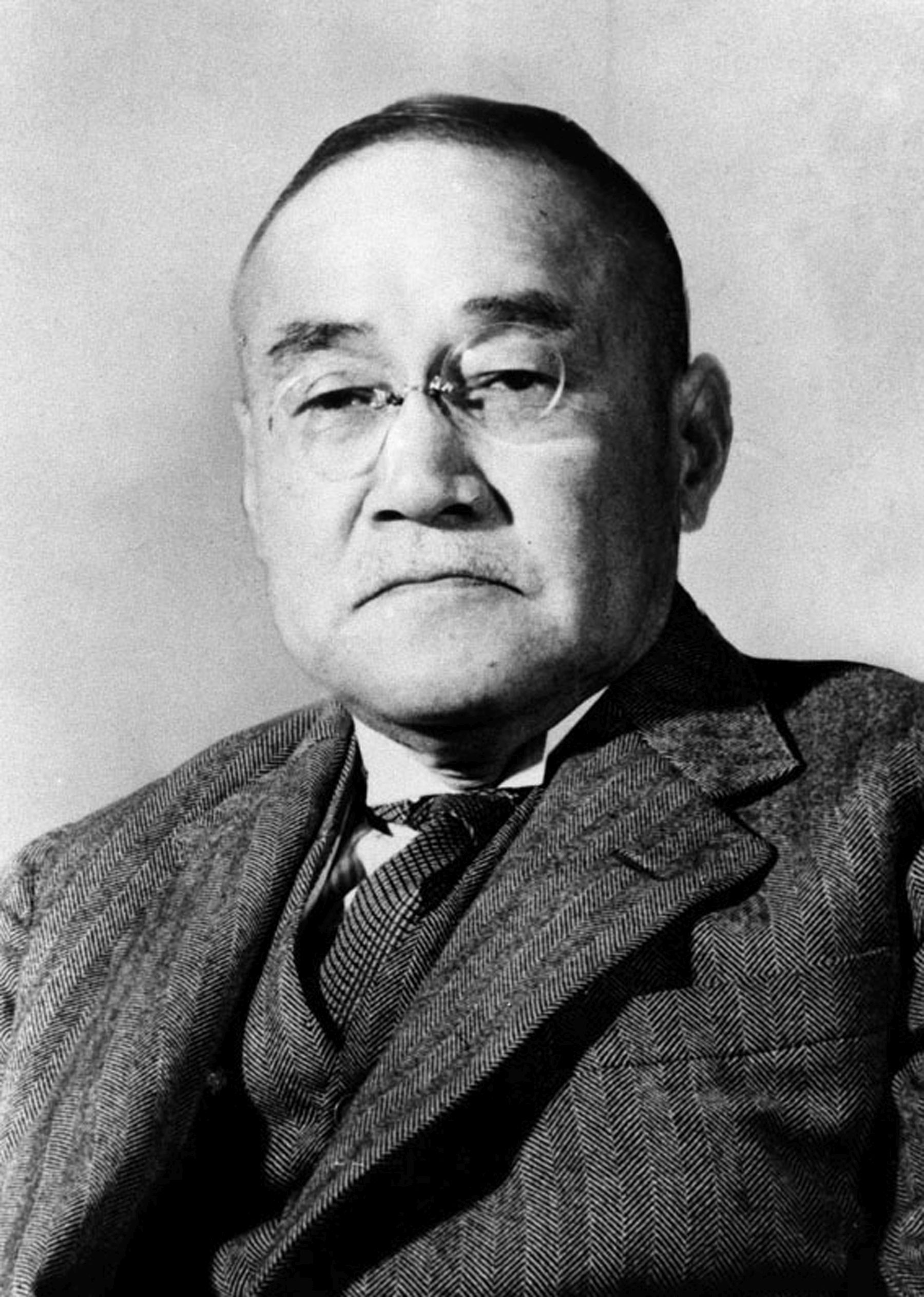

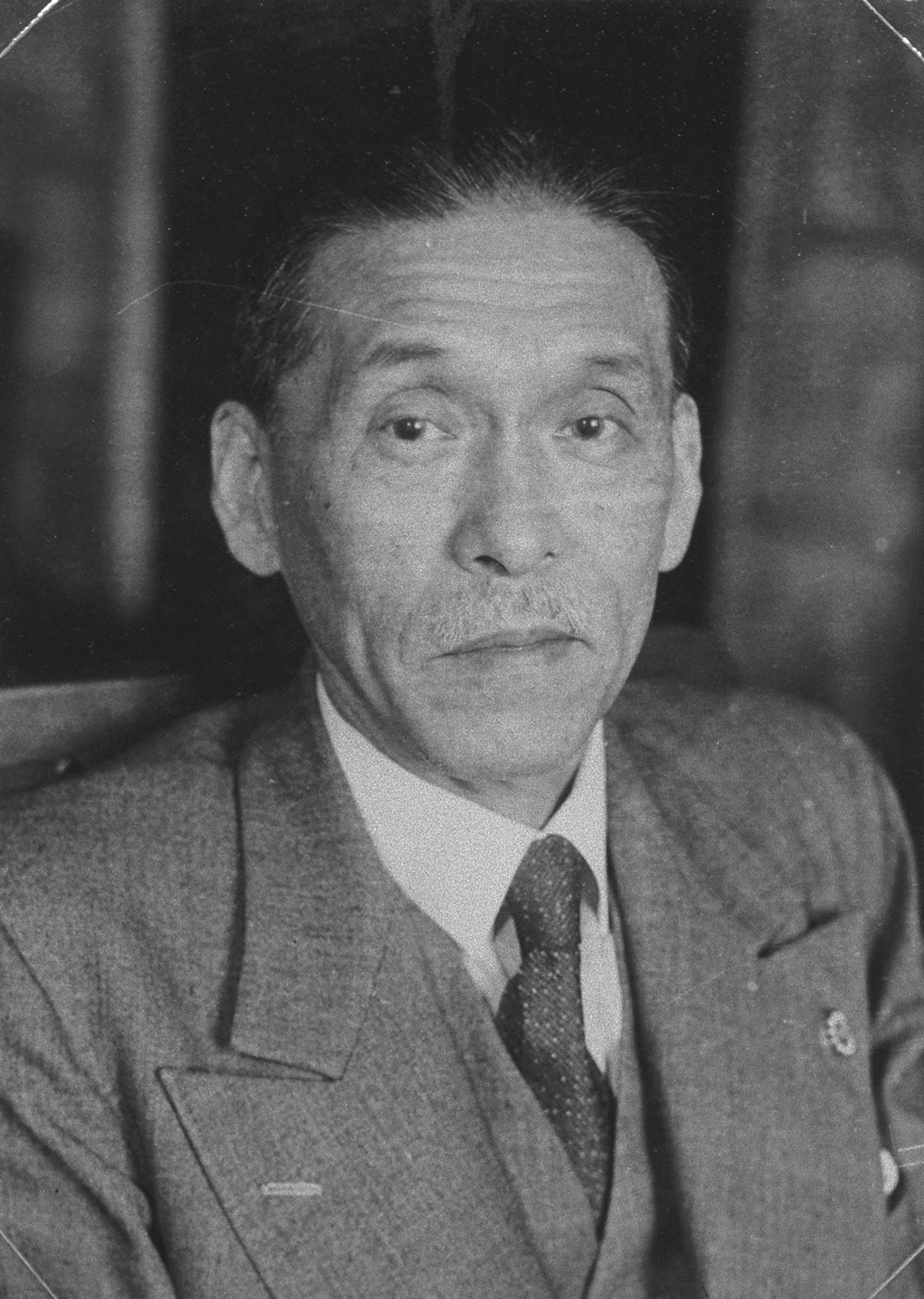

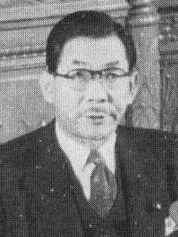

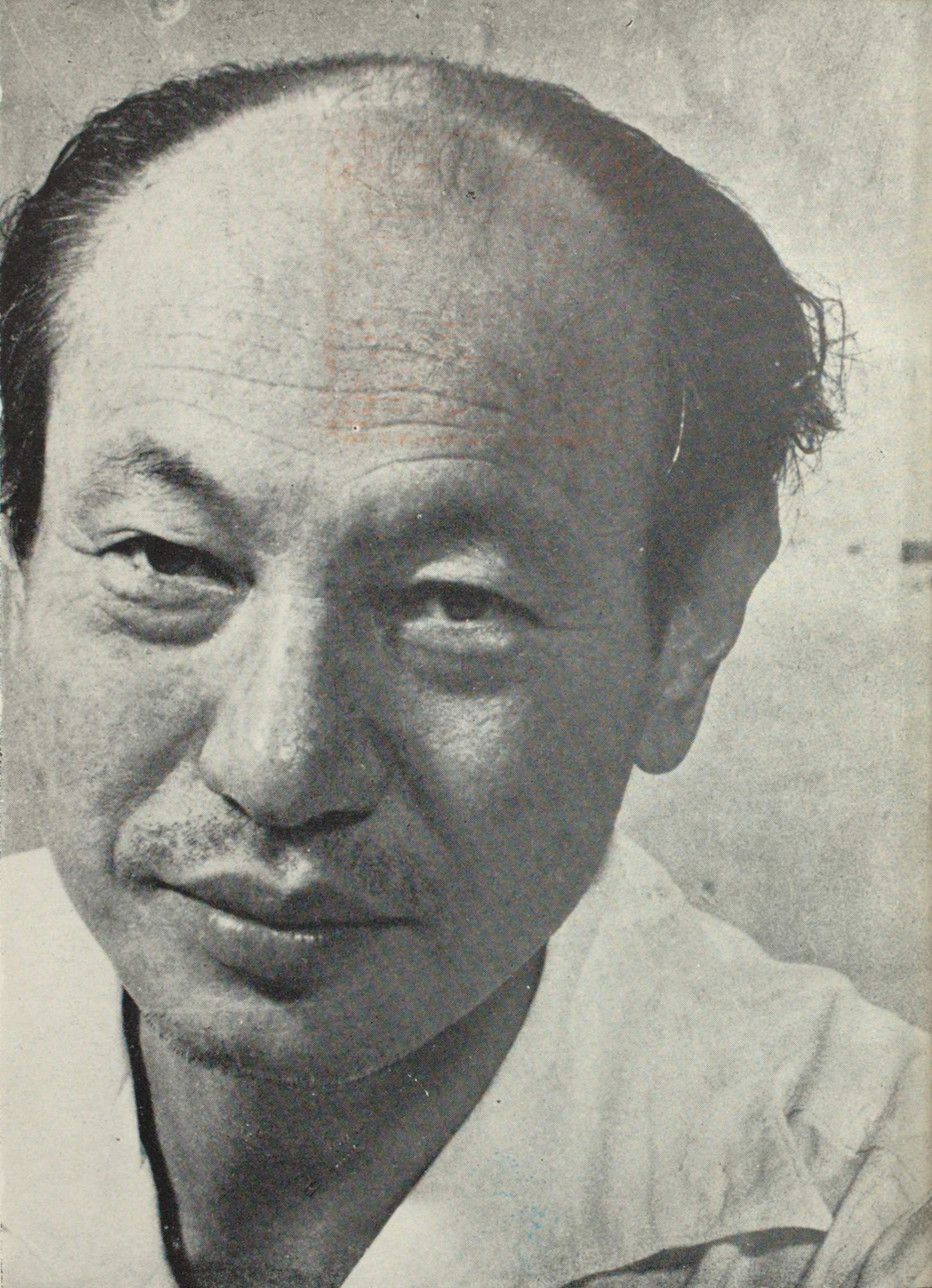
	First party	Second party	Third party
Leader	Tetsu Katayama	Shigeru Yoshida	Hitoshi Ashida
Party	Socialist	Liberal	Democratic
Seats won	47	38	28
Popular vote	3,479,814	1,360,456	1,508,087
Percentage	16.36%	6.40%	7.09%
	Fourth party	Fifth party
Leader	Takeo Miki	Kyuichi Tokuda
Party	National Cooperative	JCP
Seats won	9	4
Popular vote	549,916	610,948
Percentage	2.59%	2.87%
- Results of the election, showing the winning candidates in each prefecture and the national block.

House of Councillors elections were held in Japan on 20 April 1947. The Japan Socialist Party won more seats than any other party, although independents emerged as the largest group in the House. Most independents joined the Ryokufūkai parliamentary group in the first Diet session making it the largest group, and Ryokufūkai member Tsuneo Matsudaira was elected the first president of the House of Councillors.

== Results ==
Party	National			Constituency			Total seats
Party	Votes	%	Seats	Votes	%	Seats	Total seats
Japan Socialist Party	3,479,814	16.36	17	4,901,341	22.23	30	47
Democratic Party	1,508,087	7.09	6	2,989,132	13.56	22	28
Liberal Party	1,360,456	6.40	8	3,769,704	17.10	30	38
Japanese Communist Party	610,948	2.87	3	825,304	3.74	1	4
National Cooperative Party	549,916	2.59	3	978,522	4.44	6	9
Other parties	1,063,253	5.00	6	1,058,032	4.80	7	13
Independents	12,698,698	59.70	57	7,527,191	34.14	54	111
Total	21,271,172	100.00	100	22,049,226	100.00	150	250
Valid votes	21,271,172	85.24		22,049,226	89.83		
Invalid/blank votes	3,684,218	14.76		2,497,308	10.17		
Total votes	24,955,390	100.00		24,546,534	100.00		
Registered voters/turnout	40,958,588	60.93		40,164,180	61.12		
Source: Ministry of Internal Affairs and Communications

=== By constituency ===
Prefecture	Total seats	Seats won						
Prefecture	Total seats	JSP	LP	DP	NCP	JCP	Others	Ind.
Aichi	6		2					4
Akita	2		1					1
Aomori	2			1				1
Chiba	4		1	1				2
Ehime	2	1					1	
Fukui	2	1						1
Fukuoka	6	3	1	1				1
Fukushima	4	1		1			1	1
Gifu	2	1						1
Gunma	4	1		3				
Hiroshima	4	1						3
Hokkaido	8	2	1					5
Hyōgo	6	1		2			2	1
Ibaraki	4	1	1					2
Ishikawa	2		1	1				
Iwate	2							2
Kagawa	2		1		1			
Kagoshima	4							4
Kanagawa	4	1	2		1			
Kōchi	2		1	1				
Kumamoto	4	1	1	2				
Kyoto	4	1	2					1
Mie	2						1	1
Miyagi	2	1		1				
Miyazaki	2	1						1
Nagano	4	1	1	1	1			
Nagasaki	2	1						1
Nara	2				1			1
Niigata	4	1	1					2
Ōita	2		1		1			
Okayama	4	1	1			1		1
Osaka	6	2	2	2				
Saga	2		1	1				
Saitama	4	1	2	1				
Shiga	2							2
Shimane	2							2
Shizuoka	4		2					2
Tochigi	4	1		2				1
Tokushima	2						1	1
Tokyo	8	2	3	1				2
Tottori	2						2	
Toyama	2		1		1			
Wakayama	2							2
Yamagata	2							2
Yamaguchi	2		1					1
Yamanashi	2	1						1
National	100	16	8	6	3	3	6	58
Total	250	45	39	28	9	4	14	111
