= Gunma at-large district (House of Representatives) =

Legislative district of Japan

Gunma At-large district was a constituency of the House of Representatives in the Diet of Japan (national legislature) in the election of 1946. It consisted of the entire prefecture of Gunma and elected ten Representatives by limited voting with two votes.

== Election Result ==
1946
Party	Candidate	Votes	%	±%
Independent	Shinakichi Nomoto	127,007		
JPP	Hideko Mogami	71,419		
JPP	Yūji Iijima	69,870		
JSP	Kō Sunaga	67,871		
JPP	Kyōhei Suzuki	62,432		
JPP	Goroku Yamada	47,787		
JSP	Saburō Machida	46,287		
JSP	Unjūrō Mutō	42,955		
JPP	Hamakichi Takizawa	40,793		
JLP	Ryūta Komine	36,700		
JPP	Daikichi Ubukata	36,459		
JSP	Yoshiharu Ōshima	35,079		
Others	Toyokichi Matsuo	29,607		
Independent	Sanshirō Kogure	26,651		
JPP	Kinnosuke Mutō	26,414		
JSP	Tadasuke Kuwajima	25,187		
Independent	Seizō Noma	18,028		
Independent	Keisuke Ōyama	17,330		
JLP	Tadashi Koike	17,287		
JCP	Shōjirō Yamada	17,151		
JSP	Yoneichi Tatsumi	16,754		
JSP	Takashi Hoshino	16,676		
Others	Kichinosuke Iijima	15,306		
	31 other candidates with <15,000 votes	183,356		
