= Japan Cooperative Party (1945–46) =

Defunct political party in post-war Japan

Japan Cooperative Party 日本協同党 Nihon Kyōdōtō
- Chairperson: Yamamoto Sanehiko
- Founded: 18 December 1945
- Dissolved: 24 May 1946
- Merged into: Cooperative Democratic Party
- Ideology: Cooperative unionism
- Political position: Centre to centre-right

The Japan Cooperative Party (日本協同党, Nihon Kyōdōtō) was a centrist to centre-right political party in Japan.

== History ==
On 18 December 1945, the Japan Cooperative Party was founded by Kōtarō Sengoku with the cooperation of Torizō Kurosawa Before the war, Sengoku was a leader of the industrial cooperatives, and after the war, he served as Minister of Agriculture and Commerce in the Higashikuni cabinet. Kurosawa was a leader of a dairy cooperative and was known as the "Butter King" of Hokkaido. Katsutarō Kita, an agriculturalist who previously served as a prefectural director of the nōkai, has been appointed as the party's vice chairperson. It initially had around 20 members.

On 4 January 1946, the Supreme Commander for the Allied Powers (SCAP) published a memorandum pertaining to the Purge (from public office) based on the Potsdam Declaration and an order from the State-War-Navy Coordinating Committee (SWNCC). Only two of the party's 23 legislative members were able to escape the Purge. In the April 1946 elections, the party fielded 94 candidates, however won only 14 seats. Nine of the election winners were executives or former leaders of agricultural and fisheries organizations, or both, highlighting the party's strong agricultural affiliation. On the other hand, the dominant Liberal Party could not win an absolute majority, so the Shidehara Cabinet did not resign and began maneuvering to cling to power. In response, the party supported a movement for the campaign to oust the cabinet advocated by the Socialist Party, and formed a four-party joint committee of the Japan Cooperative Party, the Socialist Party, the Liberal Party, and the Communist Party. The four-party joint committee started negotiations for a coalition government after defeating the cabinet, but the idea eventually failed due to disagreements within the subcommittee. In May, it merged with several smaller parties to form the Cooperative Democratic Club, later renamed the Cooperative Democratic Party.

== Ideology and policies ==
The Japan Cooperative Party was an political party that represented the philosophy of cooperative unionism (kyōdō kumiai shugi), and one of its central policies was the ideal of labor-management cooperation. One of the party's organizational principles was to "use agricultural organizations to influence elections," attempting to combine the spirit of cooperative unionism with the interests of the agriculture and business. In January 1946, the party proposed replacing the compulsory rice delivery system, which the Ministry of Agriculture and Forestry (MAF) had introduced in December 1945, with a voluntary system. Furthermore, in the first post-war election, the party pledged to demand a price of over 500 yen per 150 kilograms of rice, and won many votes from farmers.

The party adhered to cooperative ideology, had an agricultural orientation, and formed the mainstream of the cooperative movement in Japanese politics. Ultimately, the party's cooperative movement tradition weakened and flowed into the National Democratic Party, the Reformist Party, and eventually the Japan Democratic Party.

== Election results ==
=== House of Representatives ===
Election	Leader	Votes	%	Seats	Position	Status
1946	Sanehiko Yamamoto	1,799,764	3.25	14 / 468	5th	Opposition
