= 1950 Japanese House of Councillors election =

- 4 June 1950

132 of the 250 seats in the House of Councillors 126 seats needed for a majority
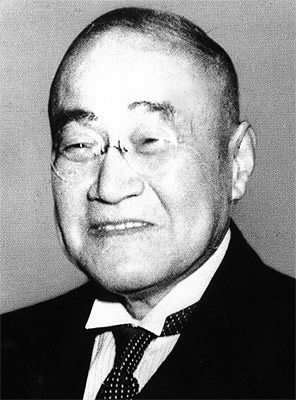

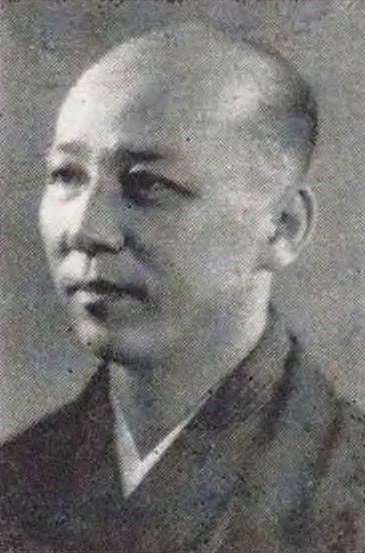

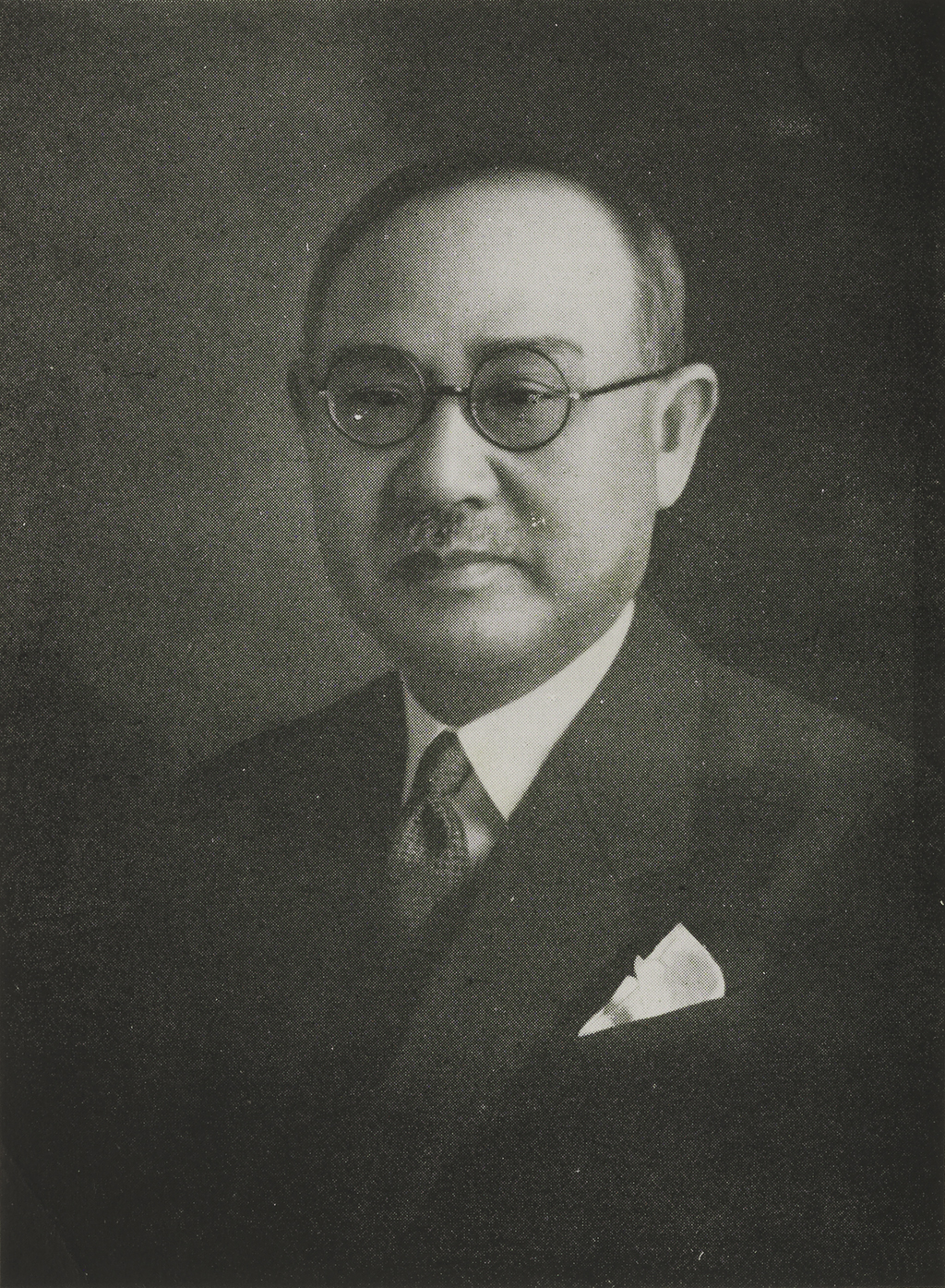

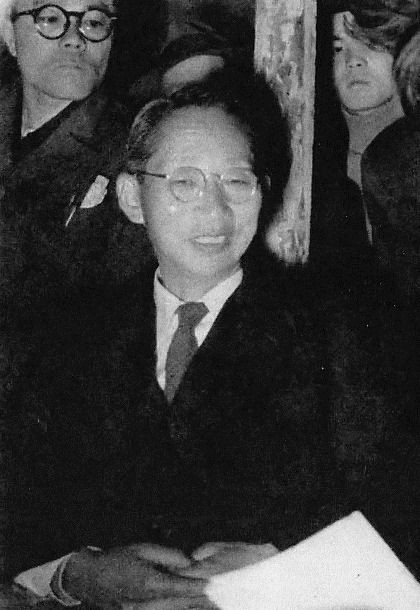

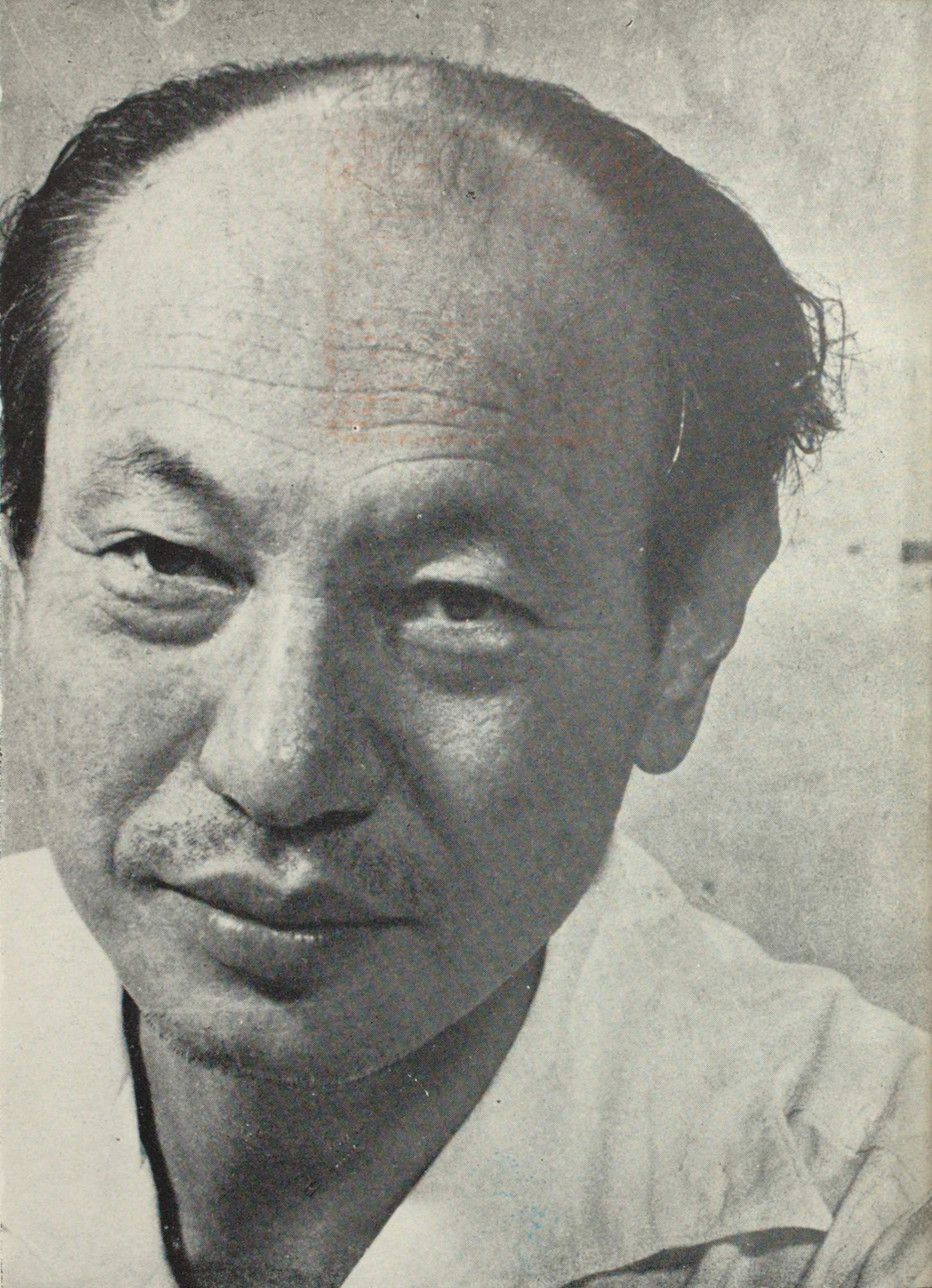
	First party	Second party	Third party
Leader	Shigeru Yoshida		Muneyoshi Tokugawa
Party	Liberal	Socialist	Ryokufūkai
Seats after	76	61	50
Popular vote	8,313,756	4,854,629	3,660,391
Percentage	29.70%	17.34%	13.08%
	Fourth party	Fifth party	Sixth party
Leader	Tomabechi Gizō	Hisao Kuroda	Kyuichi Tokuda
Party	National Democratic	Labourers and Farmers	JCP
Seats after	29	5	4
Popular vote	1,368,783	200,066	1,333,872
Percentage	4.89%	0.71%	4.76%
- Results of the election, showing the winning candidates in each prefecture and the national block.
President of the House of Councillors before election
Naotake Satō
Ryokufūkai
President of the House of Councillors-designate
Naotake Satō
Ryokufūkai

House of Councillors elections were held in Japan on 4 June 1950, electing half the seats in the House. The Liberal Party won the most seats.

== Results ==
Party	National			Constituency			Seats			
Party	Votes	%	Seats	Votes	%	Seats	Not up	Won	Total after	+/–
Liberal Party	8,313,756	29.70	18	10,414,995	35.91	34	24	52	76	New
Japan Socialist Party	4,854,629	17.34	15	7,316,808	25.23	21	25	36	61	+14
National Democratic Party	1,368,783	4.89	1	2,966,011	10.23	8	20	9	29	New
Ryokufūkai	3,660,391	13.08	6	1,773,576	6.11	3	41	9	50	New
Japanese Communist Party	1,333,872	4.76	2	1,637,451	5.65	0	2	2	4	0
Labourers and Farmers Party	200,066	0.71	1	471,649	1.63	1	3	2	5	New
Other parties	629,370	2.25	1	958,493	3.30	2	0	3	3	–
Independents	7,632,526	27.27	12	3,465,956	11.95	7	3	19	22	–89
Total	27,993,393	100.00	56	29,004,939	100.00	76	118	132	250	0
Valid votes	27,993,393	89.22		29,004,939	92.44					
Invalid/blank votes	3,382,542	10.78		2,371,573	7.56					
Total votes	31,375,935	100.00		31,376,512	100.00					
Registered voters/turnout	43,461,371	72.19		43,461,371	72.19					
Source: Ministry of Internal Affairs and Communications, National Diet

=== By constituency ===
Prefecture	Total seats	Seats won							
Prefecture	Total seats	LP	JSP	Ryokufūkai	NDP	LFP	JCP	Others	Ind.
Aichi	3	2	1						
Akita	1	1							
Aomori	1	1							
Chiba	2	2							
Ehime	1		1						
Fukui	1		1						
Fukuoka	3	1	1		1				
Fukushima	2	2							
Gifu	1	1							
Gunma	2				1				1
Hiroshima	3	1	1		1				
Hokkaido	4		2					2	
Hyōgo	3	1	1	1					
Ibaraki	2	1			1				
Ishikawa	1	1							
Iwate	1								1
Kagawa	1		1						
Kagoshima	2	1	1						
Kanagawa	2	1	1						
Kōchi	1	1							
Kumamoto	2	1			1				
Kyoto	2	1							1
Mie	1								1
Miyagi	1	1							
Miyazaki	1		1						
Nagano	2	1	1						
Nagasaki	1	1							
Nara	1			1					
Niigata	2	1	1						
Ōita	1	1							
Okayama	2	1	1						
Osaka	3	2	1						
Saga	1	1							
Saitama	2	1	1						
Shiga	1	1							
Shimane	1				1				
Shizuoka	2	1		1					
Tochigi	2	1	1						
Tokushima	1				1				
Tokyo	4	1	1		1	1			
Tottori	1		1						
Toyama	1								1
Wakayama	1								1
Yamagata	1		1						
Yamaguchi	1	1							
Yamanashi	1								1
National	56	18	15	6	1	1	2	1	12
Total	132	52	36	9	9	2	2	3	19
