= Cooperative Democratic Party =

Cooperative Democratic Party 協同民主党 Kyōdō Minshutō
- Founded: 24 May 1946
- Dissolved: 8 March 1947
- Preceded by: Japan Cooperative Party; Hyūga Minshuō; Nihon Nōhontō etc.
- Merged into: National Cooperative Party
- Headquarters: Tokyo
- Ideology: Co-operatism
- Political position: Centre

The Cooperative Democratic Party (Japanese: 協同民主党, Kyōdō Minshutō) was a political party in Japan.

== History ==
The party was established as the Cooperative Democratic Club on 24 May 1946 as a merger of the Japan Cooperative Party and several minor local parties with links to farmers or small businesses, and initially had 31 Diet members. Twelve days after its establishment, it was renamed the Cooperative Democratic Party (CDP).

Later in the year the party held talks with the Shinseikai about a merger, but a sticking point was the inclusion of the word "cooperative" in the new party's name, which the Shinseikai members were against. The dispute also led to two CDP members leaving the party due to their refusal to compromise. In March 1947, following the passing of a new electoral law that favoured larger parties, the CDP merged with the National Party to form the National Cooperative Party.
