= National Cooperative Party =

Political party in Japan

National Cooperative Party 国民協同党 Kokumin Kyōdōtō
- Founded: 8 March 1947
- Dissolved: 28 April 1950
- Merger of: Cooperative Democratic Party; National Party
- Merged into: National Democratic Party
- Headquarters: Tokyo
- Ideology: Co-operatism; Revisionist capitalism Humanitarianism
- Political position: Centre

The National Cooperative Party (Japanese: 国民協同党, Hepburn: Kokumin Kyōdōtō) was a centrist political party in Japan.

== History ==
The party was established on 8 March 1947 as a merger of the Cooperative Democratic Party and the National Party following seven months of talks. The merger was the result of fears that a new electoral system would make it more difficult for small parties to gain representation. Although it initially had 78 MPs, a group of 15 led by Heima Hayashi left to join the Democratic Party.

In the 1947 elections the party won 31 seats in the House of Representatives and nine in the House of Councillors. It joined Tetsu Katayama's coalition government and was given two cabinet positions; party chairman Takeo Miki was appointed Minister of Communications and Junzo Sasamori Minister in charge of the Demobilisation Agency. When Hitoshi Ashida formed a new government in 1948, the NCP remained in the coalition, with Okada Seiichi and Funada Kyōji appointed to the cabinet.

In early 1948 three MPs left to form the Social Reformist Party, and the party left the government when Ashida resigned later in the year. The 1949 elections saw the party reduced to 14 seats. In May 1949 it merged with the New Farmers' Party, the Social Reformist Party and several small parliamentary factions to form the New Politics Council.

In February 1950 the party was briefly re-established when several former party MPs left the New Politics Council, but in April 1950 it merged with the New Politics Council and the Democratic Party to form the National Democratic Party.

== Election results ==
=== House of Representatives ===
Election	Leader	Votes	%	Seats	+/-	Position	Status
1947	Takeo Miki	1,915,948	7.00	31 / 468	new	4th	Opposition
1949	Takeo Miki	1,041,879	3.41	14 / 466	▼17	5th	Opposition

=== House of Councillors ===
Election	Leader	Constituency			Party list			Seats	Position	Status
Election	Leader	Votes	%	Seats	Votes	%	Seats	Seats	Position	Status
1947	Takeo Miki	978,522	4.44	6 / 150	549,916	2.59	3 / 100	9 / 250	4th	Opposition
