= National Party (Japan) =

National Party 国民党
- Founded: July 1946
- Dissolved: 8 March 1947
- Merger of: Shinkō Club and Preparatory Committee for the Japan Democratic Party
- Merged into: National Cooperative Party
- Headquarters: Tokyo, Japan
- Political position: Centre

The National Party (Japanese: 国民党, Kokumintō) was a political party in Japan. A centrist party, its policies had a strong focus on education.

== History ==
The party was established in July 1946 as the Shinseikai (New Politics Society) by a merger of the Shinkō Club, some independent MPs and some MPs from the Preparatory Committee for the Japan Democratic Party, which was subsequently dissolved. It initially had 40 MPs, two of whom were amongst the eight MPs who voted against the new post-war constitution. Talks were held with the Cooperative Democratic Party about a merger in August 1946, and after they fell through, the party was renamed the National Party.

By September 1946 the party had been reduced to 33 MPs. In March 1947 another attempt was made to merge with the Cooperative Democratic Party, which this time was successful, resulting in the creation of the National Cooperative Party.
