= National Democratic Party (Japan) =

National Democratic Party 国民民主党
- Chairperson: Tomabechi Gizō
- Founded: 28 April 1950
- Dissolved: 8 February 1952
- Merger of: Democratic Party, National Cooperative Party and New Politics Council
- Merged into: Kaishintō
- Headquarters: Tokyo, Japan

The National Democratic Party (Japanese: 国民民主党, Kokumin Minshutō) was a political party in Japan. It was active from 1950 until 1952.

== History ==
The party was established on 28 April 1950 as a merger of the Democratic Party (the 47 National Diet members remaining in the party after another faction had left to form the Democratic Liberal Party), the National Cooperative Party (14 members) and the New Politics Council (five members); the new party also had 43 members of the House of Councillors, 36 from the DP and seven from the NPC.

House of Councillors elections were held in June 1950 and the new party contested all 132 seats. However, it had only nine members elected, and the heavy defeat led to tensions within the party over whether to join foreign policy discussions with the Liberal Party. Although the party leadership eventually agreed to join a coalition with the Liberals, the proposal was defeated at a party congress in January 1951.

Despite reservations from progressive members of the party, the NDP merged with Shinsei Club and the Farmers Cooperative Party in February 1952 to form the Kaishintō.

== Election results ==
=== House of Councillors ===
Election	Leader	Constituency			Party list			Seats		Position	Status
Election	Leader	Votes	%	Seats	Votes	%	Seats	Won	Total	Position	Status
1950	Tomabechi Gizō	2,966,011	10.23	8 / 76	1,368,783	4.89	1 / 56	9 / 132	29 / 250	4th	Opposition
