= Takeo Kurusu =

Japanese politician (1895–1966)

- 栗栖 赳夫
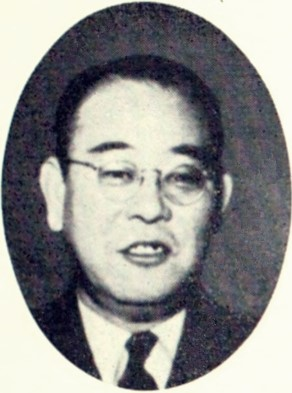

Minister of Finance
- In office 25 June 1947 – 10 March 1948
- Prime Minister: Tetsu Katayama
- Preceded by: Shōtarō Yano
- Succeeded by: Tokutarō Kitamura

Member of the House of Councillors
- In office 3 May 1947 – 26 March 1953
- Preceded by: Constituency established
- Succeeded by: Kimiko Abe
- Constituency: Yamaguchi at-large

Member of the House of Peers
- In office 19 June 1946 – 2 May 1947 Nominated by the Emperor

Personal details
- Born: 21 July 1895 Iwakuni, Yamaguchi, Japan
- Died: 10 May 1966 (aged 70)
- Party: Liberal (1952–1955)
- Other political affiliations: JLP (1945–1947); Ryokufūkai (1947); DP (1947–1950); NDP (1950–1952)
- Education: Tokyo Imperial University

Takeo Kurusu (栗栖赳夫; 1895–1966) was a politician in Japan's Democratic Party. He served in various political and government offices, including the minister of finance in the cabinet led by Prime Minister Tetsu Katayama.

== Political career ==
Kurusu was part of the Democratic Party and served as a member of the upper house. He was the minister of finance in the cabinet led by Prime Minister Tetsu Katayama. He also served as a minister without portfolio in the cabinet of Prime Minister Hitoshi Ashida and acted as the director of the economic planning board. While serving in the office he was arrested on 30 September 1948 together with many other senior Japanese politicians due to their alleged involvement in a bribery scandal in relation to the Showa Electric Company. The trials lasted until 1962, and Kurusu was one of three people who was found guilty and was sentenced to eight months in prison.
