= Kanagawa at-large district (House of Representatives) =

Former multi-member constituency of the Japanese House of Representatives

Kanagawa at-large district (Japanese: 神奈川県全県区, romanized: Kanagawa-ken zenken-ku) was a multi-member constituency of the House of Representatives in the National Diet of Japan. It was used only in the 22nd general election held in 1946. It elected 12 members by limited voting (each voter could cast up to three votes).

== Area ==
- The entirety of Kanagawa Prefecture

== Election results ==
Official recommendation (kōnin): endorsed by the candidate's party.

Rank	Candidate	Age	Party	Status	Votes	Notes
1	Tetsu Katayama	59	Japan Socialist Party	Incumbent	188,778	Official
2	Suzuki Ken'ichi	49	Independent		114,118	
3	Ichirō Kōno	49	Japan Liberal Party	Incumbent	105,963	Official
4	Okonogi Utaji	59	Japan Liberal Party		66,970	Official
5	Toshiko Matsuo	39	Japan Socialist Party		59,411	
6	Doi Naosaku	47	Japan Socialist Party		53,326	Official
7	Yamamoto Shōichi	46	Japan Liberal Party		49,125	Official
8	Yoshida Sei	38	Various parties		48,420	
9	Iwamoto Nobuyuki	52	Japan Liberal Party		44,767	
10	Miura Toranosuke	48	Japan Liberal Party		43,045	Official
11	Isozaki Teijo	57	Japan Liberal Party		39,286	Official
12	Kanai Yoshiji	53	Japan Socialist Party		37,572	Official
13	Nakanishi Inosuke	60	Japanese Communist Party		37,461	Official
14	Hagiwara Hisao	51	Independent		37,417	
15	Matsuo Kaemon	56	Independent		36,543	
16	Monji Ryō	50	Japan Socialist Party		35,322	Official
17	Takahashi Chōji	50	Japan Progressive Party		34,613	Official
18	Kanasashi Fujitarō	52	Japan Liberal Party		31,073	Official
19	Kogure Tōzaburō	67	Japan Liberal Party		29,924	Official
20	Kasuga Shōichi	40	Japanese Communist Party		29,795	Official
21	Ishikawa Kaname	55	Japan Liberal Party		29,386	
22	Okitsu Kura	40	Independent		28,614	
23	Ishikawa Kyōichi	49	Japan Socialist Party		28,431	Official
24	Uchino Takechiyo	46	Japanese Communist Party		27,972	Official
25	Suzuki Yūji	37	Various parties		27,949	
26	Itokawa Niichirō	55	Japan Socialist Party		26,671	Official
27	Aoki Tatsumi	55	Japan Progressive Party		26,312	Official
28	Sasaguchi Akira	43	Japan Socialist Party		26,308	
29	Ogura Bunji	65	Japan Progressive Party		24,215	Official
30	Nishimura Sadao	48	Japan Progressive Party		22,271	Official
31	Satō Kengichi	50	Japan Liberal Party		21,605	
32	Kurihara Noboru	49	Independent		21,417	
33	Nakayama Monji	47	Various parties		20,314	
34	Kanezō Ichirō	43	Japan Progressive Party		19,766	Official
35	Okano Kanki	51	Independent		19,569	
36	Ōkubo Hidetoshi	31	Various parties		17,892	
37	Nakano Yoemon	69	Japan Progressive Party		16,976	Official
38	Murofushi Kōshin	58	Independent		16,376	
39	Itō Hatsue	46	Independent		14,937	
40	Uemori Kotetsu	46	Independent		13,741	
41	Inoue Teizō	54	Japan Liberal Party		12,851	
42	Ōdate Takatoshi	58	Japan Liberal Party		11,938	
43	Kanzaki Masayoshi	46	Independent		11,762	
44	Kobayashi Yojiemon	61	Various parties		11,277	
45	Shimura Shigeharu	49	Independent		10,530	
46	Watanabe Shin	39	Various parties		9,626	
47	Hayami Kazuto	52	Japan Progressive Party		8,297	Official
48	Yamada Masaharu	33	Various parties		8,123	
49	Anzawa Eizaburō	44	Japan Socialist Party		8,023	
50	Andō Masaomi	61	Independent		7,863	
51	Katō Kitarō	31	Various parties		7,603	
52	Ōmori Jozo	46	Independent		6,370	
53	Ōnuki Masatake	53	Japan Liberal Party		5,528	
54	Ishii Shōkichi	45	Independent		5,324	
55	Matsuzaki Teiji	49	Independent		5,276	
56	Haraishi Tamegorō	43	Japan Progressive Party		5,178	Official
57	Hirose Hiroshi	54	Various parties		4,154	Official
58	Mori Chizuko	37	Japan Cooperative Party		4,000	Official
59	Matsuoka Ken	45	Various parties		3,941	
60	Wada Shūzō	47	Various parties		3,783	
61	Kakui Sadayoshi	45	Independent		3,776	
62	Iwata Takashi	36	Independent		3,436	
63	Hase Iwao	69	Various parties		3,375	
64	Aragaki Takehisa	48	Independent		3,242	
65	Uchiyama Natsuo	33	Various parties		2,769	
66	Mori Kazuo	48	Japan Cooperative Party		2,492	Official
67	Watahiki Masao	47	Various parties		2,132	
68	Tsukayama Chinshō	51	Independent		2,081	
69	Ueki Kamisūzō	45	Various parties		1,935	
70	Takahashi Hiroshi	45	Various parties		1,852	
71	Yokota Kinzō	42	Independent		1,576	
72	Hirohata Shūji	52	Independent		1,180	
73	Fujisawa Masaharu	39	Various parties		1,053	
74	Yasui Risaku	47	Various parties		909	
75	Iwanaga Chūji	45	Independent		884	
76	Takahashi Seigi	44	Independent		617	
77	Yamada Kōzō	46	Various parties		480	

== See also ==
- Previous districts
  - Kanagawa 1st district (1928–1942)
  - Kanagawa 2nd district (1928–1942)
  - Kanagawa 3rd district (1928–1942)
- Subsequent districts
  - Kanagawa 1st district (1947–1993)
  - Kanagawa 2nd district (1947–1993)
  - Kanagawa 3rd district (1947–1993)
