= 1947 Japanese general election =

- 25 April 1947

All 468 seats in the House of Representatives 235 seats needed for a majority
- Turnout: 67.95% (▼4.13pp)
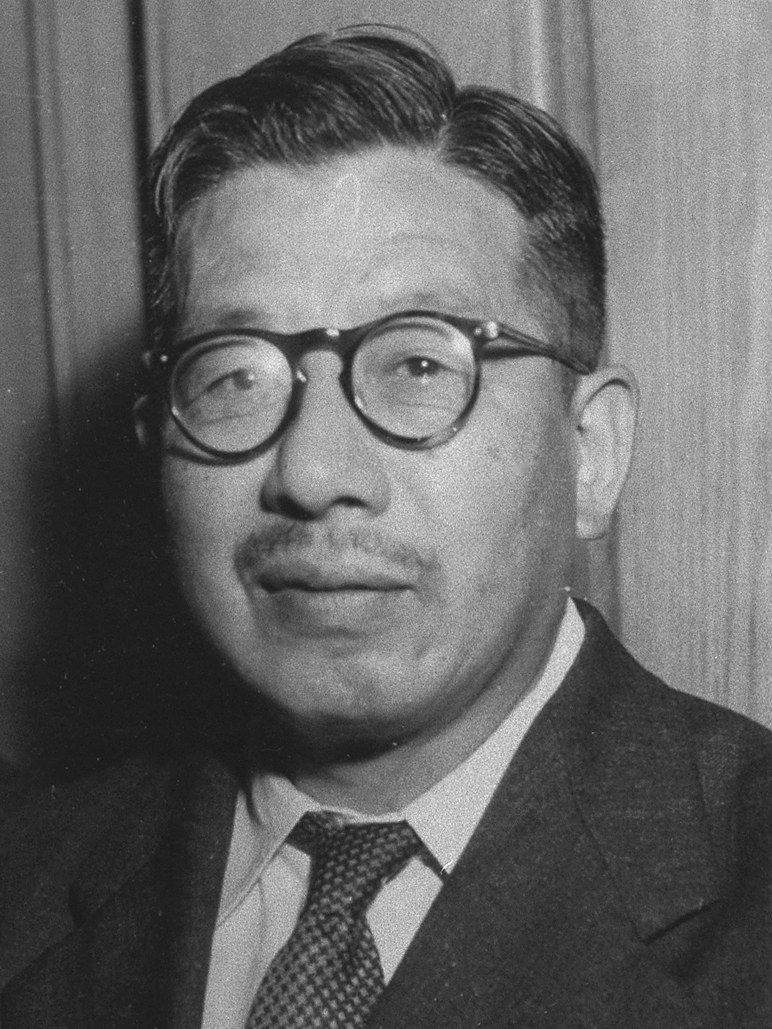

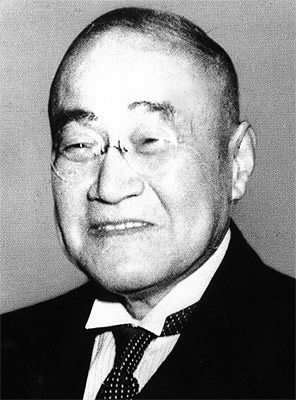

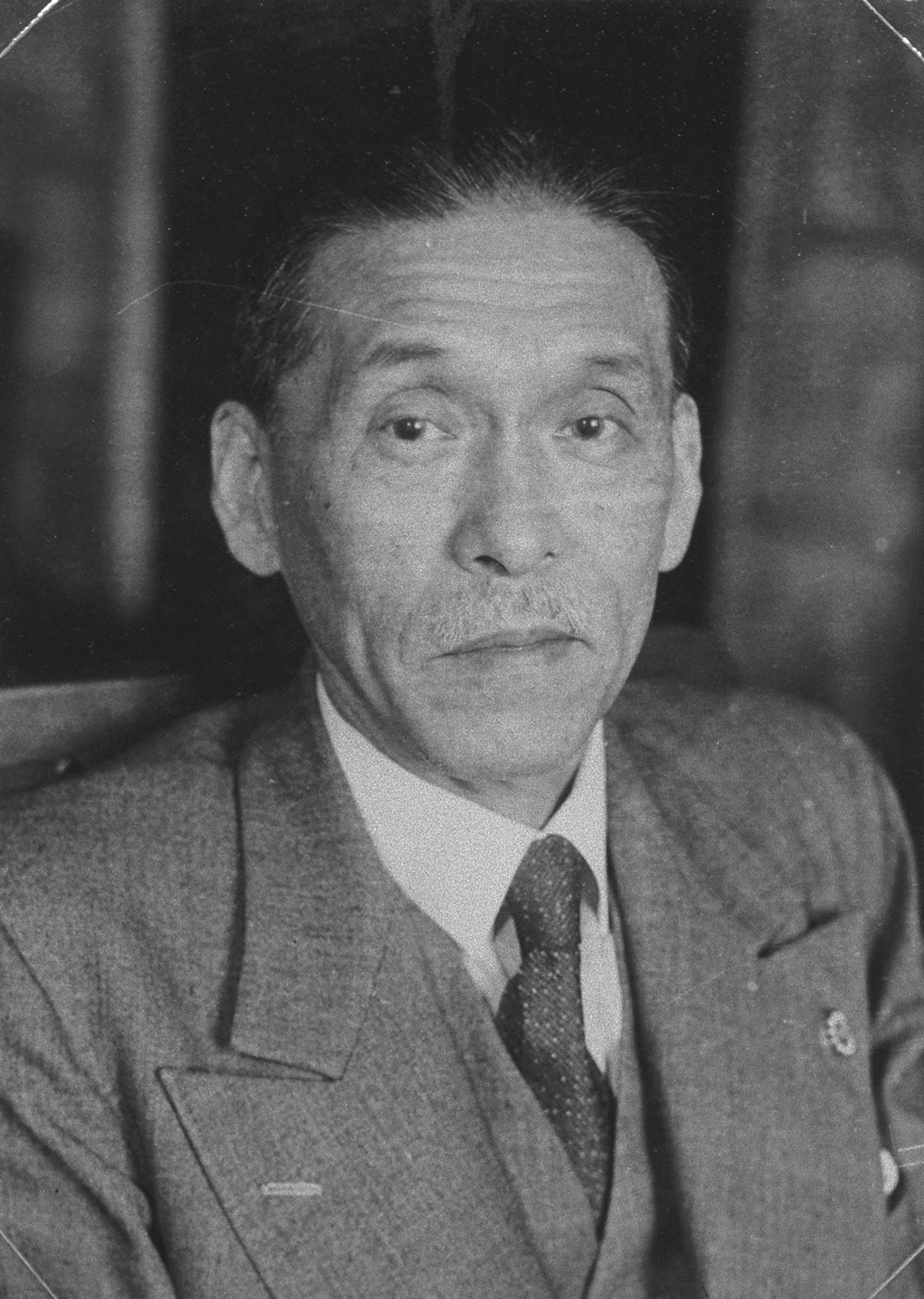

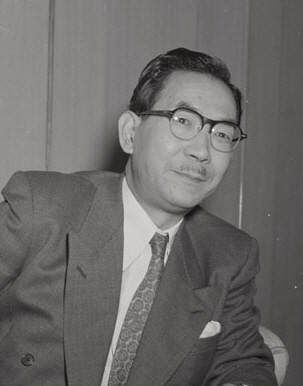

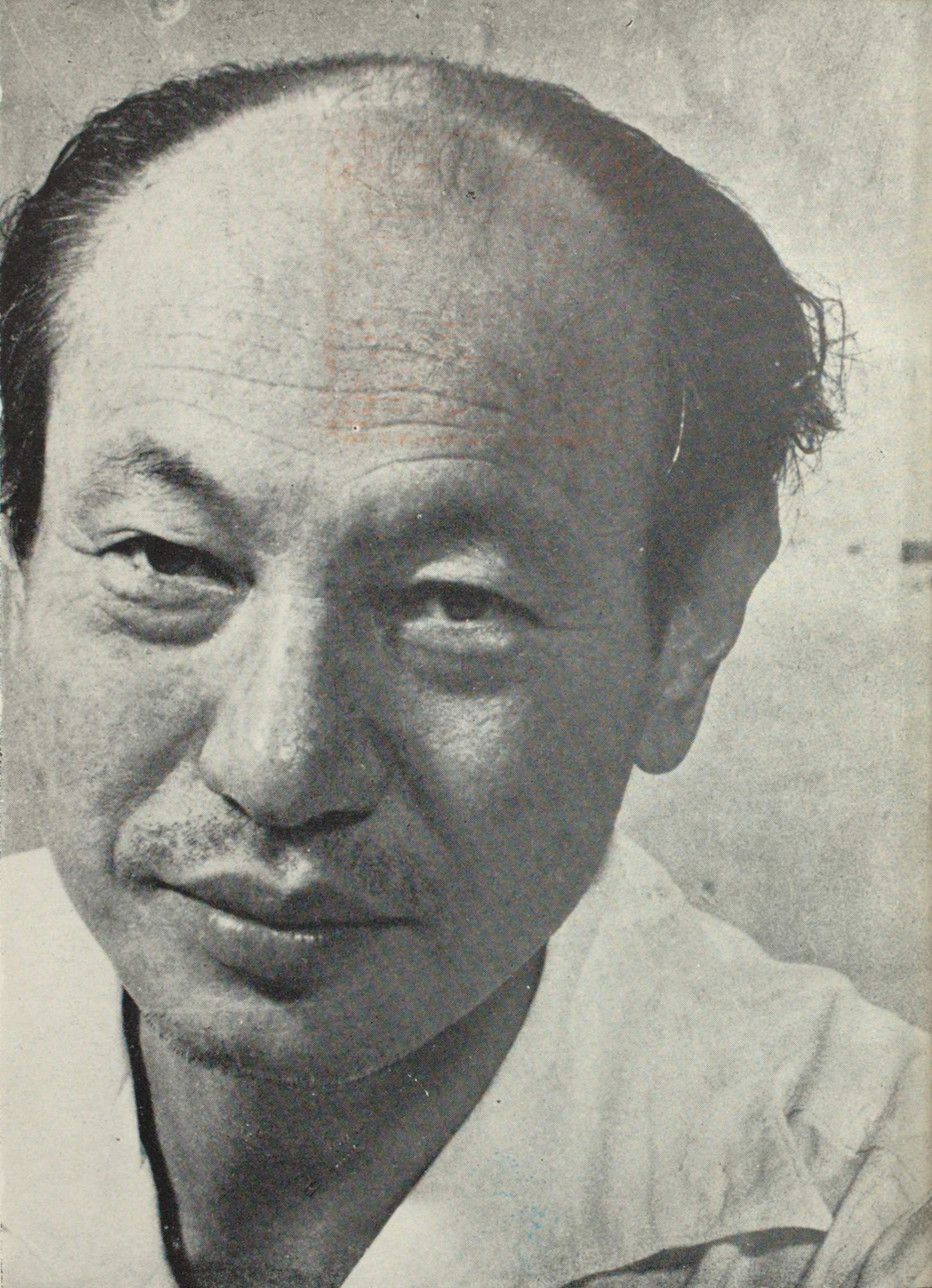

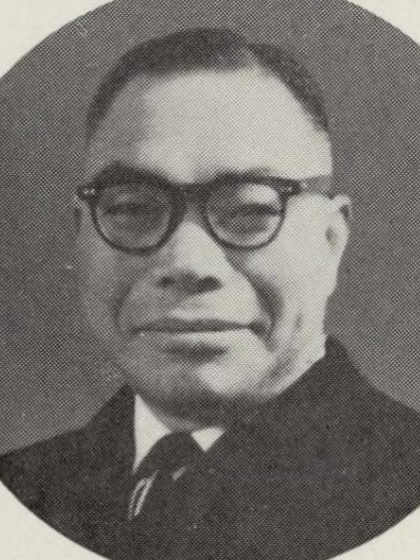
	First party	Second party	Third party
Leader	Tetsu Katayama	Shigeru Yoshida	Hitoshi Ashida
Party	Socialist	Liberal	Democratic
Last election	17.90%, 93 seats	24.36%, 141 seats	Did not exist
Seats won	143	131	124
Seat change	▲50	▼10	New
Popular vote	7,176,882	7,312,524	6,960,270
Percentage	26.23%	26.73%	25.44%
Swing	▲8.33pp	▲2.37pp	New
	Fourth party	Fifth party	Sixth party
Leader	Takeo Miki	Kyuichi Tokuda	Shiro Nakano
Party	National Cooperative	JCP	Farmers
Last election	Did not exist	3.85%, 5 seats	Did not exist
Seats won	31	4	4
Seat change	New	▼1	New
Popular vote	1,915,948	1,002,883	214,754
Percentage	7.00%	3.67%	0.78%
Swing	New	▼0.18pp	New
- Districts shaded according to winners' vote strength
Prime Minister before election
Shigeru Yoshida
Liberal
Elected Prime Minister
Tetsu Katayama
Socialist

General elections were held in Japan on 25 April 1947. The Japan Socialist Party won 143 of the 468 seats, making it the largest party in the House of Representatives following the election. Voter turnout was 68%. It was the last election technically held under the Meiji Constitution in preparation for the current Constitution of Japan which became effective several days later on 3 May 1947. The upper house of the Diet was also elected by the people under the new constitution, the first ordinary election of members of the House of Councillors had been held five days before.

Numerous prominent figures were elected to the House of Representatives for the first time in this election, including former Prime Minister and House of Peers member Kijūrō Shidehara, then-Prime Minister and former House of Peers member Shigeru Yoshida, and future Prime Ministers Tanzan Ishibashi, Zenko Suzuki and Kakuei Tanaka.

Yoshida remained Prime Minister following the election, acting until a successor was appointed – under the new Constitution, the cabinet depends on parliamentary support and must resign in the first Diet session after a House of Representatives election.

== Results ==
Party	Votes	%	Seats	+/–
Liberal Party	7,312,524	26.73	131	−10
Japan Socialist Party	7,176,882	26.23	143	+50
Democratic Party	6,960,270	25.44	124	New
National Cooperative Party	1,915,948	7.00	31	New
Japanese Communist Party	1,002,883	3.67	4	−1
Japan Farmers Party	214,754	0.78	4	New
Other parties	1,174,662	4.29	17	–
Independents	1,603,684	5.86	12	−69
Vacant			2	–
Total	27,361,607	100.00	468	0
Valid votes	27,361,607	98.43		
Invalid/blank votes	436,141	1.57		
Total votes	27,797,748	100.00		
Registered voters/turnout	40,907,493	67.95		
Source: Oscarsson, Masumi

=== By prefecture ===
Prefecture	Total seats	Seats won								
Prefecture	Total seats	JSP	LP	DP	NCP	JFP	JCP	Others	Ind.	Vacant
Aichi	19	6	4	6	2	1				
Akita	8	3	2	1				2		
Aomori	7		2	3	1			1		
Chiba	13	1	8	3					1	
Ehime	9	3	3	3						
Fukui	4			3				1		
Fukuoka	19	7	3	6				2	1	
Fukushima	12	3	4	4				1		
Gifu	9	2	4	3						
Gunma	10	3	1	5	1					
Hiroshima	12	6	3	1	2					
Hokkaido	22	8	7	3	1	3				
Hyōgo	18	5	2	10	1					
Ibaraki	12	3	2	5	1			1		
Ishikawa	6		1	4					1	
Iwate	8	2	4	2						
Kagawa	6	2		2	1			1		
Kagoshima	10	2	1	4	1			1	1	
Kanagawa	13	6	5	1	1					
Kōchi	5	1	2	1					1	
Kumamoto	10	2	3	5						
Kyoto	10	5	3	2						
Mie	9	1	2	4				1	1	
Miyagi	9	3	4	1				1		
Miyazaki	6	3			2				1	
Nagano	13	2	3	3	3		1	1		
Nagasaki	9	2	4	2				1		
Nara	5	1	1			1			2	
Niigata	15	6	5	4						
Ōita	7	2	1	3	1					
Okayama	10	3	4	1	2					
Okinawa	2									2
Osaka	19	9	4	5					1	
Saga	5	1	2	1	1					
Saitama	13	4	6	3						
Shiga	5	1	2	1	1					
Shimane	5	2		2			1			
Shizuoka	14	5	5	2	2					
Tochigi	10	3	1	4	1				1	
Tokushima	5	1	1		3					
Tokyo	27	12	8	4	1		2			
Tottori	4	2	1					1		
Toyama	6	1	2	2	1					
Wakayama	6	2	3		1					
Yamagata	8	3	3	2						
Yamaguchi	9	2	3	2				1	1	
Yamanashi	5	2	2	1						
Total	468	143	131	124	31	5	4	16	12	2

== Aftermath ==
=== Government formation ===
The 1st National Diet convened on 20 May. After early coalition negotiations, Socialist Komakichi Matsuoka was elected Speaker of the lower house on 21 May, Democrat Man'itsu Tanaka Vice-Speaker. The new constitution introduced a parliamentary system of government: the prime minister became elected by and responsible to the National Diet, with the House of Representatives now being able to override the upper house. On 23 May, both houses of the Diet elected the leader of the Socialist Party, Tetsu Katayama, as prime minister – virtually unopposed as Liberals and Democrats agreed to vote for Katayama even though coalition negotiations had not yet produced final results. SCAP Douglas MacArthur welcomed the choice, thereby reducing resistance by some politicians to a Socialist-led coalition government. The Socialists initially sought a Grand Coalition with the Liberals and possibly including Democrats and Cooperativists, but the Liberals refused. Katayama eventually formed a coalition with the Democratic Party and the Kokumin Kyōdōtō (People's/National Cooperative Party), it could also count on support by the Ryokufūkai (Green Breeze Society), the largest group in the House of Councillors. Katayama was ceremonially appointed by the Emperor on 24 May, the other ministers in the Katayama Cabinet on 1 June after the conclusion of the coalition negotiations.

=== New government ===
The new government enacted several reforms sought by the SCAP, such as the dissolution of the powerful Home Ministry and anti-trust legislation to dismantle the zaibatsu. However, internal divisions in the Socialist Party soon surfaced and led to Katayama's resignation in February 1948 when the lower house budget committee, chaired by left-wing Socialist Mosaburō Suzuki, rejected the cabinet's draft budget. After an even shorter government under Katayama's deputy, Democrat Hitoshi Ashida, the coalition collapsed, and Liberal Shigeru Yoshida returned as prime minister in October 1948 by which time the Liberals (reformed as Democratic Liberal Party in March 1948) had gained the position as first party in the lower house by defectors from the Democratic Party and independents joining, though by far not an absolute majority. In December 1948, Yoshida staged a no-confidence vote (under the prevailing (SCAP) interpretation of the Constitution at the time, the House of Representatives could only be dissolved under the provisions of article 69; referred to in Japanese as nareai kaisan (馴れ合い解散, "collusive dissolution")) to gain an outright DLP majority in the ensuing 1949 lower house election.
