= Fujimi-chō Church =

Protestant church in Tokyo, Japan

Fujimi-cho Church
- 富士見町教会
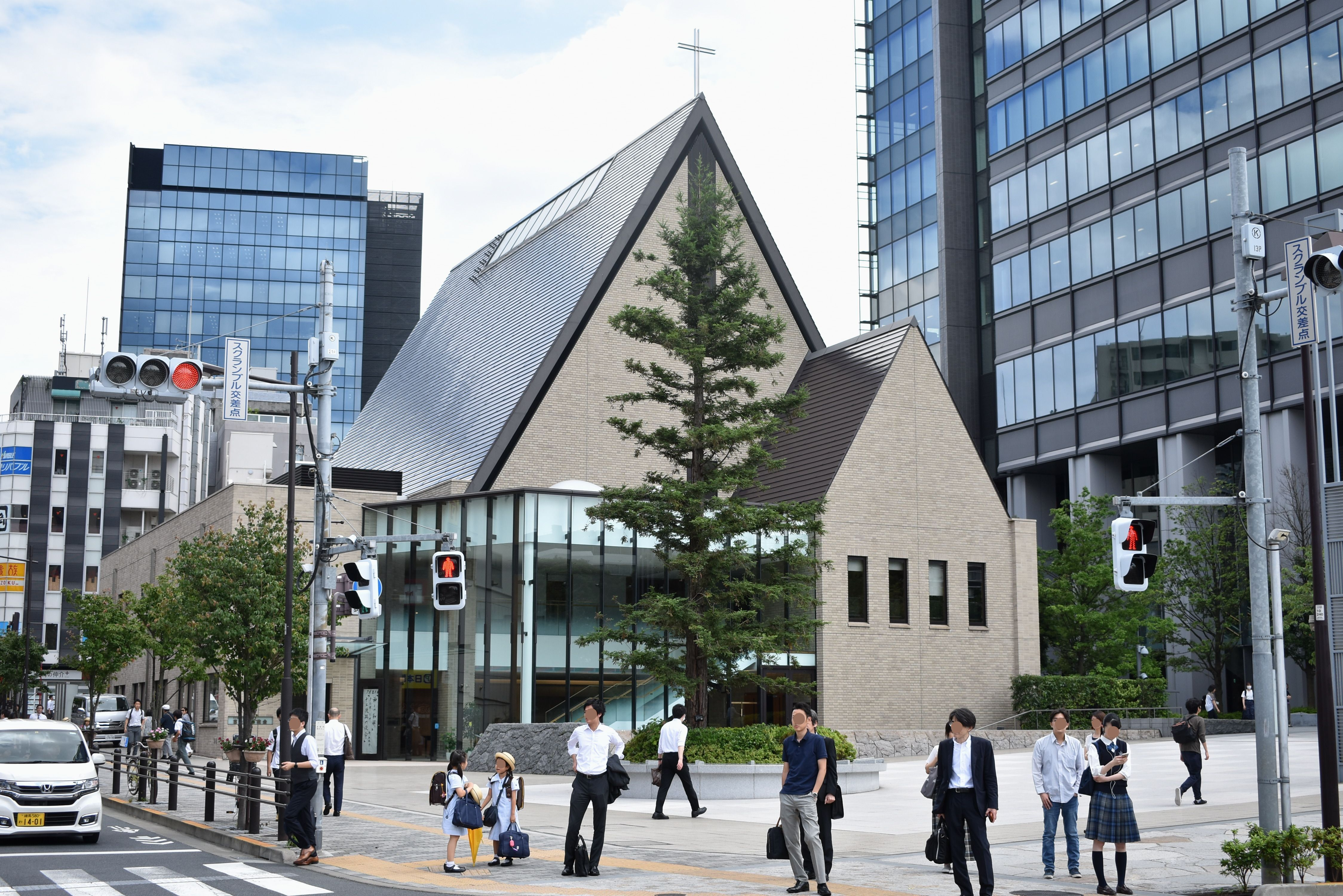
- Fujimi-cho Church (photographed 19 July 2019)
- Fujimi-cho Church
- 35°42′07″N 139°44′42″E
- Location: 2-10-1 Fujimi, Chiyoda, Tokyo, Japan
- Country: Japan
- Denomination: United Church of Christ in Japan (Protestant)
- Website: www.fujimicho-kyokai.org

History
- Founded: March 1887
- Founder: Uemura Masahisa

Fujimi-cho Church (Japanese: 富士見町教会, Fujimi-chō Kyōkai) is a Protestant church belonging to the United Church of Christ in Japan, located in Fujimi 2-chome, Chiyoda, Tokyo. It is one of the representative churches of Japanese Protestantism founded by Uemura Masahisa.

== History ==
After graduating from the Tokyo Union Theological School (Tokyo Icchi Shingakkō), Uemura Masahisa began pioneer evangelism. In March 1887 he established the Bancho Church of the Japan Church of Christ (Nihon Kirisuto Icchi Kyōkai) in Sanbanchō, Kōjimachi. Later that year a church building was constructed at 48 Ichibanchō, Kōjimachi, and the congregation relocated there. In 1890, when the denomination changed its name to the Church of Christ in Japan (Nihon Kirisuto Kyōkai), the church was renamed Ichibanchō Church.

In 1906 the congregation moved to a newly built sanctuary at 6-3 Fujimi-chō and adopted its present name, Fujimi-cho Church. During the Taishō period it became a central congregation of the Church of Christ in Japan, largely due to Uemura’s influence.

The church building was completely destroyed in the 1923 Great Kantō earthquake. After receiving a new plot of land, a new sanctuary was dedicated on 15 July 1929. It was rebuilt in 1985 and again in August 2013 as part of the Iidabashi Station West Exit urban redevelopment project (Iidabashi Grand Bloom). The current building stands at 2-10-1 Fujimi, Chiyoda.

On 24–25 June 1941 the founding general assembly of the United Church of Christ in Japan was held at Fujimi-cho Church.

== Pastors ==
- 1st: Uemura Masahisa (1887–1925)
- 2nd: Minami Renpei (1925–1926)
- 3rd: Miyoshi Tsutomu (1927–1948)
- 4th: Shimamura Kikaku (1950–1979)
- 5th: Kawazome Saburō
- 6th: Matsunaga Kikuo
- 7th: Kurahashi Yasuo
- 8th: Fujimori Yūki (2014–present)

== Notable members ==
- Nakajima Nobuyuki (first Speaker of the House of Representatives)
- Shimada Saburō (member of the House of Representatives)
- Kimura Kumaji (founder of Meiji Jogakkō)
- Iwamoto Yoshiharu
- Uzawa Fusaaki (president of Meiji University)
- Uzawa Masakazu (president of Aoyama Gakuin University)
- Yano Tsuraki (president of Meiji Gakuin)
- Yamamuro Kieko (Salvation Army officer and wife of Yamamuro Gunpei)
- Katayama Tetsu (Prime Minister of Japan)
- Matsuoka Komakichi (Speaker of the House of Representatives)
- Hibiki Nobusuke (Imperial Japanese Army major general)
- Munesue Kikuma (councillor of the Ministry of Communications)
- Ono Tokusaburō (Imperial Japanese Navy vice admiral; 8th president of Aoyama Gakuin)
- Horiuchi Keizō (music critic)
- Yamamoto Tadaoki (scientist and professor at Waseda University)
- Ibuka Masaru (businessman)

== Location ==
- 2-10-1 Fujimi, Chiyoda-ku, Tokyo 102-0071

== Access ==
- Near the west exit of JR Iidabashi Station

== See also ==
- United Church of Christ in Japan
