= Katayama cabinet =

Cabinet of Japan (1947–1948)

Katayama Cabinet
- 46th Cabinet of Japan

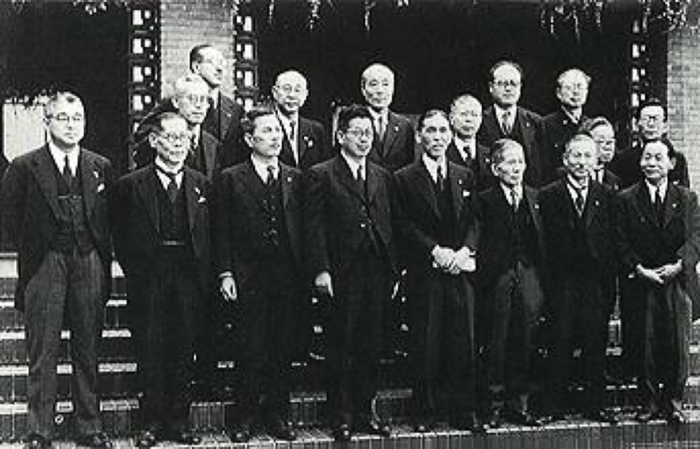
- The Katayama Cabinet after the appointment ceremony of State Ministers (1 June 1947)
- Date formed: 24 May 1947
- Date dissolved: 10 March 1948

People and organisations
- Emperor: Shōwa
- Prime Minister: Tetsu Katayama
- Deputy Prime Minister: Hitoshi Ashida (from 1 June 1947)
- Member parties: (Allied occupation); Japan Socialist Party; Democratic Party; National Cooperative Party
- Status in legislature: Majority (coalition)
- Opposition parties: Liberal Party; Japanese Communist Party; Japan Farmers Party

History
- Elections: 1947 councillors election 1947 Japanese general election
- Legislature term: 2nd National Diet
- Predecessor: First Yoshida Cabinet
- Successor: Ashida Cabinet

No majority without coalition: Composition of the House of Representatives after the 1947 general election

Composition of the House of Councillors after the 1947 ordinary election. A majority of the elected independents formed the Ryokufūkai group in the first Diet session.

The Katayama Cabinet (片山内閣, Katayama naikaku) governed Japan under the premiership of Tetsu Katayama from 24 May 1947 to 10 March 1948, during the Allied occupation. It was the first cabinet under the postwar constitution and the first socialist-led government in Japanese history.

== Background and formation ==
The 1947 Japanese general election (23rd House of Representatives election, held on 25 April 1947) and the simultaneous first House of Councillors election produced a three-party balance among the Japan Socialist Party (JSP), the Japan Liberal Party, and the Democratic Party, with the smaller National Cooperative Party also represented. The Socialists emerged as the largest party in the House of Representatives (143 seats out of 466), followed by the Liberals (131) and Democrats (124).

Incumbent Prime Minister Shigeru Yoshida of the Liberal Party, having lost first-party status, decided to resign after consulting former party president Ichirō Hatoyama. The Socialists, however, had not expected to become the largest party and were unprepared to form a government immediately. Party Secretary-General Suehiro Nishio initially favoured a grand coalition of Liberals, Democrats, Socialists and Cooperativists under Yoshida, with the Socialists taking the initiative in stabilising the political situation.

Coalition talks among the four parties proved difficult. The Liberals and the conservative wing of the Democrats (led by former Prime Minister Kijūrō Shidehara) objected to the inclusion of the Socialist left, which was regarded as close to the Japanese Communist Party. Within the Socialist Party itself there was sharp disagreement over cooperation with conservative parties. On 15 May the Socialist left publicly declared that it would draw a clear line with the Communists. On 18 May the Democratic Party congress decided to join a coalition; Hitoshi Ashida became party president while Shidehara was made honorary president. Agreement was thereby reached on a three-party coalition of Socialists, Democrats and National Cooperativists.

Negotiations with the Liberals continued to stall because of Yoshida’s firm opposition to Socialist left-wing participation. On 23 May, amid rumours of a possible anti-communist Liberal–Democratic (Shidehara faction) coalition, the Socialists forced an early prime-ministerial designation vote in both houses of the Diet before any other business could be conducted (as required by the new constitution). Katayama was elected almost unanimously (420 of 426 votes present in the House of Representatives; 205 of 207 in the House of Councillors). On 24 May he was formally invested by the Emperor and formed a temporary “one-man cabinet” in which he held all ministerial posts concurrently. The same day GHQ welcomed the choice, describing it as evidence that Japanese politics was taking a “middle-of-the-road” course.

Further talks with the Liberals were abandoned because of fears that bringing them into the cabinet would either import internal Democratic Party rivalries or allow the two conservative parties to dominate policy. On 1 June the full cabinet was appointed, consisting of Socialists, Democrats, National Cooperativists and one member of the Ryokufūkai (the largest group in the House of Councillors, formed by independents). The Liberals ultimately remained outside the government, offering only external support; in reality Yoshida is believed to have preferred to avoid the risks of an unstable four-party administration.

The day after the full cabinet was completed, Katayama delivered the radio address known as the Appeal to the Nation (国民諸君に訴う) on NHK (2 June 1947). On 1 July he gave his first administrative policy speech to the National Diet under the new Constitution. These statements set out the government’s justification for the three-party coalition, its centrist orientation, commitment to the Constitution, diagnosis of the postwar economic and food crises, and call for national austerity and a “spiritual revolution”.

== Policies and major events ==
Key measures of the Katayama Cabinet included:

- Coal-mine state control – The Socialists’ flagship policy. A bill for temporary state management of the coal industry was introduced, promising full nationalisation if annual production failed to reach 30 million tonnes. Democratic Party opposition and intense lobbying by mine owners led to major dilutions: the proposed labour–management production councils were reduced from decision-making to advisory bodies. The final law was a far cry from genuine state control. The controversy nevertheless provoked a major split: the Shidehara faction of the Democrats broke away, later joining the Liberals to form the Democratic Liberal Party.
- Supreme Court appointments – After consultation with the Judges Appointment Consultative Committee, Tadahiko Mibuchi was named the first Chief Justice of the Supreme Court on 4 August 1947 and fourteen Associate Justices were appointed.
- Administrative reform – Enactment of the National Public Service Law (aimed at turning civil servants into “public servants”), abolition of the Home Ministry, creation of the National Rural Police and approximately 1,600 municipal police forces under the new Police Law, and establishment of the Construction Board and the Ministry of Labour. The cabinet had initially been reluctant to dismantle the police structure but was pressed by Government Section of GHQ.
- Social legislation – Introduction of unemployment insurance; revision of the Civil Code to abolish the feudal family system; and revision of the Penal Code.
- Kanagawa Tax Office incident – The killing of a tax official by producers of illicit liquor prompted stronger inter-ministerial coordination as part of the government’s emergency economic measures.

== Internal conflicts and resignation ==
From the outset the coalition was unstable, strained by left–right divisions inside the Socialist Party and Democratic Party hostility toward the Socialist left. In October 1947 a dispute over the method of setting rice prices brought into the open the rivalry between Nishio and Agriculture Minister Rikizō Hirano. Rumours that Hirano was preparing to form a new conservative party with Yoshida led GHQ’s Government Section (Charles L. Kades) to demand Hirano’s dismissal. Katayama removed him on 30 October; Hirano and his followers left to form the Social Reformist Party (Hirano was later purged).

The succession to the Agriculture portfolio further alienated the Socialist left, which had wanted its own candidate. On 13 December 84 left-wing Diet members issued an “intra-party opposition declaration” reserving the right of free criticism and action against the cabinet. At the party convention in January 1948 the right wing retained control of the executive, but the four-party policy agreement was abandoned because the Liberals had moved into opposition.

The final crisis concerned the supplementary budget for civil-service cost-of-living allowances. The Finance Ministry proposed financing it by raising railway and communications charges; the Economic Stabilization Board preferred higher income-tax revenue. The Socialist left, led by Budget Committee chairman Mosaburō Suzuki, rejected the former as an attempt to set ordinary citizens against public employees. After GHQ backed the Finance Ministry draft, Suzuki used his committee powers to force through a revised budget based on the Stabilization Board plan, supported only by the Socialist left, the Liberals and the Communists.

On 6 February 1948 Economic Stabilization Board Director-General Hiroo Wada attempted to mediate, but Ashida and National Cooperative leader Takeo Miki demanded that the Socialist executive expel the left. Faced with an unworkable situation and advised by Nishio to step down temporarily in order to deal with the left, Katayama decided on the resignation of the entire cabinet. The cabinet resigned on 10 February 1948. Although the Liberals claimed the “constitutional custom” of inviting the largest opposition party to form the next government, GHQ preferred continuation of the non-Liberal coalition. On 21 February Ashida was elected prime minister; the Katayama Cabinet remained in office until Ashida’s formal investiture on 10 March. The three-party coalition continued under the short-lived Ashida Cabinet.

== Cabinet ==
The Japan Socialist Party (Nihon Shakaitō, JSP) had emerged as strongest party from both the 23rd lower house election and the 1st upper house election. However, the formation of a coalition proved difficult as any majority coalition would involve at least two of the three largest parties. While the Socialists offered the conservative Japan Liberal Party (Nihon Jiyūtō, JLP) of incumbent prime minister Shigeru Yoshida a grand coalition, Yoshida refused active participation in the government. Under the new constitution, the prime minister was no longer selected by the Emperor, but elected by the Diet, "before the conduct of any other business" – and the Socialists pushed for an early vote to prevent the other two major parties from excluding them from a ruling coalition: on May 23, Socialist Tetsu Katayama was elected almost unopposed (420 votes of 426 present in the House of Representatives, 205 of 207 in the House of Councillors) while the coalition negotiations were still in progress. When Katayama formally became prime minister on May 24 after his ceremonial investiture by the Emperor, he technically held all ministerial posts – a so-called "one-man cabinet" (hitori naikaku, 一人内閣). The JLP still refused cooperation, and the JSP eventually agreed on a coalition with the Democratic Party (Minshutō) and the National Cooperative Party (Kokumin Kyōdōtō). Together, the three parties held a solid majority in the HR, and were able to control the HC given the fact that the largest group there, the Ryokufūkai formed by independents, was willing to support the government. The other cabinet members were eventually appointed on June 1. The cabinet initially consisted of seven Socialists (including the prime minister), eight Democrats, two Cooperativists and one Ryokufūkai member.

After conflicts over price controls and taxes, the left wing of the Socialist Party threatened to block the budget for fiscal 1948 (begins in April), and in February 1948, Katayama resigned. Deputy prime minister Hitoshi Ashida was elected on February 21 to succeed him, the Katayama Cabinet remained in office until his investiture on March 10. The three-party coalition of Socialists, Democrats and Cooperativists continued under Democrat Ashida, however the Ashida Cabinet would be engulfed by the largest corruption scandal of the occupation period and last even shorter.

| Portfolio | Name | Political party | Term start | Term end |
|---|---|---|---|---|
| Prime Minister | Tetsu Katayama | Socialist | May 24, 1947 | March 10, 1948 |
| Deputy Prime Minister | Hitoshi Ashida | Democratic | June 1, 1947 | March 10, 1948 |
| Minister for Foreign Affairs | Tetsu Katayama (acting) | Socialist | May 24, 1947 | June 1, 1947 |
| Minister for Foreign Affairs | Hitoshi Ashida | Democratic | June 1, 1947 | March 10, 1948 |
| Minister of Home Affairs | Tetsu Katayama (acting) | Socialist | May 24, 1947 | June 1, 1947 |
| Minister of Home Affairs | Kozaemon Kimura | Democratic | June 1, 1947 | December 31, 1947 |
| Minister of Finance | Tetsu Katayama (acting) | Socialist | May 24, 1947 | June 1, 1947 |
| Minister of Finance | Yano Shōtarō | Democratic | June 1, 1947 | June 25, 1947 |
| Minister of Finance | Takeo Kurusu | Independent | June 25, 1947 | March 10, 1948 |
| Minister of Justice | Tetsu Katayama (acting) | Socialist | May 24, 1947 | June 1, 1947 |
| Minister of Justice | Suzuki Yoshio | Socialist | June 1, 1947 | February 15, 1948 |
| Attorney General | Suzuki Yoshio | Socialist | February 15, 1948 | March 10, 1948 |
| Minister of Education | Tetsu Katayama (acting) | Socialist | May 24, 1947 | June 1, 1947 |
| Minister of Education | Morito Tatsuo | Socialist | June 1, 1947 | March 10, 1948 |
| Minister of Health | Tetsu Katayama (acting) | Socialist | May 24, 1947 | June 1, 1947 |
| Minister of Health | Hitotsumatsu Sadayoshi | Democratic | June 1, 1947 | March 10, 1948 |
| Minister of Agriculture, Forestry and Fisheries | Tetsu Katayama (acting) | Socialist | May 24, 1947 | June 1, 1947 |
| Minister of Agriculture, Forestry and Fisheries | Rikizō Hirano | Socialist | June 1, 1947 | November 4, 1947 |
| Minister of Agriculture, Forestry and Fisheries | Tetsu Katayama (acting) | Socialist | November 4, 1947 | December 13, 1947 |
| Minister of Agriculture, Forestry and Fisheries | Hatano Kanae | Socialist | December 13, 1947 | March 10, 1948 |
| Minister of Commerce and Industry | Tetsu Katayama (acting) | Socialist | May 24, 1947 | June 1, 1947 |
| Minister of Commerce and Industry | Mizutani Chōzaburō | Socialist | June 1, 1947 | March 10, 1948 |
| Minister of Transport | Tetsu Katayama (acting) | Socialist | May 24, 1947 | June 1, 1947 |
| Minister of Transport | Tomabechi Gizō | Democratic | June 1, 1947 | December 4, 1947 |
| Minister of Transport | Kitamura Tokutarō | Democratic | December 4, 1947 | March 10, 1948 |
| Minister of Communications | Tetsu Katayama (acting) | Socialist | May 24, 1947 | June 1, 1947 |
| Minister of Communications | Takeo Miki | National Cooperative | June 1, 1947 | March 10, 1948 |
| Minister of Labor | Yonekubo Mitsusuke | Socialist | September 1, 1947 | March 10, 1948 |
| Minister of State Director-General of the Economic Stabilization Board | Vacant | | May 24, 1947 | June 1, 1947 |
| Minister of State Director-General of the Economic Stabilization Board | Wada Hirō | Independent | June 1, 1947 | March 10, 1948 |
| Minister of State Chief of the Price Board | Vacant | | May 24, 1947 | May 27, 1947 |
| Minister of State Chief of the Price Board | Tetsu Katayama | Socialist | May 27, 1947 | June 1, 1947 |
| Minister of State Chief of the Price Board | Wada Hirō | Independent | June 1, 1947 | March 10, 1948 |
| Minister of State President of the Demobilization Board (from June 1, 1947, until October 15, 1947) Director-General of the Board of Reparations (from February 1, 1948) | Sasamori Junzō | National Cooperative | June 1, 1947 | March 10, 1948 |
| Minister of State President of the Administrative Research Board | Saitō Takao | Democratic | June 1, 1947 | March 10, 1948 |
| Minister of State Chairman of the Local Finance Committee (from January 7, 1948) | Takeda Giichi | Democratic | December 4, 1947 | March 10, 1948 |
| Minister of State President of the Construction Board | Kozaemon Kimura | Democratic | January 1, 1948 | March 10, 1948 |
| Minister of State | Hayashi Heima | Democratic | June 1, 1947 | November 25, 1947 |
| Minister of State | Yonekubo Mitsusuke | Socialist | June 1, 1947 | September 1, 1947 |
| Minister of State Chief Cabinet Secretary | Suehiro Nishio | Socialist | June 1, 1947 | March 10, 1948 |
| Director-General of the Cabinet Legislation Bureau | Satō Tatsuo | Independent | June 14, 1947 | February 15, 1948 |
| Deputy Chief Cabinet Secretary | Takikawa Sueichi | Socialist | June 10, 1947 | March 10, 1948 |
| Deputy Chief Cabinet Secretary | Sone Eki | Independent | June 17, 1947 | March 10, 1948 |
