= Tetsu Katayama =

Prime Minister of Japan from 1947 to 1948

Junior Second Rank Tetsu Katayama
- 片山 哲
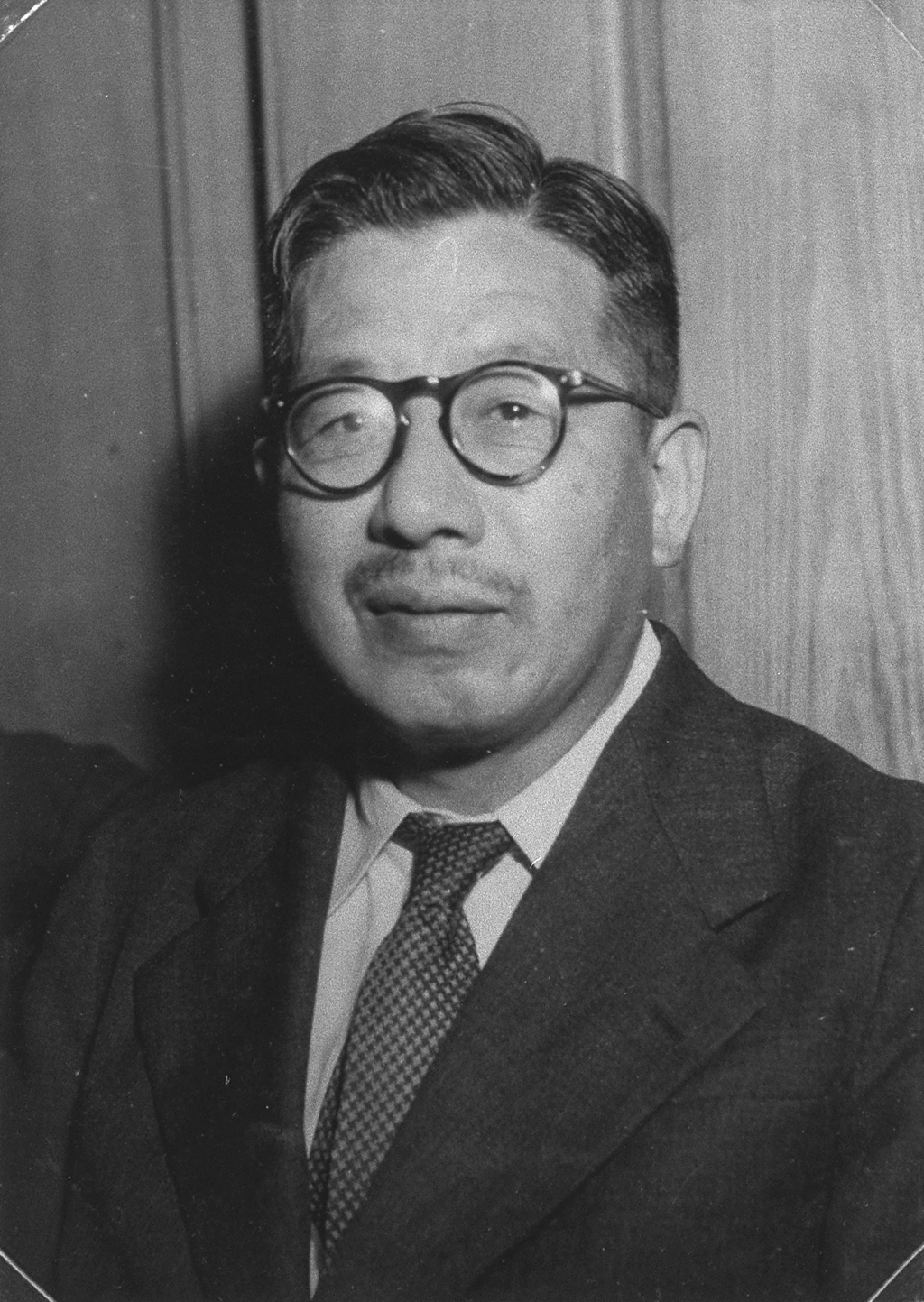
- Official portrait, 1947

Prime Minister of Japan
- In office 24 May 1947 – 10 March 1948
- Monarch: Hirohito
- Governor: Douglas MacArthur
- Deputy: Hitoshi Ashida
- Preceded by: Shigeru Yoshida
- Succeeded by: Hitoshi Ashida

Chairman of the Japan Socialist Party
- In office 28 September 1946 – 16 January 1950
- Preceded by: Position established
- Succeeded by: Mosaburō Suzuki (left wing); Jōtarō Kawakami (right wing)

Member of the House of Representatives
- In office 2 October 1952 – 23 October 1963
- Preceded by: Inosuke Nakanishi
- Succeeded by: Gōsuke Kimura
- Constituency: Kanagawa 3rd
- In office 11 April 1946 – 23 December 1948
- Preceded by: Constituency established
- Succeeded by: Inosuke Nakanishi
- Constituency: Kanagawa at-large (1946–1947); Kanagawa 3rd (1947–1948)
- In office 21 February 1936 – 30 April 1942
- Preceded by: Kisaburō Suzuki
- Succeeded by: Dennosuke Okamoto
- Constituency: Kanagawa 2nd
- In office 20 February 1930 – 21 January 1932
- Preceded by: Tokichirō Akao
- Succeeded by: Kisaburō Suzuki
- Constituency: Kanagawa 2nd

Personal details
- Born: 28 July 1887 Tanabe, Nishimuro, Wakayama Prefecture, Empire of Japan
- Died: 30 May 1978 (aged 90) Fujisawa, Kanagawa, Japan
- Party: Democratic Socialist (1960–1963)
- Other political affiliations: Social Democratic (1926–1932); Socialist Masses (1932–1940); Independent (1940–1945); Socialist (1945–1951; 1955–1960); Right Socialist (1951–1955)
- Spouse: Kikue Shimizu (m. 1913)
- Children: 5
- Relatives: Shigeo Miharu (nephew-in-law)
- Education: Tokyo Imperial University (LL.B.)
- Awards: Grand Cordon of the Order of the Rising Sun (1964); Grand Cordon of the Order of the Rising Sun with Paulownia Flowers (1978)
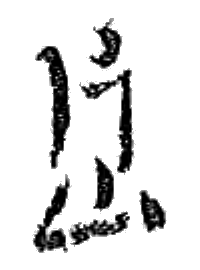
- Signature

Tetsu Katayama (片山 哲, Katayama Tetsu; 28 July 1887 – 30 May 1978) was a Japanese lawyer and politician who served as prime minister of Japan from 1947 to 1948. He was the first socialist to serve as Japanese prime minister, and the last non-member of the Liberal Democratic Party or its forerunners to serve until 1993. A devout Protestant Christian, he was a leading figure in Japanese Christian socialism.

Born in Wakayama Prefecture, Katayama graduated in law from Tokyo Imperial University in 1912. He was strongly influenced by the Christian socialism of Abe Isoo, and in the 1920s served as a legal adviser to labour organisations and socialist political parties. He helped form the Social Democratic Party in 1926 and was elected to the Diet for the first time in 1930. In 1932 his party merged into the Socialist Masses Party, from which he was expelled in 1940. After the Pacific War he became the first secretary-general of the Japan Socialist Party and later its first chairman. After the 1947 election, in which the Socialists emerged as the largest party, Katayama became prime minister at the head of a coalition cabinet with the Democratic Party and the National Cooperative Party. With the backing of occupation authorities he implemented a wide range of progressive social reforms, including the establishment of a Labour Ministry, but lacked the political strength for more radical measures and was forced to resign in 1948 after only eight months in office. He lost his Diet seat in 1949, though he remained a leading figure on the party’s right wing throughout the 1950s. From 1960 he supported the newly formed Democratic Socialist Party. He also played a prominent role in promoting Japan–China cultural exchange and the World Federalist Movement.

== Early life and education ==
Katayama was born in Tanabe (then Kamiyashiki-chō, Nishimuro District), Wakayama Prefecture, on 28 July 1887. He attended Wakayama Prefectural Tanabe Middle School (now Wakayama Prefectural Tanabe High School) and the Third Higher School (now part of Kyoto University) before entering Tokyo Imperial University, from which he graduated in law (German law course) in 1912. While a student he lodged with the family of Hiraku Toriyama, a fellow Wakayama native and lyricist of the “Warship March”. Raised in the Christian faith, he was strongly influenced by the Christian socialism of Abe Isoo. After graduating he rented a room in a YMCA dormitory and opened a “simple legal consultation office”, practising as an attorney.

== Political career ==
Katayama participated in the founding of the Social Democratic Party and became its first secretary-general in 1926. He was elected to the House of Representatives from the old Kanagawa 2nd district in the 17th general election of 1930, the first of ten non-consecutive terms. In 1932 he joined the newly formed Socialist Masses Party and served on its central executive committee. He belonged to the “social-democratic” current within the proletarian parties. In 1940, when the House voted to expel Takao Saitō for his antimilitary speech, Katayama absented himself and abstained; for this he was expelled from the Socialist Masses Party. After expulsion he briefly formed the Tōkaikai, then joined the House of Representatives Club and later the Dōkōkai led by Ichirō Hatoyama. In the 1942 Yokusan election he ran without official recommendation and was defeated.

After the war, when the Japan Socialist Party was founded in November 1945, Katayama became its first secretary-general. In September 1946 he was elected the party’s first chairman.

== Premiership (1947–1948) ==
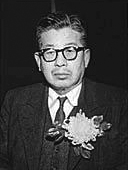
- Katayama in the mid-1950s
- Premiership of Tetsu Katayama; 24 May 1947 – 10 March 1948
- Monarch: Emperor Shōwa
- Cabinet: Katayama Cabinet
- Party: Socialist (Allied occupation)
- Election: 1947
- Seat: Naikaku Sōri Daijin Kantei
- Constituency: Kanagawa 3rd
- Emblem of the Government of Japan

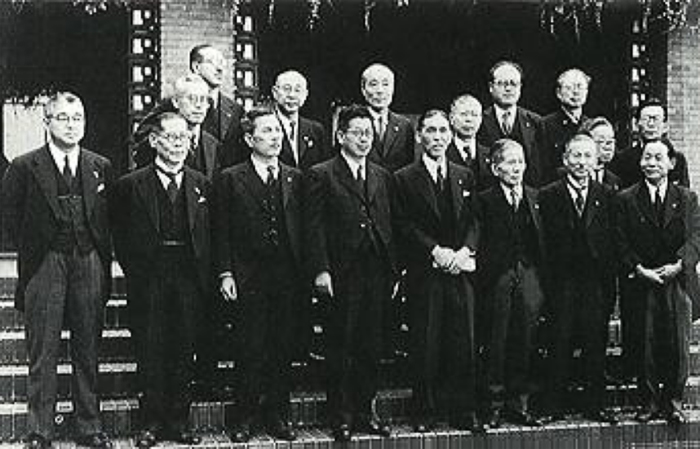
The Katayama Cabinet

In the 23rd general election of April 1947 the Japan Socialist Party won 143 seats and emerged as the largest party in the House of Representatives. In the subsequent Diet nomination vote for prime minister, Katayama received 420 votes—still the largest margin of victory in any House of Representatives prime-ministerial nomination (the second-place candidates, Shigeru Yoshida and Akira Saitō, each received only one vote). Katayama formed a coalition government with the Democratic Party and the National Cooperative Party. An earlier plan for a four-party coalition that would have included the Liberal Party was abandoned.

On 2 June 1947, in a radio address titled “Appeal to the Nation” (国民諸君に訴う), Katayama explained that he had made every effort to form a four-party national-salvation cabinet reflecting the election result and the near-unanimous Diet nomination, but that the Liberal Party had ultimately declined to join. He affirmed that the new three-party cabinet would follow a centrist course, rejecting both extreme right and extreme left and drawing a clear line against communism, while hoping for Liberal cooperation from outside the cabinet. He called for a national “spiritual revolution” comparable to the Renaissance or Reformation so that the Japanese people could fully realise the new Constitution’s principles of popular sovereignty, renunciation of war, fundamental human rights, parliamentary government, judicial independence and local autonomy. He urged shared austerity to overcome the immediate economic and food crises, stressing that those with wartime and postwar gains should bear a greater burden while honest workers would ultimately be rewarded.

In his administrative policy speech to the Diet on 1 July 1947, Katayama reiterated the government’s commitment to the new Constitution and to “high-level democracy” as the guiding principle in political, economic and social life. He diagnosed the economic crisis in detail (production at roughly 30% of pre-war levels, rising population and consumption demand, and an accelerating wage-price inflationary spiral) and outlined emergency measures on food supply, fiscal restraint, absorption of excess purchasing power, strengthened financial controls, a 30-million-ton coal production target with planned state management, labour standards legislation and unemployment relief, administrative reform (including abolition of the Home Ministry), and long-term reconstruction priorities such as hydroelectric development and trade recovery. He also stressed preparation for an early peace treaty and the faithful implementation of the Potsdam Declaration.

The Katayama Cabinet was the first cabinet headed by a Japan Socialist Party leader and the first cabinet formed under the new Constitution of Japan. Katayama’s reputation for personal integrity was high and the cabinet initially enjoyed a 68 percent approval rating. However, he had never expected to lead the country, and the conservative–socialist coalition was riven by internal disagreements from the outset; the full slate of ministers was not even decided by the day of the investiture ceremony, forcing Katayama to take the oath of office alone as a one-man cabinet. Once the cabinet was completed, pressure from the party’s left wing under Mosaburō Suzuki continued, and Katayama—generally regarded as following the guidance of GHQ—earned the nickname “Guzu-tetsu” (“Hesitant Tetsu”).

Despite its short life the government enacted a series of progressive reforms: the National Public Service Act, dissolution of the Home Ministry, police reorganisation, establishment of the Construction Board and the Ministry of Labour, introduction of unemployment insurance, thorough revision of the Civil Code that abolished the feudal family system, and revision of the Criminal Code. It also pursued nationalisation and state-control policies, creating numerous public corporations and expanding public lending on sometimes dubious fiscal grounds. The Temporary Coal Mining Control Law in particular proved highly controversial and required five months of revision before passage, accelerating the erosion of support within the ruling parties. A further crisis over the dismissal of Agriculture Minister Rikizō Hirano and the subsequent appointment of his successor led to open factional strife; the cabinet resigned after only eight months without waiting for the budget to pass.

Katayama was succeeded by Hitoshi Ashida of the Democratic Party, who continued the same coalition framework but was soon overwhelmed by the Shōden scandal and resigned. In the 24th general election of January 1949 the Socialists collapsed from 143 to 48 seats; Katayama himself finished as runner-up and lost his seat—the only instance of a sitting leader of the main opposition party losing his Diet seat until Banri Kaieda of the Democratic Party in 2014. The Japan Socialist Party split in October 1951 and Katayama stepped down as chairman.

Among the concrete measures enacted during the premiership were:

- The Labour Standards Act (September 1947), which introduced five weeks of mandatory post-natal maternity leave, prohibited dismissal during maternity leave and for thirty days thereafter, and established the principle of equal pay for equal work (though coverage was not universal).
- The Employment Security Law (November 1947), which created a nationwide system of free public employment exchanges, provided services for the disabled, and outlawed labour bosses and other undemocratic recruitment practices.
- The Child Welfare Law (December 1947), which protected abused, abandoned and neglected children, guaranteed privacy rights of children born out of wedlock, established maternal-and-child health programmes, outlawed the employment of minors in dangerous occupations, abolished indentured labour, and laid the foundation for a nationwide network of childcare centres and orphanages.
- The Law for the Elimination of Excessive Economic Concentration (December 1947) and the January 1948 measure expelling Zaibatsu-affiliated directors, which advanced the dissolution of monopolistic combines.
- Reorganisation of local government and the police, abolition of the Ministries of Home Affairs, Navy and War, extensive revision of the criminal law, and progress on land reform.

Although the cabinet was socialist-led, contemporary observers noted that it remained essentially conservative in composition and orientation. Emperor Hirohito regarded Katayama as a “good man” but “easily discouraged.”

== Later life ==
Katayama returned to the Diet in the 25th general election of 1952, topping the poll as a candidate of the Right Socialist Party. He subsequently belonged to the reunified Japan Socialist Party and, from 1960, the Democratic Socialist Party.

He maintained close ties with the People’s Republic of China. In November 1955 he led a delegation of the National Confederation for the Defense of the Constitution that met Mao Zedong and Zhou Enlai; in 1956 he became the first president of the Japan–China Cultural Exchange Association and welcomed the Peking Opera troupe led by Mei Lanfang. In 1957 he served as a representative of the Japan–China Diplomatic Relations Restoration National Conference, and in October 1959 he again met Mao as head of a Chinese National Day delegation. He also participated in the election-purification movement and the world federalist movement, serving as the second chairman of the World Federalist Japan Diet Committee.

On 24 January 1960 he joined the founding of the Democratic Socialist Party together with 38 other House of Representatives members and 16 House of Councillors members. In the 30th general election of 1963 he was defeated and retired from politics—the only former prime minister to suffer two electoral defeats.

In October 1969 Fujisawa City conferred on him its first honorary citizenship. In December 1977, through his wife Kikue, he wrote to Prime Minister Takeo Fukuda urging conclusion of the Treaty of Peace and Friendship between Japan and China.

Katayama died of old age on 30 May 1978 at the age of 90 (92 by traditional Japanese reckoning). A Christian funeral was held at his home in Fujisawa on 1 June. At the time of his death he was the oldest living former prime minister (the most senior in terms of length of time since office remained Prince Naruhiko Higashikuni).

At the end of the 1950s he also served as president of the Japan Temperance Union.

== Christian socialism ==
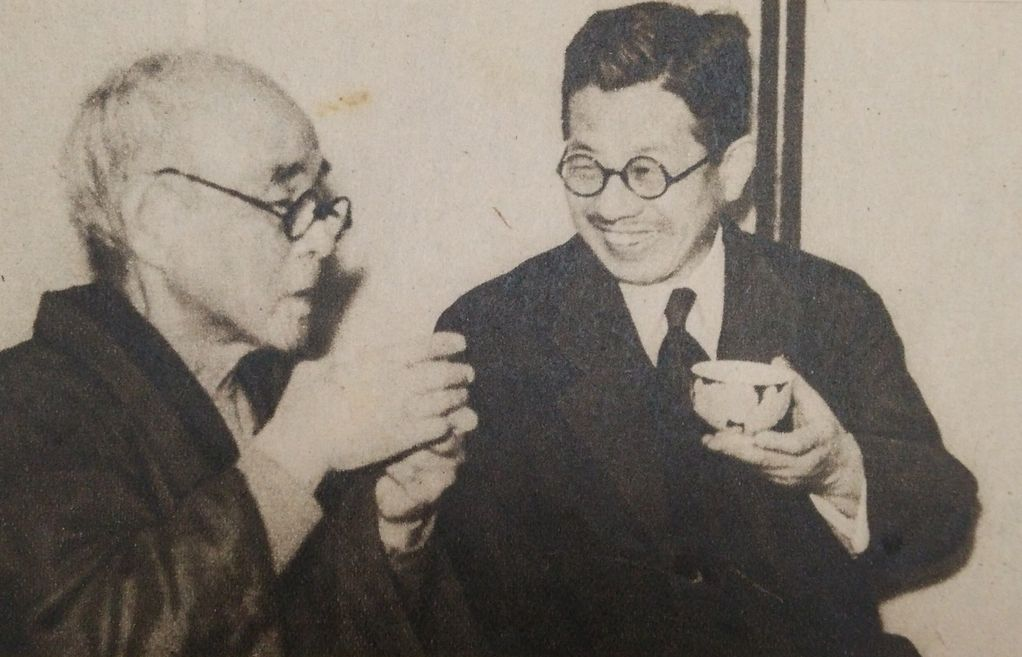
Christian socialists Abe Isso and Tetsu Katayama, 1947

A Protestant Christian belonging to the United Church of Christ in Japan Fujimi-chō Church, Katayama was one of the principal practitioners in Japan of the fusion of Christian human-rights thought and social democracy (Christian socialism). He was also the second chairman of the World Federalist Japan Diet Committee. Despite being both a Christian and a socialist he remained attached to the preservation of the imperial institution. Emperor Hirohito described him as a “good man” but “easily discouraged.”

When Katayama became prime minister, Supreme Commander Douglas MacArthur issued a statement declaring that “for the first time in history Japan is led by a man who has spent his entire life as a Christian,” placing him alongside the Christian leaders Chiang Kai-shek of China and Manuel Roxas of the Philippines.

== Writings ==
Katayama published approximately forty books and translations from the pre-war period onward. He was particularly fond of the Tang-dynasty poet Bai Juyi and issued translations in the Iwanami Shinsho and Gendai Kyōyō Bunko series. He also wrote a biography of Abe Isoo for the Mainichi Newspapers. He was an active participant in the Kanamoji-kai and other groups concerned with Japanese language and script reform.

== Family ==
- His elder sister Suzuyo married Reio Toriyama, third son of Hiraku Toriyama, through the family’s earlier lodging arrangement.
- Shigeo Miharu, a Miyagi Prefectural Assembly member and Japan Socialist Party Miyagi prefectural chairman, was a nephew-in-law.
- There was no blood relationship with the Meiji-era socialist Sen Katayama.
- Children:
  - Eldest son Jun (b. 1918) was adopted by his maternal grandfather Tokutarō.
  - Second son Tamio (1928–2014) succeeded the family line.
  - Eldest daughter Teruyo was adopted by Kakuzō Kuriu and married Yōji Kuriu.
  - Second daughter Fumiyo (b. 1922) married Kiyoshi Aochi.
  - Third daughter Sumiko (b. 1925) married Yoshio Yamamoto.

== Honours ==
- Grand Cordon of the Order of the Rising Sun (1964)
- Grand Cordon of the Order of the Rising Sun with Paulownia Flowers (1978, posthumous)
- Junior Second Rank (1978, posthumous)
- Honorary Citizen of Fujisawa (first recipient, 1969)

== In popular culture ==
- Portrayed by Minoru Chiaki in the 1977 NHK television drama series Nihon no Sengo (episode 7, “The Morning of Resignation: Nine Months of a Progressive Cabinet”).

== See also ==
- Katayama Cabinet
- Appeal to the Nation
- New Japan Construction National Movement

Political offices
Preceded by Shigeru Yoshida	Prime Minister of Japan; 1947–1948	Succeeded by Hitoshi Ashida
Preceded by Tokutarō Kimura	Minister of Justice (interim); 1947	Succeeded by Yoshio Suzuki
Preceded by Mitsujirō Ishii	Minister of Commerce and Industry; 1947	Succeeded by Chōzaburō Mizutani
Preceded by Sadayoshi Hitomatsu	Minister of Communications; 1947	Succeeded by Takeo Miki
Preceded by Tanzan Ishibashi	Minister of Finance (interim); 1947	Succeeded by Shōtarō Yano
Party political offices
Preceded by Position established	Chairman of the Japan Socialist Party; 1946–1950	Succeeded by Jōtarō Kawakami (Right); Mosaburō Suzuki (Left)
