= Appeal to the Nation =

1947 radio address and policy speech by Prime Minister Tetsu Katayama

The Appeal to the Nation (国民諸君に訴う, Kokumin shokun ni uttau, lit. “Appeal to the Gentlemen of the Nation”), also known by its full title “After Completing the Formation of the Cabinet” (組閣を了えて), was a radio address delivered by Prime Minister Tetsu Katayama on NHK on 2 June 1947. It was followed, on 1 July 1947, by his first administrative policy speech (施政方針演説) to the National Diet after the formation of the Katayama Cabinet.

The documents set out the new government’s justification for the three-party coalition, its centrist orientation, commitment to the new Constitution, diagnosis of the postwar economic and food crises, and call for national austerity and a “spiritual revolution” to realise democratic and pacifist ideals.

== Background ==
Katayama, chairman of the Japan Socialist Party, was nominated prime minister by the House of Representatives on 23 May 1947 after the Socialists emerged as the largest party in the April 1947 general election. He sought a four-party “national-salvation” cabinet including the Liberal Party, the Democratic Party and the National Cooperative Party, arguing that this reflected the election result and the near-unanimous Diet nomination. The Liberal Party ultimately declined to join, leading to a three-party coalition government that took office on 24 May (with the full cabinet completed on 1 June).

The radio address was broadcast the day after the cabinet was finalised. The administrative policy speech was delivered to the first session of the Diet under the new Constitution.

== Content ==
=== Radio address (2 June 1947) ===
Katayama explained the unsuccessful efforts to form a four-party coalition and expressed regret at the Liberal Party’s non-participation, while hoping for its cooperation from outside the cabinet. He declared that the new government would follow a centrist (“middle”) path, avoiding both extreme right and extreme left and drawing a clear line against communism.

He described politics as a moral and spiritual movement aimed at establishing the people’s happiness and building a cultural, peaceful nation. He called on the Japanese people to undergo a “spiritual revolution” comparable to the Renaissance or the Reformation in order to discard feudal and militarist ways of thinking and fully realise the new Constitution’s principles of popular sovereignty, renunciation of war, fundamental human rights, parliamentary government, judicial independence and local autonomy.

On the economic front he identified the immediate food and economic crises as the cabinet’s foremost tasks and appealed for shared sacrifice and continued austerity, especially from those who had made large wartime or postwar gains, while promising that honest workers would be rewarded. He pledged that the cabinet would overcome the difficulties and bring light both domestically and internationally. Contemporary reporting emphasised his stress on Christian morality and humanism as guiding principles.

=== Administrative policy speech (1 July 1947) ===
In the Diet speech Katayama reiterated fidelity to the new Constitution and placed “high-level democracy” at the centre of the government’s guiding principles in the political, economic and social spheres. He linked this democracy to humanism, rationalism and social democracy, and rejected violence and direct action in favour of parliamentary methods.

He presented a detailed diagnosis of the economic crisis: production at roughly 30 per cent of pre-war levels, rising population and released consumer demand, and an accelerating inflationary wage-price spiral. He outlined emergency measures on food supply, fiscal restraint, taxation of excess purchasing power, financial controls, a 30-million-ton coal production target with planned state management, labour standards legislation, unemployment relief, administrative reform (including abolition of the Home Ministry), and longer-term priorities such as hydroelectric development and trade recovery. He also stressed preparation for an early peace treaty and faithful implementation of the Potsdam Declaration.

== Significance ==
The address and speech constituted the first major public statements of Japan’s first Socialist-led cabinet and the first cabinet formed under the 1947 Constitution. They emphasised moral and Christian-influenced language of “spiritual revolution,” humanism and shared sacrifice alongside concrete crisis-management measures. Contemporary English-language reporting noted Katayama’s stress on Christian morality and humanism as guiding principles for the new democratic government.

The documents are preserved in published collections of Japan Socialist Party materials and in the official Diet record. The policy speech text is also available through modern databases of prime-ministerial addresses.

== See also ==
- Katayama Cabinet
- Tetsu Katayama
- New Japan Construction National Movement
- Japan Socialist Party Platform (1945)
- Constitution of Japan
