= Tamaki Uemura =

Japanese pastor

- 植村環
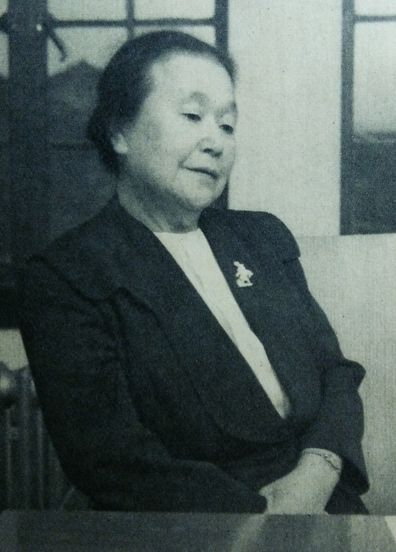
- Uemura Tamaki, from a 1955 photograph
- Born: August 24, 1890; Tokyo
- Died: May 26, 1982; Tokyo
- Occupation(s): Pastor, YWCA executive
- Parent: Uemura Masahisa

Tamaki Uemura (植村環) (August 24, 1890 – May 26, 1982) was a YWCA executive, pacifist, and Christian pastor in Japan.

== Early life ==
Uemura was born in Tokyo, the daughter of Masahisa Uemura and Sueno Yamanouchi. Her father was a prominent Presbyterian minister. She attended a women's college in Tokyo, then Wellesley College in Massachusetts from 1911 to 1915, on a four-year scholarship. Later, after her father, son, and husband had all died, she studied theology at the University of Edinburgh, from 1925 to 1929.

== Career ==
Uemura was appointed as the national director of the YWCA in Japan in 1937, and she served as the vice-director of the International YWCA from 1938 to 1951. In 1934, she became one of the first women ordained as a Christian pastor in Japan. She taught at Tsuda College and other institutions, and was principal of the Tainan Presbyterian Girls' School in Taiwan in the 1930s. During World War II, she was the only female member of the executive committee of the United Church of Christ in Japan. Under the United States' occupation of Japan immediately after the war, she was known for her stance as a prostitution abolitionist.

In 1946, Uemura became the first Japanese civilian to visit the United States after the war, when she accepted an invitation from a national women's organization in the United Presbyterian Church. She toured speaking at local churches across the United States. Her appearances sparked a controversy over the question of women serving Communion, and renewed calls for ordination for women pastors in the American denomination. From 1947 to 1951, she taught weekly Bible lessons for the Japanese imperial household, including Empress Masako. In 1954 she wrote an open letter to Mamie Eisenhower, advocating for the United States to pay compensation to the Japanese victims of hydrogen bomb testing in the Pacific. "I sincerely wish you and President Eisenhower, who are Christians, will forgive this rude letter," she wrote. She was a member of the Committee of Seven in 1956, encouraging Japan's admission to the United Nations as a "stepping stone away from reliance upon force and armaments toward a world of law, justice, and disarmament." In 1961, she was one of the world leaders who signed an international call for a "world constitution" for peace. She was decorated with the Second Class of the Order of the Sacred Treasure in 1965. She retired from pastoral duties in 1973.

== Personal life ==
Uemura married Shuzo Kawado in 1918; they had daughter, Machiko, and a son. She was widowed very young, and her son died from polio in 1923. Uemura died in 1982, in Tokyo, aged 91 years.
