= Kyoto 3rd district (1928–1942) =

Former Japan House of Representatives constituency

Kyōto 3rd district was a multi-member constituency of the House of Representatives in the Imperial Diet of Japan. Between 1928 and 1942 it elected three representatives by single non-transferable vote (SNTV). It covered Northwestern parts of Kyōto, namely the Amata, Ikaruga, Kaya, Yosa, Naka, Takeno and Kumano counties. The district was then predominantly rural; but the Minseitō could win the district by two seats to one in the election of 1930 and in the immediate prewar elections of 1936 and 1937 when the Diet had already lost most of its influence to the military- and aristocracy-led "national unity" cabinets. In the wartime election of 1942, non-Yokusankai candidate Hitoshi Ashida received more than 15,000 votes and defended his seat by a 1,500 vote margin against fourth-ranking Yokusankai candidate San'ichirō Mizushima.

Following the 1946 redistricting, the area became part of the limited voting Kyoto At-large district.

== Elected Representatives ==
election year	highest vote (top tōsen) (1930, 1937: no vote)	2nd (1930, 1937: no vote)	3rd (1930, 1937: no vote)
1928	Isuke Yoshimura (Seiyūkai)	Kunikichi Murakami (Minseitō)	San'ichirō Mizushima (Seiyūkai)
1930	Takeshi Tsuhara (Minseitō)	Kunikichi Murakami (Minseitō)	San'ichirō Mizushima (Seiyūkai)
1932	Momozō Nagata (Seiyūkai)	Hitoshi Ashida (Seiyūkai)	San'ichirō Mizushima (Seiyūkai)
1936	Takeshi Tsuhara (Minseitō)	Kunikichi Murakami (Minseitō)	Hitoshi Ashida (Seiyūkai)
1937	Hitoshi Ashida (Seiyūkai) (Note: sided with the Kuhara-Hatoyama-led "orthodox faction" (seitō-ha; the liberal, anti-military wing of the party) in the Seiyūkai split of 1939, joined Hatoyama's Dōkōkai in 1941)	Takeshi Tsuhara (Minseitō)	Kunikichi Murakami (Minseitō)
1942	Keijirō Okada (Yokusan Seijitaisei Kyōgikai)	Kunikichi Murakami (Yokusan Seijitaisei Kyōgikai)	Hitoshi Ashida (Ex-Seiyūkai Independent)

Party affiliations as of election day. In 1930 and 1937, there were only three candidates for the three seats who were thus elected without vote.
