= Japan Cooperative Party =

Japan Cooperative Party (Japanese: 日本協同党, Nihon Kyōdōtō) may refer to:

- Japan Cooperative Party (1945–46)
- Japan Cooperative Party (1946–47)
