= Kisaburō Suzuki =

Because Japanese names historically begin with the surname, the position of the names in these listings differ. Both persons however have the same surname.

Kisaburō Suzuki may refer to two persons:

- Suzuki Kisaburō (1867–1940), Japanese statesman
- Kisaburō Suzuki (musician) (1953— ), Japanese musician and songwriter
