= Forum for Peace, Human Rights and the Environment =

- フォーラム平和・人権・環境
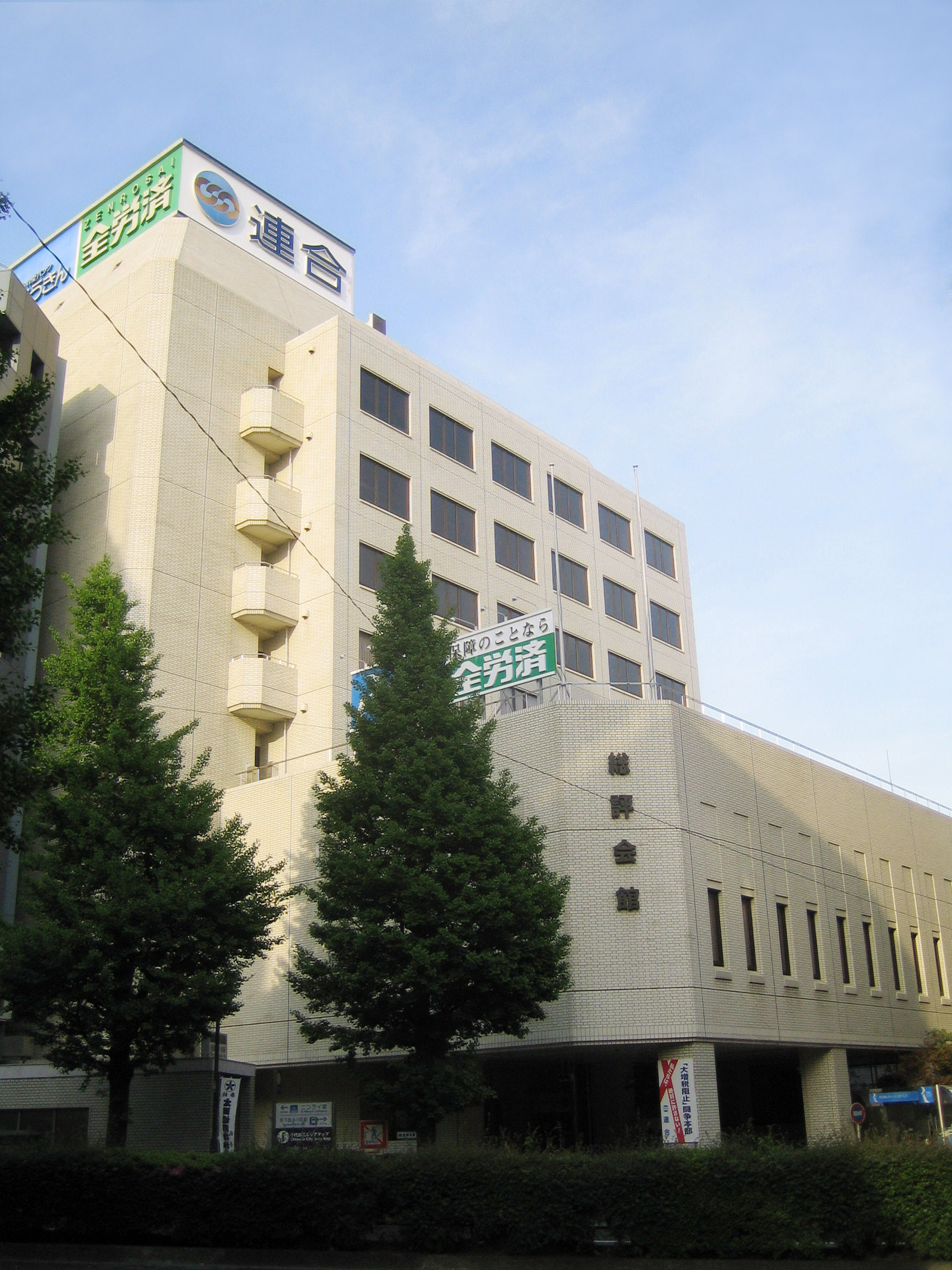
- Rengo Kaikan, where the Peace Forum is located
- Formation: October 22, 1999
- Type: Peace movement organization
- Location(s): Japan 〒101-0062; 1F Rengo Kaikan, 3-2-11 Kanda-Surugadai, Chiyoda, Tokyo
- Origins: National Confederation for the Defense of the Constitution
- Members: 32 central organizations and local organizations
- Website: www.peace-forum.com

The Forum for Peace, Human Rights and the Environment (Japanese: フォーラム平和・人権・環境, Hepburn: Fōramu Heiwa Jinken Kankyō) is a Japanese civic organization. It is commonly abbreviated as the Peace Forum (平和フォーラム, Heiwa Fōramu). This article also covers its predecessor, the National Confederation for the Defense of the Constitution (憲法擁護国民連合, Kenpō Yōgo Kokumin Rengō; abbreviated as Goken Rengo).

== Overview ==
The organization focuses primarily on peace movements, human rights movements including the Buraku liberation movement, and environmental movements such as campaigns against synthetic detergents. In cooperation with its affiliate organization, the Japan Congress Against A- and H-Bombs (Gensuikin), it also engages in movements for the abolition of nuclear weapons and the phase-out of nuclear power. It publishes a monthly newsletter titled Newspaper.

== History ==
=== Formation of the National Confederation for the Defense of the Constitution ===
The predecessor of the Peace Forum, the National Confederation for the Defense of the Constitution (Goken Rengo), was formed in 1954 by 144 organizations, including the Left Socialist Party, the Right Socialist Party, the Labourers and Farmers Party, and the General Council of Trade Unions of Japan (Sōhyō), to unify previously divided constitutional defense groups ahead of the reunification of the left and right Socialist parties in 1955. The founding convention was also attended by 136 invited organizations, including trade unions affiliated with Sōhyō, religious groups, and civic organizations.

=== Unification of the Socialist Party and the split with the Democratic Socialist Party and the New Constitutional Defense group ===
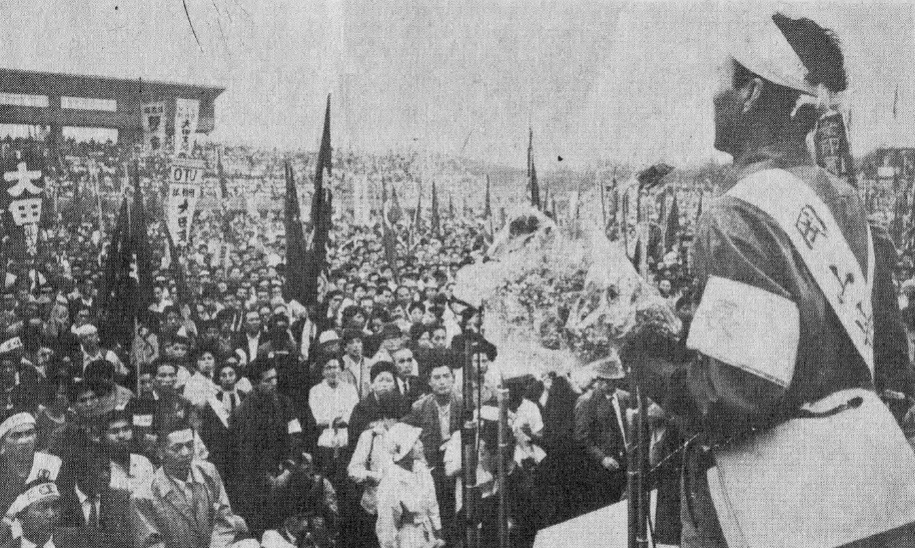
A demonstration organized primarily by the National Confederation for the Defense of the Constitution and others in 1964.

Following the formation of Goken Rengo, the Socialist Party was unified in 1955. That year also saw the beginning of the Sunagawa Struggle, in which the newly formed Goken Rengo cooperated with the Tokyo Local Council of Trade Unions and others to support local residents. In 1957, the Labourers and Farmers Party also merged into the Socialist Party, temporarily unifying Socialist-aligned forces. Goken Rengo actively participated in the Anpo protests of 1959–1960. However, disputes over these protests and other issues led to the split of the Democratic Socialist Party from the Socialist Party in 1960. On the constitutional defense front, Democratic Socialist-aligned forces formed the New National Conference for the Defense of the Constitution (New Goken) and left Goken Rengo. The New Goken later became the Constitutional Discussion Conference and is now the Constitutional Creation Conference, a pro-revision organization. After this split, the main constitutional defense organizations in Japan were Goken Rengo, New Goken, and the Liaison Conference of Various Circles to Prevent Constitutional Revision (Kenpō Kaigi).

=== Activities under the 1955 System ===
Even after the New Goken split, Goken Rengo maintained a stable organization. Under the 1955 System, it supported progressive forces centered on the Socialist Party. It also cooperated with Sōhyō, the Central Labor-Farmer-Citizen Conference to Protect Food, Greenery and Water, Gensuikin, and others in local anti-war struggles, pollution issues, and anti-nuclear movements.

=== Establishment of the Peace Forum ===
From the 1980s to the 1990s, moves toward integration among cooperating organizations gained momentum.

In 1992, Goken Rengo opened a joint office with the Japan Congress Against A- and H-Bombs (Gensuikin). On 22 October 1999, the Central Labor-Farmer-Citizen Conference to Protect Food, Greenery and Water merged into Goken Rengo, and Gensuikin joined as an organizational member, forming the Peace Forum.

In the labor movement, unification efforts also progressed in the 1980s. With the establishment of the Japanese Trade Union Confederation (Rengō) in 1987, the previous national centers, Sōhyō, Dōmei, Chūritsu Rōren, and Shinsanbetsu, were dissolved. After its dissolution, Sōhyō established the Sōhyō Center to continue some of its activities; however, as the Sōhyō Center was intended to be temporary, movements previously led by Sōhyō were transferred to the Peace Forum after the Center’s dissolution. Some former Sōhyō-affiliated unions and certain Shinsanbetsu-affiliated unions joined the Peace Forum directly after the dissolution of their former centers. Additionally, some prefectural councils (Kenpyō) and district labor councils (Chiku Rō), which had been lower organizations of Sōhyō, did not dissolve but changed their names and became local organizations of the Peace Forum or bodies coordinating labor unions within it. Consequently, the Peace Forum and its local organizations are sometimes regarded as labor organizations. However, some organizations that had belonged to these labor groups, such as the Information Industry Trade Union Federation (Jōhō Rōren), which had been affiliated with Sōhyō, did not join the Peace Forum, while some unions that did not join Rengō and instead affiliated with the National Trade Union Council (Zenrōkyō) or similar bodies, such as the National Railway Workers' Union (Kokurō) and the National General Workers' Union National Council, did join the Peace Forum.

=== From political realignment to the present ===
The Socialist Party, which had maintained friendly relations with Goken Rengo, changed its name to the Social Democratic Party in 1996, from which the Democratic Party then split. The Peace Forum established friendly relations with both parties that inherited the Socialist Party’s lineage. In 2015, regarding the Legislation for Peace and Security submitted to the Diet by the Cabinet, the Peace Forum regarded it as “war legislation” and became a core member of the Committee of 1,000 Against War, working with many of its affiliated labor unions, some of which had previously parted ways, as well as labor unions affiliated with the National Confederation of Trade Unions (Zenrōren) and others to oppose it. It has taken a proactive stance toward the subsequent citizens’ and opposition parties’ joint struggle, and many of the labor unions participating in the Peace Forum also support opposition party cooperation.

== Relations with political parties ==
Many of its member organizations support the Constitutional Democratic Party of Japan and the Social Democratic Party, and the Peace Forum itself often takes a favorable attitude toward these parties. The local organization in Okinawa Prefecture, the Okinawa Peace Movement Center, includes the Okinawa Prefectural Federation of the Social Democratic Party as well as the Okinawa Social Mass Party.

== Member organizations ==
- All-Japan Prefectural and Municipal Workers' Union (Jichirō)
- Japan Teachers' Union (Nikkyōso)
- General Federation of Private Railway Workers' Unions of Japan (Shitetsu Sōren)
- All Japan Federation of National Agricultural and Forestry Workers' Unions (Zennōrin)
- All Japan Water Supply Workers' Union (Zensuidō)
- All Japan Federation of Forest, Forestry and Wood-Related Industry Workers' Unions (Shinrin Rōren)
- National Federation of Automobile Transport Workers' Unions (Zenjikō Rōren)
- Japan Broadcasting Labour Union (Nippōrō)
- Federation of Government-Related Corporation Workers' Unions (Seirōren)
- All Printing Bureau Workers' Union (Zeninatsu)
- National Railway Workers' Union (Kokurō)
- All Japan Dockworkers' Union (Zenkōwan)
- All Japan Construction and Transport Solidarity Union (Zen-Nichiken)
- Small and Medium-Sized Labor Unions Policy Network (Chūshō Net)
- New Industrial Federation Drivers' Union (Shin Unten)
- Healthcare Workers' Union Council (Healthcare Rōkyō)
- All Petroleum General Petroleum Workers' Union (Zen Sekiyu General Sekiyu Rōso)
- National Community Union Federation (Zenkoku Union)
- All Origin Workers' Union Council (Origin Rōkyō)
- National General Workers' Union National Council (Zenkoku Ippan Zenkoku-kyō)
- All Japan Federation of Farmers' Unions (Zen-Nichinō)
- Buraku Liberation League
- I Women's Conference
- Solidarity Network with Migrants Japan (Ijūren)
- Japan Socialist Youth League (Shaseidō)
- Japan Music Council (Nichionkyō)
- Local Public Employees' Retirees' Council (Chikōtai)
- Sōhyō Retirees' Association (Sōhyō OB Kai)
- Petroleum Workers' Unions Liaison Council (Sekiyu Rōso Ren)
- Social Culture Legal Center (Shabun Center)
- Consumers Union of Japan (Nisshōren)
- Union Net Peace Center (Union Heiwa)
- National Network of Occupational Safety and Health Centers (Zenkoku Anzen Center)
- Japan Congress Against A- and H-Bombs (Gensuikin)

== Local organizations ==
- Hokkaido Peace Movement Forum
- Aomori Prefecture Peace Promotion Trade Union Conference
- Peace and Environment Iwate Prefecture Center
- Akita Prefecture Peace Center
- Miyagi Prefecture Constitutional Defense and Peace Center
- Yamagata Prefecture Peace Center
- Fukushima Prefecture Peace Forum
- Ibaraki Peace Defense Prefectural Citizens' Conference
- Tochigi Prefecture Peace Movement Center
- Gunma Prefecture Peace Movement Center
- Saitama Prefecture Peace Movement Center
- Constitutional Defense and Gensuikin Chiba Prefecture Executive Committee
- Tokyo Peace Movement Center
- Kanagawa Peace Movement Center
- Niigata Prefecture Peace Movement Center
- Yamanashi Prefecture Peace Center
- Toyama Prefecture Peace Movement Center
- Ishikawa Prefecture Peace Movement Center
- Nagano Prefecture Peace, Human Rights and Environment Trade Union Conference
- Forum Gifu
- Shizuoka Prefecture Peace and National Movement Center
- Aichi Peace Forum
- Forum Peace Mie
- Fukui Prefecture Peace, Environment and Human Rights Center
- Shiga Prefectural Citizens' Peace and Human Rights Movement Center
- Kyoto Peace Forum
- Osaka Peace and Human Rights Center
- Forum for Peace, Human Rights and the Environment Hyogo
- Nara Peace Forum
- Wakayama Prefecture Peace Forum
- Constitutional Defense, Peace and Human Rights Forum Tottori Prefecture
- Forum for Peace, Human Rights and the Environment Shimane
- Okayama Prefecture Peace, Human Rights and Environment Trade Union Conference
- Hiroshima Prefecture Peace Movement Center
- Yamaguchi Prefecture Peace Movement Forum
- Kagawa Prefecture Trade Union Conference to Defend Peace and Democracy
- Tokushima Human Rights and Peace Movement Center
- Ehime Prefecture Peace Movement Center
- Kochi Prefecture Peace Movement Center
- Peace, Human Rights and Environment Fukuoka Prefecture Forum
- Saga Prefecture Peace Movement Center
- Nagasaki Prefecture Peace Movement Center
- Kumamoto 21 Trade Union Conference
- Oita Prefecture Peace Movement Center
- Miyazaki Prefecture Peace, Human Rights and Environment Trade Union Conference
- Kagoshima Prefecture Constitutional Defense and Peace Forum
- Okinawa Peace Movement Center

== See also ==
- United front
- Japanese Trade Union Confederation
- General Council of Trade Unions of Japan
- Japan Socialist Party
- Constitutional Democratic Party of Japan
- Social Democratic Party (Japan)
