= Uemura Masahisa =

Japanese Christian pastor (1858–1925)

- 植村 正久
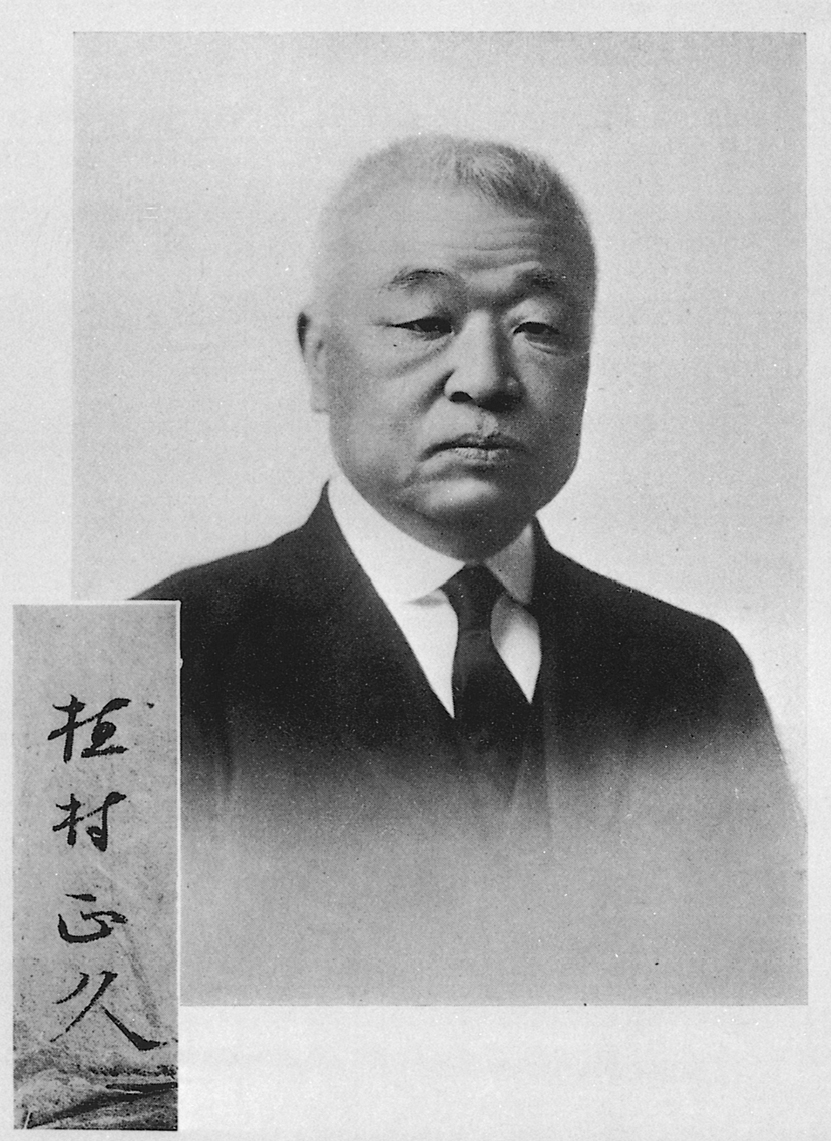
- Born: 15 January 1858
- Died: 8 January 1925 (aged 66); Tokyo, Japan
- Occupation(s): Pastor, theologian, critic
- Children: 3, including Tamaki Uemura

Uemura Masahisa (植村 正久; 15 January 1858 – 8 January 1925) was a Japanese Christian pastor, theologian and critic of Meiji and Taishō periods.

== Early life and education ==
Uemura was the eldest son of Tojuiro and Tei, of the family of hatamoto (rank of samurai). His birth name was Michitarō. Though his family was wealthy, they fell into bankruptcy at the time of the Meiji Restoration. He came into contact with Christianity when he went to Tokyo to study at Shubunkan and the preparatory school run by James Hamilton Ballagh. In June 1873, he was baptized at the Yokohama Public Church by Ballagh. His parents and younger brothers were also baptized later. Soon he decided to become an evangelist, studying at Brown Preparatory School and Icchi Shin Gakko (United Seminary).

== Career ==
Uemura was ordained in 1880 and became the pastor of Shitaya (Toshimagaoka) church. In 1887, he established the church that would later become Fujimicho Church and served as pastor there for the rest of his life. As an evangelist, his work included: 1. forming evangelical churches; 2. building up an acceptance of a theological way of thinking and the related training of evangelists; and 3. participation in written campaigns opposing many movements in Japanese society (especially the Rescript on Education of 1890).

In a life of faith that began in the Public Church and moved to the Japan Presbyterian Church, he provided directional leadership to bring the Christian churches together and help them become self-supporting and independent, based on an evangelical faith (Jesus as the Son of God incarnate, offering redemption through his death on the cross; the resurrection and ascension). Defying the influence of theological liberalism, he, as a professor at Meiji Gakuin, worked to solidify a faith with the above doctrine as its core. In addition, as one of the founders of Tokyo Shingakusha (seminary), he took on the responsibility of the theological education and training of evangelists. Through his own publications, such as Nihon-hyōron (Japanese Criticism), Fukuin-shūhō (The Evangelical Weekly) and others, he engaged in a wide range of literary criticism on such subjects as politics, society, education and religion. His contributions in the areas of Bible translation (into Japanese), hymn editing, literary criticism, and English literature are also of note.

== Personal life ==
Uemura married Sueno Yamanouchi. They had three daughters; the third, Tamaki Uemura, survived to adulthood and became a religious leader in her own right. Uemura's health was greatly damaged because of the strenuous effort he put into the reconstruction of Fujimicho Church and Tokyo Shingakusha after they were devastated by the 1923 Great Kantō earthquake. He died suddenly at his home in Kashiwagi, Tokyo.
