= Ashida cabinet =

Cabinet of Japan (March–October 1948)

Ashida Cabinet
- 47th Cabinet of Japan

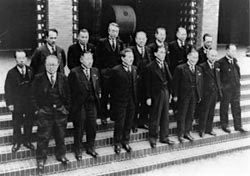
- Date formed: March 10, 1948
- Date dissolved: October 15, 1948

People and organisations
- Emperor: Hirohito
- Prime Minister: Hitoshi Ashida
- Deputy Prime Minister: Suehiro Nishio (until July 6, 1948)
- Member parties: (Allied occupation); Japan Socialist Party; Democratic Party; National Cooperative Party
- Status in legislature: Majority (coalition)
- Opposition parties: Liberal Party; Japanese Communist Party; Japan Farmers Party

History
- Legislature term: 2nd-3rd National Diet
- Predecessor: Katayama Cabinet
- Successor: Second Yoshida Cabinet

The Ashida Cabinet is the 47th Cabinet of Japan headed by Hitoshi Ashida from 10 March to 15 October 1948, during the Allied occupation.

== Cabinet ==
Portfolio	Name	Political party	Term start	Term end
Prime Minister	Hitoshi Ashida	Democratic	March 10, 1948	October 15, 1948
Minister of State Deputy Prime Minister	Suehiro Nishio	Socialist	March 10, 1948	July 6, 1948
Attorney General	Suzuki Yoshio	Socialist	March 10, 1948	October 15, 1948
Minister for Foreign Affairs	Hitoshi Ashida	Democratic	March 10, 1948	October 15, 1948
Minister of Finance	Kitamura Tokutarō	Democratic	March 10, 1948	October 15, 1948
Minister of Education	Morito Tatsuo	Socialist	March 10, 1948	October 15, 1948
Minister of Health	Takeda Giichi	Democratic	March 10, 1948	October 15, 1948
Minister of Agriculture, Forestry and Fisheries	Nagae Kazuo	Socialist	March 10, 1948	October 15, 1948
Minister of Commerce and Industry	Mizutani Chōzaburō	Socialist	March 10, 1948	October 15, 1948
Minister of Transport	Okada Seiichi	National Cooperative	March 10, 1948	October 15, 1948
Minister of Communications	Tomiyoshi Eiji	Socialist	March 10, 1948	October 15, 1948
Minister of Labor	Katō Kanjū	Socialist	March 10, 1948	October 15, 1948
Minister of State Director-General of the Economic Stabilization Board Chair of the Price Board Director of the Central Economic Research Agency	Takeo Kurusu	Democratic	March 10, 1948	October 2, 1948
Minister of State Director-General of the Economic Stabilization Board Chair of the Price Board Director of the Central Economic Research Agency	Hitoshi Ashida (acting)	Democratic	October 2, 1948	October 15, 1948
Minister of State President of the Administrative Research Board (until July 1, 1948) Director of the Administrative Management Agency (from July 1, 1948) Director-General of the Board of Reparations	Funada Kyōji	National Cooperative	March 10, 1948	October 15, 1948
Minister of State President of the Construction Board	Hitotsumatsu Sadayoshi	Democratic	March 10, 1948	July 10, 1948
Minister of Construction	Hitotsumatsu Sadayoshi	Democratic	July 10, 1948	October 15, 1948
Minister of State Chairman of the Local Finance Committee	Nomizo Masaru	Socialist	March 10, 1948	October 15, 1948
Minister of State Chief Cabinet Secretary	Tomabechi Gizō	Democratic	March 10, 1948	October 15, 1948
Deputy Chief Cabinet Secretary	Kiichi Arita	Democratic	March 15, 1948	October 15, 1948
Deputy Chief Cabinet Secretary	Fukushima Shintarō	Independent	March 15, 1948	October 15, 1948
