= Kanagawa 2nd district (1928–1942) =

Former multi-member constituency of the Japanese House of Representatives

Kanagawa 2nd district (Japanese: 神奈川県第2区, romanized: Kanagawa-ken dai-2-ku) was a multi-member constituency of the House of Representatives in the Imperial Diet of Japan. It was used from the 16th general election in 1928 to the 21st general election in 1942. Throughout its existence it elected four members by single non-transferable vote.

== Area ==
Municipal names are as of the 21st general election in 1942.

- Yokosuka
- Kawasaki
- Kamakura
- Miura District
- Kamakura District

== Elected representatives ==
Election year	Highest vote (top tōsen)	2nd	3rd	4th
1928	Ono Shigeyuki (Rikken Minseitō)	Koizumi Matajirō (Rikken Minseitō)	Akao Tōkichirō (Rikken Seiyūkai)	Kawaguchi Yoshihisa (Rikken Seiyūkai)
1930	Koizumi Matajirō (Rikken Minseitō)	Ono Shigeyuki (Rikken Minseitō)	Kawaguchi Yoshihisa (Rikken Seiyūkai)	Tetsu Katayama (Shakai Minshūtō)
1932	Kawaguchi Yoshihisa (Rikken Seiyūkai)	Suzuki Kisaburō (Rikken Seiyūkai)	Koizumi Matajirō (Rikken Minseitō)	Iwakiri Shigeo (Rikken Minseitō)
1936	Koizumi Matajirō (Rikken Minseitō)	Tetsu Katayama (Shakai Taishūtō)	Kawaguchi Yoshihisa (Rikken Seiyūkai)	Noda Takeo (Rikken Minseitō)
1937	Koizumi Matajirō (Rikken Minseitō)	Tetsu Katayama (Shakai Taishūtō)	Ogushi Seiichi (Rikken Seiyūkai)	Noguchi Kiichi (Rikken Seiyūkai)
1942	Koizumi Matajirō (Yokusan Seijitaisei Kyōgikai recommendation)	Noguchi Kiichi (Yokusan Seijitaisei Kyōgikai recommendation)	Noda Takeo (Yokusan Seijitaisei Kyōgikai recommendation)	Okamoto Dennosuke (Yokusan Seijitaisei Kyōgikai recommendation)

== Election results ==
Official recommendation (kōnin): endorsed by the candidate's party.

=== 1942 (21st general election) ===
Rank	Candidate	Status	Votes	Notes
1	Koizumi Matajirō	Incumbent	22,294	Yokusan Seijitaisei Kyōgikai recommendation
2	Noguchi Kiichi	Incumbent	20,260	Yokusan Seijitaisei Kyōgikai recommendation
3	Noda Takeo	Former	20,086	Yokusan Seijitaisei Kyōgikai recommendation
4	Okamoto Dennosuke	New	19,213	Yokusan Seijitaisei Kyōgikai recommendation
5	Tetsu Katayama	Incumbent	13,983	
6	Uemori Kotetsu	New	4,682	

=== 1937 (20th general election) ===
Rank	Candidate	Party	Status	Votes	Notes
1	Koizumi Matajirō	Rikken Minseitō	Incumbent	19,269	Official
2	Tetsu Katayama	Shakai Taishūtō	Incumbent	18,800	Official
3	Ogushi Seiichi	Rikken Seiyūkai	New	12,809	Official
4	Noguchi Kiichi	Rikken Seiyūkai	New	11,907	Official
5	Noda Takeo	Rikken Minseitō	New	11,510	Official
6	Suyama Tokutarō	Dai Nippon Seinen Tō	New	5,691	Official

=== 1936 (19th general election) ===
Rank	Candidate	Party	Status	Votes	Notes
1	Koizumi Matajirō	Rikken Minseitō	Incumbent	22,173	Official
2	Tetsu Katayama	Shakai Taishūtō	Former	19,382	Official
3	Kawaguchi Yoshihisa	Rikken Seiyūkai	Incumbent	16,269	Official
4	Noda Takeo	Rikken Minseitō	New	15,894	Official
5	Suzuki Kisaburō	Rikken Seiyūkai	Incumbent	14,437	Official
6	Morita Sadaki	Meirinkai	New	2,028	
7	Kaneko Yūrin	Independent	New	659	

=== 1932 (18th general election) ===
Rank	Candidate	Party	Status	Votes	Notes
1	Kawaguchi Yoshihisa	Rikken Seiyūkai	Incumbent	20,536	Official
2	Suzuki Kisaburō	Rikken Seiyūkai	New	19,666	Official
3	Koizumi Matajirō	Rikken Minseitō	Incumbent	15,211	Official
4	Iwakiri Shigeo	Rikken Minseitō	Former	9,865	Official
5	Tetsu Katayama	Shakai Minshūtō	Incumbent	9,164	
6	Ishikawa Jūrō	Rikken Minseitō	New	5,456	Official

=== 1930 (17th general election) ===
Rank	Candidate	Party	Status	Votes	Notes
1	Koizumi Matajirō	Rikken Minseitō	Incumbent	17,937	Official
2	Ono Shigeyuki	Rikken Minseitō	Incumbent	16,609	Official
3	Kawaguchi Yoshihisa	Rikken Seiyūkai	Incumbent	14,818	Official
4	Tetsu Katayama	Shakai Minshūtō	New	14,593	Official
5	Akao Tōkichirō	Rikken Seiyūkai	Incumbent	7,853	Official
6	Nakamura Fumio	Rikken Seiyūkai	New	2,593	
7	Nagato Yōzō	Independent	New	273	

=== 1928 (16th general election) ===
Rank	Candidate	Party	Status	Votes	Notes
1	Ono Shigeyuki	Rikken Minseitō	Incumbent	14,388	Official
2	Koizumi Matajirō	Rikken Minseitō	Incumbent	13,768	Official
3	Akao Tōkichirō	Rikken Seiyūkai	New	12,355	Official
4	Kawaguchi Yoshihisa	Rikken Seiyūkai	New	12,326	Official
5	Kawashima Fujirō	Independent	New	8,315	
6	Tetsu Katayama	Shakai Minshūtō	New	5,841	Official
