= Hitoshi Ashida =

Prime Minister of Japan in 1948

Junior Second Rank Hitoshi Ashida
- 芦田 均
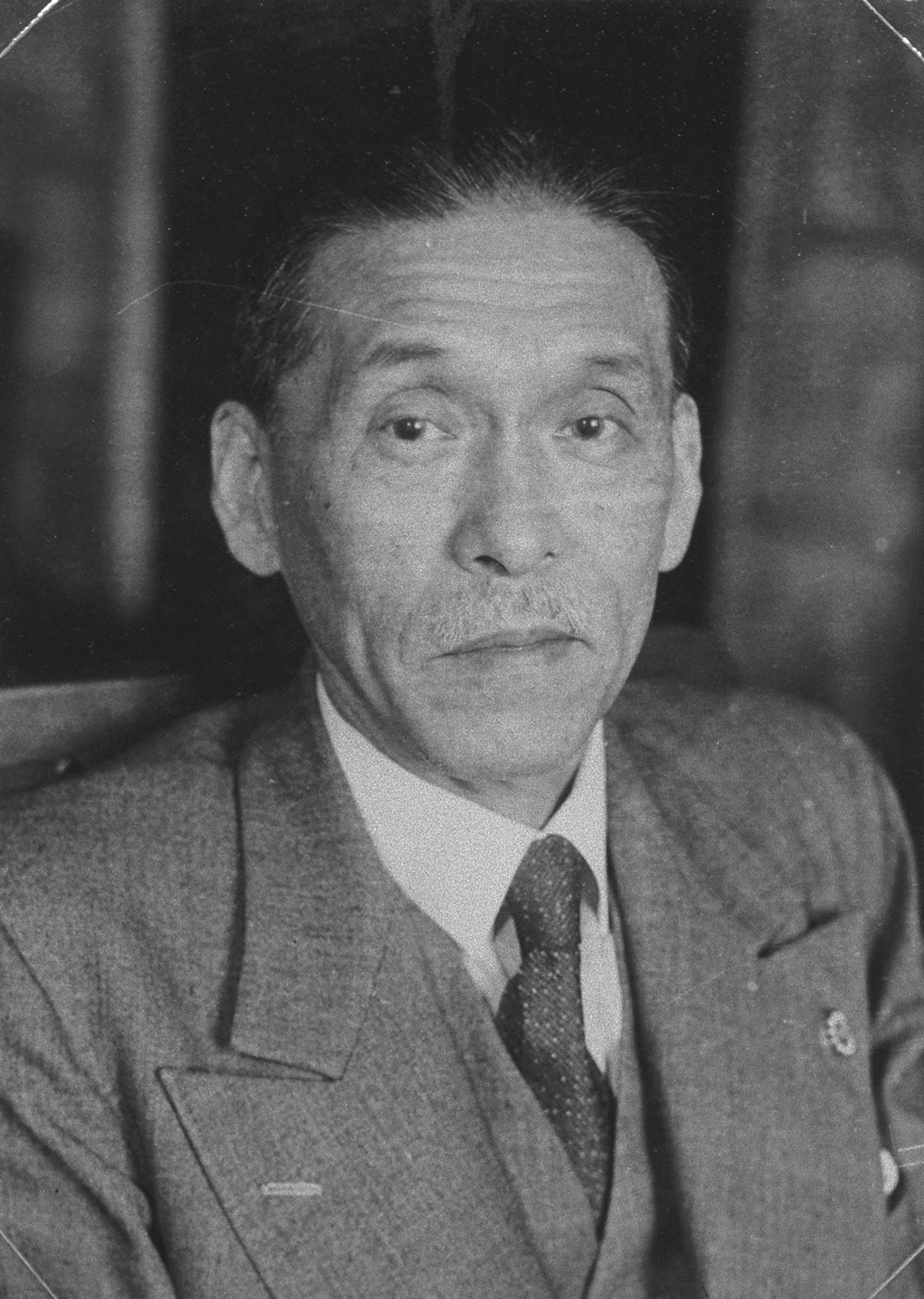
- Official portrait, 1948

Prime Minister of Japan
- In office 10 March 1948 – 15 October 1948
- Monarch: Hirohito
- Governor: Douglas MacArthur
- Deputy: Suehiro Nishio
- Preceded by: Tetsu Katayama
- Succeeded by: Shigeru Yoshida

Deputy Prime Minister of Japan
- In office 1 June 1947 – 10 March 1948
- Prime Minister: Tetsu Katayama
- Preceded by: Kijūrō Shidehara
- Succeeded by: Suehiro Nishio

President of the Democratic Party
- In office 18 May 1947 – 16 December 1948
- Preceded by: Position established
- Succeeded by: Takeru Inukai
Ministerial offices
Minister for Foreign Affairs
In office 1 June 1947 – 15 October 1948
Prime Minister	Tetsu Katayama; Himself
Preceded by	Tetsu Katayama (acting)
Succeeded by	Shigeru Yoshida
Minister of Health and Welfare
In office 9 October 1945 – 22 May 1946
Prime Minister	Kijūrō Shidehara
Preceded by	Kenzō Matsumura
Succeeded by	Yoshinari Kawai

Member of the House of Representatives
- In office 21 February 1932 – 20 June 1959
- Preceded by: Kunikichi Murakami
- Succeeded by: Sen'ichi Tanigaki
- Constituency: Kyoto 3rd (1932–1946); Kyoto at-large (1946–1947); Kyoto 2nd (1947–1959)

Personal details
- Born: 15 November 1887 Fukuchiyama, Kyoto, Japan
- Died: 20 June 1959 (aged 71) Minato, Tokyo, Japan
- Party: Liberal Democratic (after 1955)
- Other political affiliations: Rikken Seiyūkai (before 1940); IRAA (1940–1945); JLP (1945–1947); DP (1947–1950); NDP (1950–1952); Kaishintō (1952–1954); JDP (1954–1955)
- Spouse: Sumi Hase (m. 1918)
- Education: Tokyo Imperial University
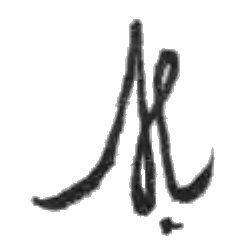
- Signature

Hitoshi Ashida (芦田 均, Ashida Hitoshi; 15 November 1887 – 20 June 1959) was a Japanese politician who served as Prime Minister of Japan in 1948. He was a prominent figure in the immediate postwar political landscape, but was forced to resign his leadership responsibilities after a corruption scandal (Shōwa Denkō Jiken) targeting two of his cabinet ministers.

== Early life and education ==
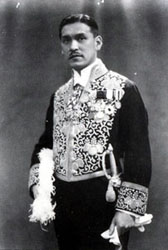
Hitoshi Ashida as diplomat in 1931

Ashida was born in Fukuchiyama, Kyoto, the second son of politician and banker Shikanosuke Ashida. His father had been in the House of Representatives and served as director of Nōkō Bank. His grandfather was landed magnate and village headman (nanushi) Jizaemon Ashida.

He studied French civil law at Tokyo Imperial University. After graduation, he worked in the Ministry of Foreign Affairs for twenty years.

== Political career ==
In 1932, Ashida ran his first successful campaign for a seat in the House of Representatives as a member of the Seiyūkai Party. He sided with Ichirō Hatoyama's "orthodox" wing following the Seiyukai's split in 1939.

After the war, Ashida won a seat in the new Diet as a member of the Liberal Party, from which he split to merge with Kijūrō Shidehara's Progressive Party to form the Democratic Party. Ashida was elected president of the new party, and became minister of foreign affairs in 1947 under Socialist prime minister Tetsu Katayama.

He also chaired the Committee on the Bill for Revision of the Imperial Constitution, and served as the chairman of the Kenpō Fukyū Kai, a society created to promote the revised Constitution of Japan, from 1946 to 1948. During his term, he made a key amendment to Article Nine of the planned Japanese Constitution, which enabled the creation of the Japanese Self-Defense Force.

== Premiership (1948) ==
- Premiership of Hitoshi Ashida; 10 March 1948 – 15 October 1948
- Monarch: Emperor Shōwa
- Cabinet: Ashida Cabinet
- Party: Democratic
- Seat: Naikaku Sōri Daijin Kantei
- Constituency: Kyoto 2nd
- Emblem of the Government of Japan

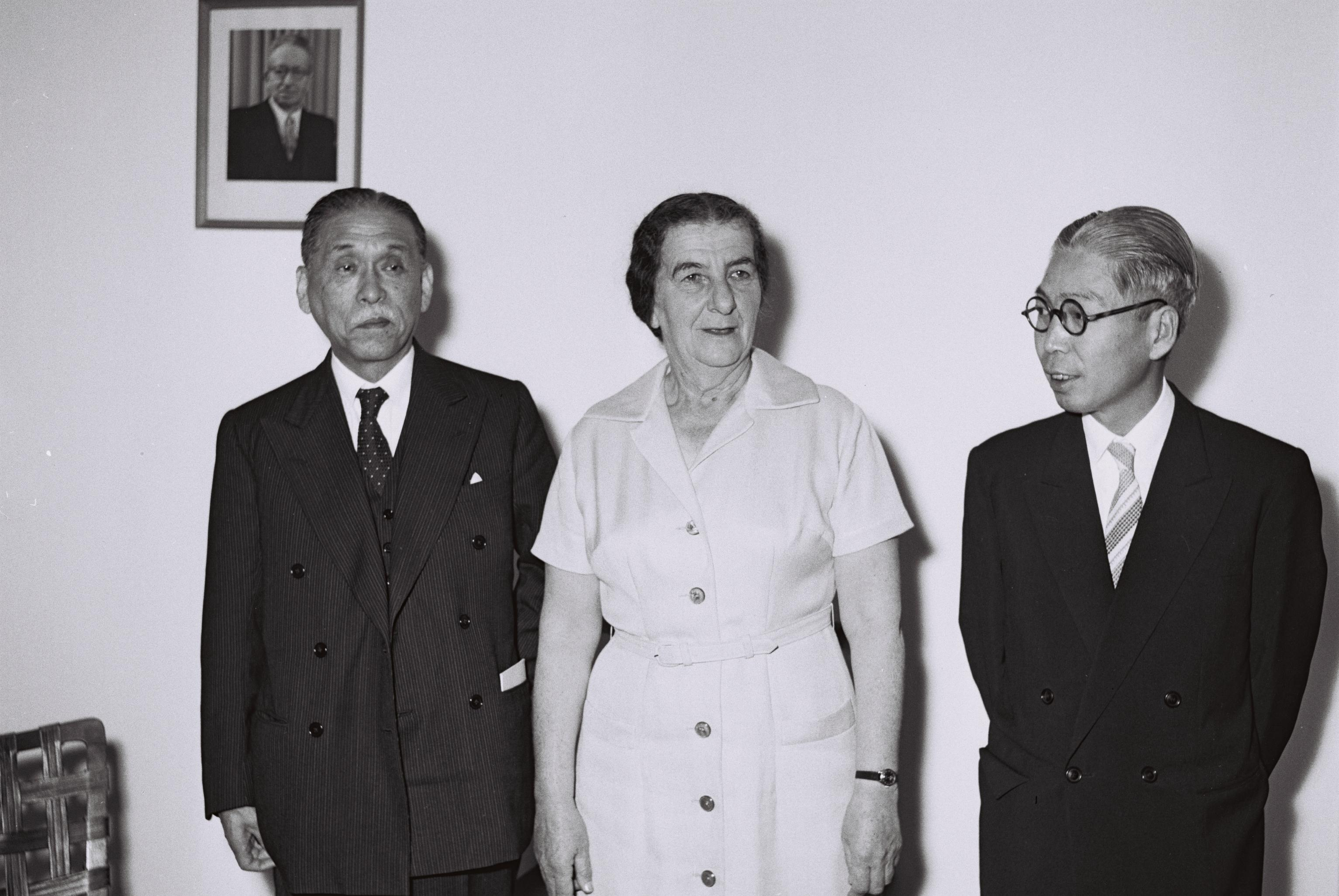
Hitoshi Ashida (L) during a visit to Israel in 1958, with Golda Meir and the Japanese Ambassador to Israel, Kuniyoshi Negishi

Ashida became prime minister in 1948, leading a coalition government of Democratic and Socialist members. His tenure ended just seven months after it began. Two of his cabinet ministers were accused of corruption in the Showa Electric scandal, which forced the cabinet to resign. One of them was Takeo Kurusu, a state minister without a portfolio.

Ashida's government was hampered by taking over at the end of the fiscal year. The country operated on a temporary budget until a budget was passed in July.

== Later life ==
After his tenure as prime minister, Ashida focused on Japan's position in Asia and re-armament. He became outspoken in support of creating a national defense force after the outbreak of the Korean War, fearing that a similar conflict may occur in Japan. Ashida also promoted the idea of forming a Japanese group of volunteers to fight alongside United Nations Command in support of the Republic of Korea. In 1951, he gave speaking tours across Japan advocating for his interpretation of Article 9, stating that it does not impose restrictions on Japan preparing a force for defensive purposes.

In 1958, Ashida was cleared of all charges in relation to corruption allegations. He died a year later at the age of seventy-one.

== Works cited ==
- Cole, Allan; Totten, George; Uyehara, Cecil (1966). Socialist Parties In Postwar Japan. Yale University Press.

Political offices
Preceded by Shigeru Yoshida	Minister of Foreign Affairs; 1947–1948	Succeeded by Shigeru Yoshida
Preceded by Tetsu Katayama	Prime Minister of Japan; 1948	Succeeded by Shigeru Yoshida
Preceded by Kijūrō Shidehara	Deputy Prime Minister of Japan; 1947–1948	Succeeded by Suehiro Nishio
Preceded by Kenzō Matsumura	Minister for Health and Welfare; 1945–1946	Succeeded by Yoshinari Kawai
House of Representatives (Japan)
New district	Representative for Kyoto 2nd district 1947–1959; Served alongside: Yoshie Ōishi, Shigesaburō Maeo, many others	Vacant Title next held by Sen'ichi Tanigaki etc.
New district	Representative for Kyoto at-large district 1946–1947; Served alongside: Chōzaburō Mizutani, Fusa Tomita, Isaji Tanaka, Yoshie Ōishi, Takeo Nakano, Katsumi Takeuchi, Hanji Ogawa, Chiyo Kimura, Taminouke Tsujii	district eliminated
Preceded by Takeshi Tsuhara; Kunikichi Murakami; San'ichirō Mizushima	Representative for Kyoto 3rd district 1932–1946; Served alongside: Momozō Nagata, San'ichirō Mizushima, Takeshi Tsuhara, Kunikichi Murakami, Keijirō Okada	district eliminated
Party political offices
New political party	President of the Democratic Party; 1947–1948	Succeeded by Takeru Inukai
Preceded by Nirō Hoshijima	PARC chairman of the Japan Liberal Party; 1946–1947	Succeeded by Seiichi Ōmura
