= Democratic Party (Japan, 1947) =

Political party in Japan

Democratic Party 民主党 Minshutō
- Other name: Nihon Minshutō
- Founders: Inukai Takeru; Hitoshi Ashida
- Founded: March 31, 1947
- Dissolved: April 28, 1950
- Preceded by: Japan Progressive Party; Liberal Party (1945); National Cooperative Party
- Succeeded by: Democratic Liberal Party; Liberal Party (1950); National Democratic Party
- Ideology: Conservatism (Japanese); Modified capitalism Corporatism
- Political position: Centre

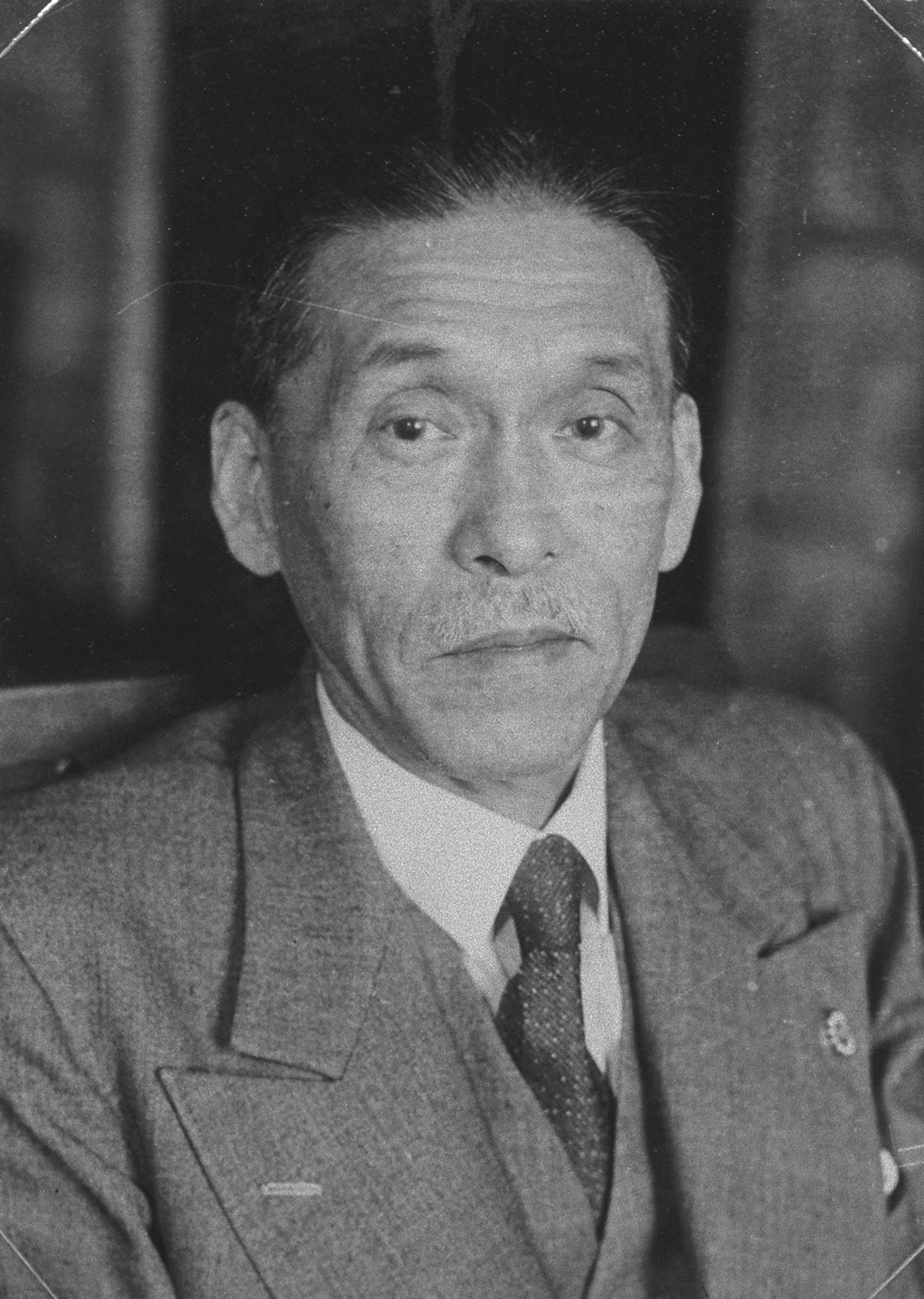
Hitoshi Ashida (1887-1959)

The Democratic Party (Japanese: 民主党, Hepburn: Minshutō), officially Nihon Minshutō (日本民主党; lit. 'Japan Democratic Party') was a centrist conservative political party in Japan.

== History ==
Takeru Inukai of the Japan Progressive Party spearheaded the movement to form a new centrist conservative party, and Hitoshi Ashida of the Liberal Party responded to his call.

The Democratic Party was formed in March 1947 through the merger of the Progressive Party and Diet members who had left the Liberal Party and the National Cooperative Party, at which time the party's name was changed. The party accepted 114 members from the Progressive Party, 9 from the Liberal Party (including Ashida), 15 from the National Cooperative Party, and 7 from independents and other smaller groups. Thus, the party came to have 145 members of parliament and became the largest party in the Diet.

The party's operations were entrusted to a standing committee composed of seven members: Ashida, Sadayoshi Hitotsumatsu, Inukai, Yoshinari Kawai, Kozaemon Kimura, Wataru Narahashi, and Takao Saitō. Kijūrō Shidehara assumed the honorary position of supreme advisor, Takeshige Ishiguro became secretary-general, and Shōtarō Yano became chairman of the Policy Research Council. Subsequently, Inukai, Narahashi, and Ishiguro were successively purged from public office, dealing a devastating blow to the party.

Ashida attracted attention from the Government Section of the General Headquarters of the Supreme Commander for the Allied Powers as a candidate to lead the new government to be formed after the general election. However, in the general election held on 25 April 1947, the party lagged far behind the Japan Socialist Party (JSP) and the Liberal Party, winning only 124 seats. As a result, a conflict arose within the party over whether or not to join the coalition government led by the JSP. On one side was the Ashida faction, a centrist group aiming to take the lead within a coalition government with the JSP, while on the other side was the Shidehara faction, a conservative group that had independently begun negotiations toward a two-party coalition with the Liberal Party. The Ashida faction, which supported participation, and the Shidehara faction, which opposed it, clashed fiercely, but ultimately the Ashida faction prevailed, and Ashida became the party president. The JSP-led government headed by Tetsu Katayama (see Katayama Cabinet) was formed through a "moderate" coalition with the Democratic Party and the National Cooperative Party. Meanwhile, the conservative faction within the party, led by Shidehara, was seeking a four-party coalition including the Liberal Party; so the establishment of a coalition government that excluded the Liberal Party led to internal party conflict. Furthermore, in November 1947, about 20 members of the Shidehara faction left the party in opposition to a socialistic bill aimed at nationalizing the coal industry. In order to oppose the Ashida Cabinet, they merged with the Liberal Party in February 1948, and formed the Democratic Liberal Party the following month. Following the exclusion of the Liberal Party and the departure of conservative members from the Democratic Party, the party's leadership became strongly inclined towards "modified capitalism." On 10 February 1948, the Katayama Cabinet was forced to resign after only ten months due to the defection of the Shidehara faction within the Democratic Party and the rebellion of Marxists within the JSP.

On 21 February 1948, an election was held to select the next prime minister, and Ashida narrowly defeated Shigeru Yoshida. On 10 March 1948, the Democratic Party, together with the Socialist Party and the National Cooperative Party, formed a coalition government headed by Ashida. These three parties, which formed the Katayama Cabinet, continued to form a political base in the Ashida Cabinet as well. However, the Ashida Cabinet collapsed after only seven months due to a political scandal in which the prime minister himself was involved. Ashida was suspected of involvement in the Showa Denko scandal, which came to light in June 1948. He was removed from his position as prime minister in October of the same year and arrested in December. A total of 62 cabinet ministers and bureaucrats, including Ashida and Suehiro Nishio, were arrested on suspicion of bribery and corruption. In the general election for the House of Representatives in January 1949, the Democratic Liberal Party won an absolute majority of seats, but Yoshida brought the Democratic Party into the coalition government. Consequently, the party split into two factions: the Inukai faction, which supported the coalition, and the Tomabechi faction, which opposed it. In March 1950, those who supported the coalition merged with the Democratic Liberal Party to form a new Liberal Party, while those opposed to the coalition merged with the National Cooperative Party in April of the same year to form the National Democratic Party.

== Ideology and policies ==
The Democratic Party has been described as centrist, conservative, and reformist.

The party adopted the slogan "modified capitalism" (修正資本主義, shūsei shihonshugi; also translatable as "revised capitalism" or "reformed capitalism"). Modified capitalism was a term that referred to policies aimed at stabilizing corporatist capitalism. The party's platform aimed to break away from the pitfalls of traditional capitalism and rectify the unrealistic aspects of socialism. It was a reformist platform that clearly distinguished itself from the platform of its predecessor, the Progressive Party. Ideologically, the party was positioned between the Liberal Party and the Japan Socialist Party, specifically as the left of the former and to the right of the latter. The party attempted to establish itself as a mediator between these two parties.

The party viewed Japan's postwar recovery path as "democratization of industry based on a comprehensive economic plan," and declared its commitment to realizing "separation of ownership and management" and "labor-management partnerships" in large corporations. The economic policies of the Ashida Cabinet included establishing a wage and price systems, shifting goods from the black market to distribution and supply routes, and providing subsidies to promote production in major industries. The basic structure of these policies was identical to that of the Katayama Cabinet.

== Election results ==
=== House of Representatives ===
Election	Leader	Votes	%	Seats	+/-	Position	Status
1947	Hitoshi Ashida	6,960,270	25.44	124 / 468	new	3rd	Governing coalition
1949	Takeru Inukai	4,798,352	15.68	69 / 466	▼55	4th	Opposition

=== House of Councillors ===
Election	Leader	Constituency			Party list			Seats	Position	Status
Election	Leader	Votes	%	Seats	Votes	%	Seats	Seats	Position	Status
1947	Ishiguro Takeshige	2,989,132	13.56	22 / 150	1,508,087	7.09	6 / 100	30 / 250	2nd	Governing coalition
