= Naoshi Ohara =

Japanese politician

Junior Second Rank Naoshi Ohara
- 小原 直
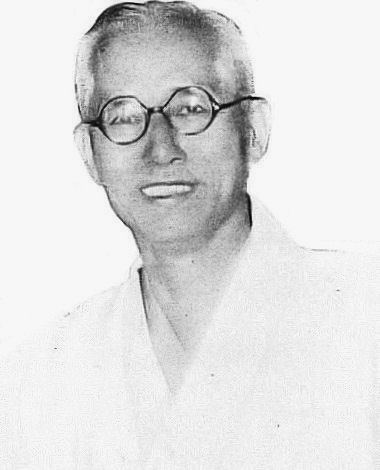
- Ohara in 1939

Chairman of the National Public Safety Commission
- In office 1 October 1954 – 10 December 1954
- Prime Minister: Shigeru Yoshida
- Preceded by: Zentarō Kosaka
- Succeeded by: Tadao Oasa

Minister of Justice
- In office 19 June 1954 – 10 December 1954
- Prime Minister: Shigeru Yoshida
- Preceded by: Ryōgorō Katō
- Succeeded by: Shirō Hanamura
- In office 8 July 1934 – 9 March 1936
- Prime Minister: Keisuke Okada
- Preceded by: Matsukichi Koyama
- Succeeded by: Raizaburō Hayashi

Ministers of Home Affairs
- In office 30 August 1939 – 16 January 1940
- Prime Minister: Nobuyuki Abe
- Preceded by: Kōichi Kido
- Succeeded by: Hideo Kodama

Minister of Health and Welfare
- In office 30 August 1939 – 29 November 1939
- Prime Minister: Nobuyuki Abe
- Preceded by: Hisatada Hirose
- Succeeded by: Kiyoshi Akita

Member of the House of Peers
- In office 2 September 1936 – 24 April 1946 Nominated by the Emperor

Personal details
- Born: 24 January 1877 Nagaoka, Niigata, Japan
- Died: 8 September 1966 (aged 89) Tokyo, Japan
- Party: Liberal (1950–1955)
- Other political affiliations: Independent (before 1950)
- Education: Tokyo Imperial University

Naoshi Ohara (小原 直, Ohara Naoshi; 24 January 1877 – 8 September 1966) was a bureaucrat and cabinet minister in early Shōwa period Japan.

== Biography ==
Ohara was born in what is now Nagaoka, Niigata as the third son of Tanaka Keijiro, a former samurai, the son of an impoverished former samurai, but was later adopted by Ohara Tomotada, a former samurai from Aizu Domain, and took the Ohara surname. One of his early classmates was the future diplomat Matsudaira Tsuneo. He graduated from the law school of Tokyo Imperial University in July 1902 and received a posting to the Ministry of Justice as a public prosecutor. He served in that capacity for the next few years with the Shizuoka District Court, the Tokyo District Court and the Chiba District Court, and made a name in several trials involving high-profile corruption scandals, notably the Ōura scandal and Siemens scandal, as well as in the High Treason Incident, where he was the lead interrogator for prosecuting Kanno Sugako.

Ohara was appointed as Deputy Minister of Justice under Yoshimichi Hara in the Tanaka Cabinet, serving in the same post under the subsequent Hamaguchi, Inukai and Saitō Cabinets. Under the Okada Cabinet, he joined the cabinet as Minister of Justice from 1934 to 1936. One of his first actions was to poll several bar associations on the need for judicial reform, including the simplification and streamlining of legal procedures. During his tenure, he presided over a number of crisis, including the Teijin Incident, and February 26 Incident. On being informed of the failure of the rebels to assassinate Prime Minister Okada by the prime minister's chief secretary Hisatsune Sakomizu, he quickly urged Okada to visit the Imperial Palace for safety and to secure the support of Emperor Hirohito against the rebellion. These actions earned him the wrath of the Imperial Japanese Army General Staff Office, which refused to sanction his continuation as Justice Minister under the Hirota Cabinet. He strenuously opposed the actions of his successor, Suehiko Shiono in 1937 and 1938 and was not given a post in the First Konoe Cabinet or the Hiranuma Cabinet, but returned to the cabinet in August 1939 under the Abe Cabinet as both Minister of Welfare and Home Minister. However, his disagreements over the enforcement of Japan's increasingly totalitarian application of the Peace Preservation Laws against “thought crimes”, speaking out against police abuse of power and bureaucratic incivility to the general populace alienated him from the supporters of his rival Shiono, and he resigned in January 1940.

Ohara returned to the government of post-occupation Japan under the Fifth Yoshida Cabinet in June 1954 as Minister of Justice as well as Chairman of the National Public Safety Commission. He retired in December 1954.

== Notes ==
Political offices
Preceded by Zentaro Kosaka	Chairman of the National Public Safety Commission; 1 October 1954 – 10 December 1954	Succeeded by Tadao Ōasa
Preceded by Ryōgorō Katō	Minister of Justice; 19 July 1954 – 10 December 1954	Succeeded by Shirō Hanamura
Preceded by Hisatada Hirose	Minister of Health and Welfare; 30 August 1939 – 29 November 1939	Succeeded by Kiyoshi Akita
Preceded by Kōichi Kido	Minister of Home Affairs; 30 August 1939 – 15 January 1940	Succeeded by Hideo Kodama
Preceded by Matsukichi Koyama	Minister of Justice; 8 July 1934 – 2 February 1937	Succeeded by Reizaburō Hayashi
