= Fifth Yoshida cabinet =

Cabinet of Japan (1953–1954)

Fifth Yoshida Cabinet
- 51st Cabinet of Japan

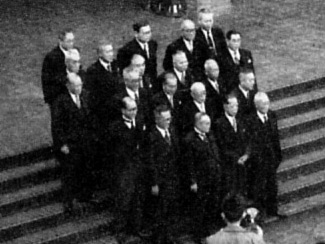
- Date formed: May 21, 1953
- Date dissolved: December 10, 1954

People and organisations
- Emperor: Shōwa
- Prime Minister: Shigeru Yoshida
- Deputy Prime Minister: Taketora Ogata
- Member party: Liberal Party
- Status in legislature: House of Representatives: Minority; House of Councillors: Minority
- Opposition parties: Kaishintō; Rightist Socialist Party of Japan; Leftist Socialist Party of Japan; Liberal Party–Hatoyama; Japanese Communist Party; Labourers and Farmers Party; Ryokufūkai

History
- Election: 1953 general election
- Legislature term: 16th-18th National Diet
- Predecessor: Fourth Yoshida Cabinet
- Successor: First Ichirō Hatoyama Cabinet

The Fifth Yoshida Cabinet was the 51st Cabinet of Japan. It was headed by Shigeru Yoshida from May 21, 1953, to December 10, 1954.

== Cabinet ==
Portfolio	Name	Political party	Term start	Term end
Prime Minister	Shigeru Yoshida	Liberal	May 21, 1953	December 10, 1954
Deputy Prime Minister	Taketora Ogata	Liberal	May 21, 1953	December 10, 1954
Minister of Justice	Takeru Inukai	Liberal	May 21, 1953	April 2, 1954
Minister of Justice	Katō Ryōgorō	Liberal	April 2, 1954	June 19, 1954
Minister of Justice	Naoshi Ohara	Liberal	June 19, 1954	December 10, 1954
Minister for Foreign Affairs	Katsuo Okazaki	Liberal	May 21, 1953	December 10, 1954
Minister of Finance	Ogasawara Sankurō	Liberal	May 21, 1953	December 10, 1954
Minister of Education	Ōdachi Shigeo	Liberal	May 21, 1953	December 10, 1954
Minister of Health	Yamagata Katsumi	Liberal	May 21, 1953	January 9, 1954
Minister of Health	Kusaba Ryūen	Liberal	January 9, 1954	December 10, 1954
Minister of Agriculture, Forestry and Fisheries	Uchida Nobuya	Liberal	May 21, 1953	June 22, 1953
Minister of Agriculture, Forestry and Fisheries	Shigeru Hori	Liberal	June 22, 1953	December 10, 1954
Minister of International Trade and Industry Director of the Economic Deliberation Agency	Okano Kiyohide	Liberal	May 21, 1953	January 9, 1954
Minister of International Trade and Industry Director of the Economic Deliberation Agency	Kiichi Aichi	Liberal	January 9, 1954	December 10, 1954
Minister of Transport	Ishii Mitsujirō	Liberal	May 21, 1953	December 10, 1954
Minister of Posts Director of the Administrative Management Agency Director of the Autonomy Agency	Tsukada Juichirō	Liberal	May 21, 1953	December 10, 1954
Minister of Labor	Zentarō Kosaka	Liberal	May 21, 1953	December 10, 1954
Minister of Construction	Totsuka Kuichirō	Liberal	May 21, 1953	June 16, 1954
Minister of Construction	Ozawa Saeki	Liberal	June 16, 1954	December 10, 1954
Director of the National Safety Agency	Kimura Tōkutarō	Liberal	May 21, 1953	July 1, 1954
Director of the Defense Agency	Kimura Tōkutarō	Liberal	July 1, 1954	December 10, 1954
Chair of the National Public Safety Commission	Zentarō Kosaka	Liberal	July 1, 1954	October 1, 1954
Chair of the National Public Safety Commission	Naoshi Ohara	Liberal	October 1, 1954	December 10, 1954
Director of the Hokkaido Regional Development Agency	Totsuka Kuichirō	Liberal	May 21, 1953	January 14, 1954
Director of the Hokkaido Regional Development Agency	Ōno Banboku	Liberal	January 14, 1954	July 27, 1954
Director of the Hokkaido Regional Development Agency	Taketora Ogata	Liberal	July 27, 1954	December 10, 1954
Minister of State	Andō Masazumi	Liberal	May 21, 1953	November 24, 1953
Minister of State	Ōno Banboku	Liberal	May 21, 1953	January 14, 1954
Minister of State	Ōnogi Hidejirō	Liberal	May 21, 1953	December 10, 1954
Minister of State	Katō Ryōgorō	Liberal	January 9, 1954	April 2, 1954
Minister of State	Katō Ryōgorō	Liberal	June 19, 1954	December 10, 1954
Minister of State (from September 24, 1954) Chief Cabinet Secretary	Kenji Fukunaga	Liberal	May 21, 1953	December 10, 1954
Director-General of the Cabinet Legislation Bureau	Satō Tatsuo	Independent	May 21, 1953	December 10, 1954
Deputy Chief Cabinet Secretary	Tanaka Fuwazō	Liberal	May 21, 1953	December 10, 1954
Deputy Chief Cabinet Secretary	Eguchi Mitoru	Independent	May 21, 1953	June 30, 1954
Deputy Chief Cabinet Secretary	Taniguchi Yutaka	Independent	August 24, 1954	December 10, 1954
