= Kuichirō Totsuka =

Japanese politician

- 戸塚 九一郎
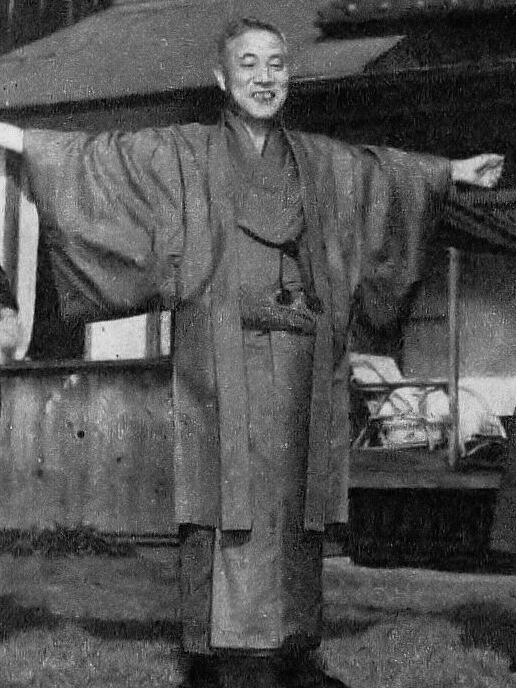
- Totsuka in 1953

Minister of Construction
- In office 10 February 1953 – 16 June 1954
- Prime Minister: Shigeru Yoshida
- Preceded by: Eisaku Satō
- Succeeded by: Shigeaki Ozawa

Director-General of the Hokkaido Development Agency
- In office 10 February 1953 – 14 January 1954
- Prime Minister: Shigeru Yoshida
- Preceded by: Eisaku Satō
- Succeeded by: Banboku Ōno

Minister of Labour
- In office 30 October 1952 – 21 May 1953
- Prime Minister: Shigeru Yoshida
- Preceded by: Eichi Yoshitake
- Succeeded by: Zentarō Kosaka

Member of the House of Representatives
- In office 1 October 1952 – 25 April 1958
- Constituency: Shizuoka 1st
Gubernatorial offices
Governor of Fukuoka Prefecture
In office 21 December 1944 – 10 June 1945
Monarch	Hirohito
Preceded by	Shigeru Yoshida
Succeeded by	Shunsuke Yamada
25th Director-General of the Hokkaidō Agency
In office 5 September 1939 – 15 June 1942
Monarch	Hirohito
Preceded by	Nakarai Kiyoshi
Succeeded by	Chiaki Saka
Governor of Miyagi Prefecture
In office 17 April 1939 – 7 September 1939
Monarch	Hirohito
Preceded by	Yoshio Kikuyama
Succeeded by	Ryōsaku Shimizu
Governor of Yamaguchi Prefecture
In office 12 June 1936 – 17 April 1939
Monarch	Hirohito
Preceded by	Yoshio Kikuyama
Succeeded by	Gunji Takei
Governor of Tokushima Prefecture
In office 30 October 1934 – 12 June 1936
Monarch	Hirohito
Preceded by	Tarō Kanamori
Succeeded by	Ryōsaku Shimizu

Personal details
- Born: 27 March 1891 Kakegawa, Shizuoka, Japan
- Died: 13 October 1973 (aged 82)
- Party: Liberal Democratic
- Other political affiliations: Liberal (1952–1955)
- Education: Tokyo Imperial University

Kuichirō Totsuka (戸塚 九一郎, Totsuka Kuichirō; 27 March 1891 – 13 October 1973) was a Japanese bureaucrat and politician. A career official of the Home Ministry, he served as governor of Tokushima Prefecture, Yamaguchi Prefecture, Miyagi Prefecture, and Fukuoka Prefecture, as the 25th Director-General of the Hokkaidō Agency, and after the war as a member of the House of Representatives, Minister of Labour, Minister of Construction, and Director-General of the Hokkaido Development Agency.

== Early life and education ==
Totsuka was born on 27 March 1891 in Kakegawa, Shizuoka Prefecture. Kotobank states that he graduated from the German law course of the law faculty at Tokyo Imperial University in 1917 and entered the Home Ministry in the same year.

== Career ==
Before becoming a prefectural governor, Totsuka served in a range of Home Ministry and police-related posts, including service as a local administrator, police official, and education department official in several prefectures. He successively served as governor of Tokushima, Yamaguchi, Miyagi, and Fukuoka prefectures. The official Miyagi Prefecture list gives his tenure there as beginning on 17 April 1939, with his successor taking office on 7 September 1939.

During his governorship of Yamaguchi Prefecture, he promoted major river-development and water-use planning, including the establishment of a water-resource investigation committee aimed at industrial water supply, hydroelectric generation, and flood control.

On 5 September 1939, Totsuka was appointed the 25th Director-General of the Hokkaidō Agency where he lasted until 15 June 1942. After leaving Hokkaido he served as a munitions official and military procurement inspector.

By December 1944 Totsuka was serving as governor of Fukuoka Prefecture and chairman of the Kyushu Local Administration Council. When the Kyushu Regional Government was created in June 1945, he continued from that position to become Kyushu Regional Governor.

After the war, Totsuka was purged from public office. After the purge, he was then elected to the House of Representatives from Shizuoka 1st district at the 1952 general election, was re-elected in 1953, and won a third term in 1955.

In the Fourth Yoshida Cabinet, Totsuka served as Minister of Labour from the cabinet's formation on 30 October 1952, and from 10 February 1953 also concurrently held the posts of Minister of Construction and Director-General of the Hokkaido Development Agency. In the Fifth Yoshida Cabinet, he continued as Minister of Construction until 16 June 1954 and as Director-General of the Hokkaido Development Agency until 14 January 1954.

== Later life and death ==
Totsuka died on 13 October 1973.
