= Abe Cabinet =

Abe Cabinet may refer to:

- Nobuyuki Abe Cabinet, the Japanese government led by Nobuyuki Abe from 1939 to 1940
- First Abe Cabinet, the Japanese majority government led by Shinzo Abe from 2006 to 2007
- Second Abe Cabinet, the Japanese majority government led by Shinzo Abe from 2012 to 2014
- Third Abe Cabinet, the Japanese majority government led by Shinzo Abe from 2014 to 2017
- Fourth Abe Cabinet, the Japanese majority government led by Shinzo Abe from 2017 to 2020
