= Matsuoka Toshizō =

Japanese politician (1880–1955)

- 松岡 俊三
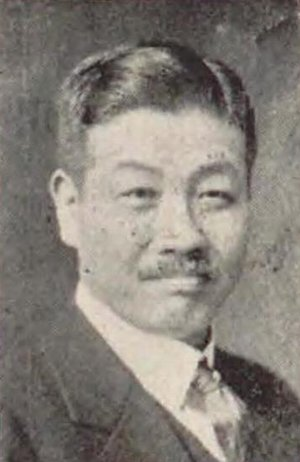
- Matsuoka in 1928

Parliamentary Vice-Minister of Colonial Affairs
- In office 16 January 1940 – 22 July 1940
- Prime Minister: Mitsumasa Yonai
- Preceded by: Tsukumo Kunitoshi
- Succeeded by: Kiyoshi Akita

Member of the House of Representatives
- In office 1 October 1952 – 16 February 1955
- Preceded by: Yasumasa Zushi
- Succeeded by: Yūzō Matsuzawa
- Constituency: Yamagata 2nd
- In office 20 February 1932 – 18 December 1945
- Preceded by: Shinmatsu Monden
- Succeeded by: Constituency abolished
- Constituency: Yamagata 2nd
- In office 17 July 1925 – 28 October 1929
- Preceded by: Hosoume Saburō
- Succeeded by: Shinmatsu Monden
- Constituency: Yamagata 6th (1924–1928); Yamagata 2nd (1928–1929)
- In office 10 May 1920 – 31 January 1924
- Preceded by: Constituency established
- Succeeded by: Motoshirō Takahashi
- Constituency: Tochigi 5th

Personal details
- Born: 14 July 1880 Murayama, Yamagata, Japan
- Died: February 16, 1955 (aged 74) Tsuruoka, Yamagata, Japan
- Party: Liberal (1952–1955)
- Other political affiliations: Rikken Seiyūkai (1920–1940); IRAA (1940–1945)
- Spouse: Kuni Akira
- Children: 2
- Parent(s): Ihei Murakawa (Biological father); Shirao Matsuoka (Adoptive father)
- Education: Shinshū University; Nihon Law School
- Occupation: Journalist, politician

Matsuoka Toshizō (松岡俊三; 14 July 1880 – 16 February 1955), was a journalist, a 9 term member of the House of Representatives of Japan, and the Parliamentary Vice-Minister for Colonial Affairs in the Yonai Cabinet.

== Early life ==
Matsuoka was born the eldest son of Ihei Murakawa, a poor farmer in Tateoka-cho, Kitamurayama-gun, Yamagata Prefecture (now Murayama City). As boy, he worked as an apprentice to his mother's family, sake brewers in the Tochigi Prefecture. At the age of 16, he was adopted by his uncle, Shirao Matsuoka, a Buddhist priest.

Matsuoka would attend Shinshū University and Nihon Law School in Tokyo, then serve in the Japanese Army during the Russo-Japanese War, earning a silver Golden Kite for his valor.

Following the war, he joined the Miyako Shimbun newspaper, where he served as a political reporter, editor, and eventually becoming its vice president.

== Political career ==
Matsuoka ran as Yamagata's Seiyūkai representative to the lower house in the 1920 Japanese general election, holding the seat for 7 terms before joining Mitsumasa Yonai's cabinet in 1940.

During his tenure, he was a strong advocate for his rural snowbound constituents who suffered from the harsh winter climate of the region, causing poor harvests and significant property damage every year. Matsuoka's efforts established funds for the national "Snow Region Rural Economic Research Institute" (積雪地方農村経済調査所) and the "Economic Rehabilitation Agency for Agricultural, Forestry and Fishery Areas in Snow Damaged Areas" (雪害地農山漁家経済更正機関), helping improve the lives of many depressed rural villages throughout the Tohoku and the Hokuriku regions.

After World War 2, Matsuoka was expelled from public office as part of the purge of government officials by the Allied forces, during which time he returned to Yamagata to help his constituents in rural areas, serving as the chairman of a Buddhist agricultural cooperative association.

Once the expulsion order was abolished after the Allied occupation ended in 1952, Matsuoka returned to the House of Representatives for 2 more terms with the forerunner to today's Liberal Democratic Party, collapsing while campaigning in Tsuruoka, Yamagata on 13 February 1955. He would die 3 days later at the age of 74 years.

== Legacy ==
Matsuoka is remembered today throughout Yamagata for his long service to the region. A bronze statue of him was erected in Shinjo City in 1957. The Chichibōonji Buddhist temple on the grounds of Hongakuji cemetery in Murayama City was built by Matsuoka in 1935, containing a 300 year old Buddha inherited from his adoptive priest father, whom he prayed to for safety during a constituent tour in 1930 when he was caught in a blizzard. It is affectionately known as the "Snow Buddha" (雪の観音) shrine as a result. Murayama City also dedicates a large straw sandal (waraji) to Senso-ji and Komatsuzawa Buddhist temples every 10 years, a practice first started by Matsuoka in 1941.
