= Yonai cabinet =

Cabinet of Japan (January 16 - July 22, 1940)

Yonai Cabinet
- 37th Cabinet of Japan

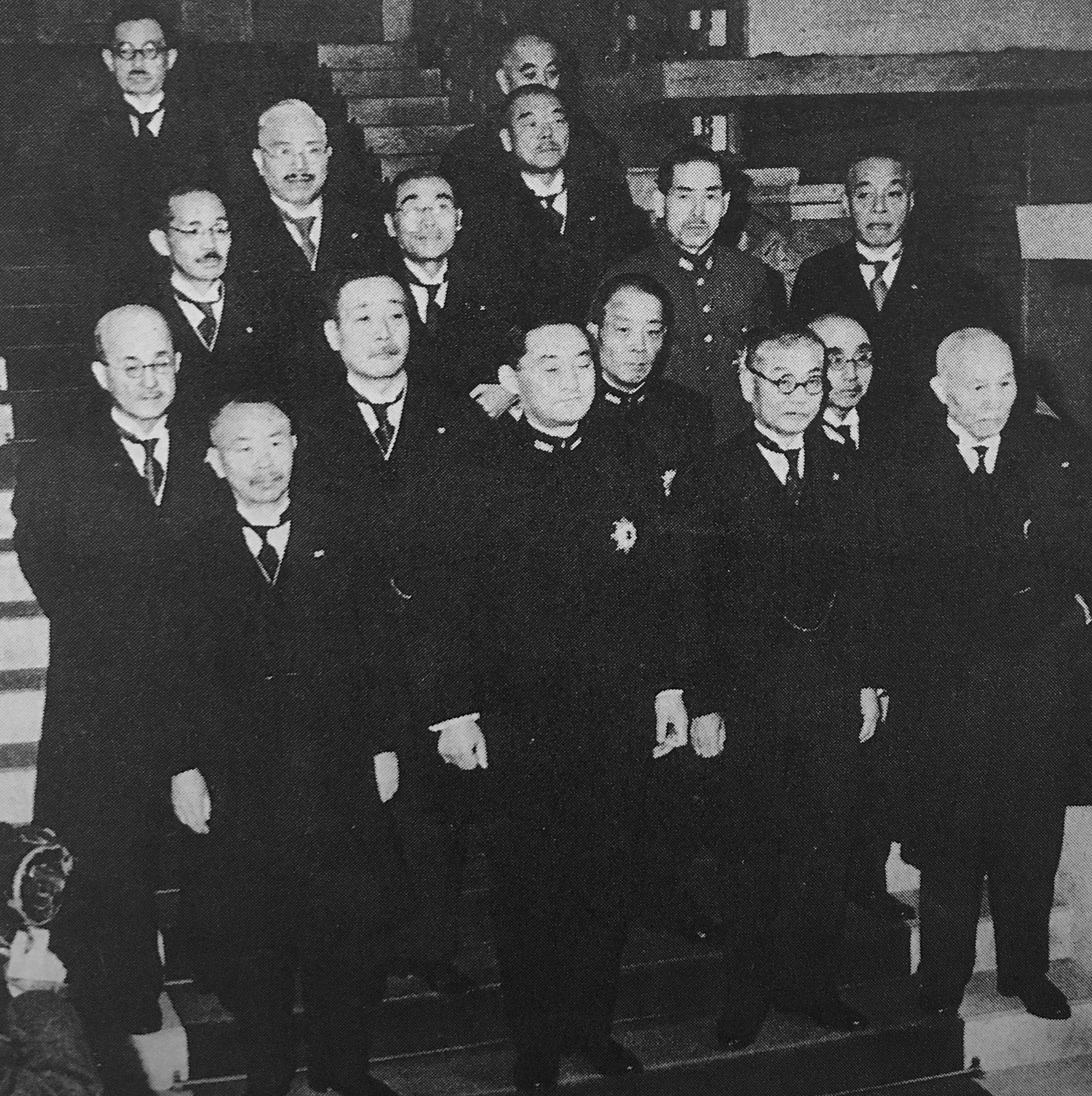
- Date formed: January 16, 1940
- Date dissolved: July 22, 1940

People and organisations
- Emperor: Shōwa
- Prime Minister: Mitsumasa Yonai
- Member parties: Rikken Minseitō; Rikken Seiyūkai; Independent; Military
- Status in legislature: Majority (coalition)

History
- Legislature term: 75th Imperial Diet
- Predecessor: Nobuyuki Abe Cabinet
- Successor: Second Konoe Cabinet

The Yonai Cabinet is the 37th Cabinet of Japan led by Mitsumasa Yonai from January 16 to July 22, 1940.

== Cabinet ==
Ministers
| Portfolio | Name | Political party | Term start | Term end |
|---|---|---|---|---|
| Prime Minister | Mitsumasa Yonai | Military (Navy) | January 16, 1940 | July 22, 1940 |
| Minister for Foreign Affairs | Hachirō Arita | Independent | January 16, 1940 | July 22, 1940 |
| Minister of Home Affairs | Count Hideo Kodama | Independent | January 16, 1940 | July 22, 1940 |
| Minister of Finance | Yukio Sakurauchi | Rikken Minseitō | January 16, 1940 | July 22, 1940 |
| Minister of the Army | Shunroku Hata | Military (Army) | January 16, 1940 | July 22, 1940 |
| Minister of the Navy | Zengo Yoshida | Military (Navy) | January 16, 1940 | July 22, 1940 |
| Minister of Justice | Shōtatsu Kimura | Independent | January 16, 1940 | July 22, 1940 |
| Minister of Education | Shigejirō Matsūra | Independent | January 16, 1940 | July 22, 1940 |
| Minister of Agriculture and Forestry | Toshio Shimada | Rikken Seiyūkai | January 16, 1940 | July 22, 1940 |
| Minister of Commerce and Industry | Ginjirō Fujiwara | Independent | January 16, 1940 | July 22, 1940 |
| Minister of Communications | Masanori Katsu | Rikken Minseitō | January 16, 1940 | July 22, 1940 |
| Minister of Railways | Tsuruhei Matsuno | Rikken Seiyūkai | January 16, 1940 | July 22, 1940 |
| Minister of Colonial Affairs | Kuniaki Koiso | Military (Army) | January 16, 1940 | July 22, 1940 |
| Minister of Health | Shigeru Yoshida | Independent | January 16, 1940 | July 22, 1940 |
| Chief Cabinet Secretary | Sōtarō Ishiwata | Independent | January 16, 1940 | July 22, 1940 |
| Director-General of the Cabinet Legislation Bureau | Hisatada Hirose | Independent | January 16, 1940 | July 22, 1940 |
Parliamentary Vice-Ministers
| Portfolio | Name | Political party | Term start | Term end |
| Parliamentary Vice-Minister for Foreign Affairs | Koyama Tanizō | Rikken Minseitō | September 19, 1939 | January 16, 1940 |
| Parliamentary Vice-Minister of Home Affairs | Tsurumi Yūsuke | Rikken Minseitō | September 19, 1939 | January 16, 1940 |
| Parliamentary Vice-Minister of Finance | Kimura Masayoshi | Rikken Seiyūkai | September 19, 1939 | January 16, 1940 |
| Parliamentary Vice-Minister of the Army | Hideyuki Miyoshi | Rikken Minseitō | September 19, 1939 | January 16, 1940 |
| Parliamentary Vice-Minister of the Navy | Matsuyama Tsunejirō | Rikken Seiyūkai | September 19, 1939 | January 16, 1940 |
| Parliamentary Vice-Minister of Justice | Nirō Hoshijima | Rikken Seiyūkai | September 19, 1939 | January 16, 1940 |
| Parliamentary Vice-Minister of Education | Viscount Funabashi Kiyokata | Independent | September 19, 1939 | January 16, 1940 |
| Parliamentary Vice-Minister of Agriculture, Forestry and Fisheries | Okada Kikuji | Rikken Minseitō | September 19, 1939 | January 16, 1940 |
| Parliamentary Vice-Minister of Commerce and Industry | Ryōgorō Katō | Rikken Seiyūkai | September 19, 1939 | January 16, 1940 |
| Parliamentary Vice-Minister of Communications | Takechi Yūki | Rikken Minseitō | September 19, 1939 | January 16, 1940 |
| Parliamentary Vice-Minister of Railways | Miyazawa Yutaka | Rikken Seiyūkai | September 19, 1939 | January 16, 1940 |
| Parliamentary Vice-Minister of Colonial Affairs | Toshizō Matsuoka | Rikken Seiyūkai | September 19, 1939 | January 16, 1940 |
| Parliamentary Vice-Minister of Health | Sadayoshi Hitotsumatsu | Rikken Minseitō | September 19, 1939 | January 16, 1940 |
Parliamentary Undersecretaries
| Portfolio | Name | Political party | Term start | Term end |
| Parliamentary Undersecretary for Foreign Affairs | Odaka Chōzaburō | Rikken Seiyūkai | September 19, 1939 | January 16, 1940 |
| Parliamentary Undersecretary of Home Affairs | Aoyama Kenzō | Rikken Seiyūkai | September 19, 1939 | January 16, 1940 |
| Parliamentary Undersecretary of Finance | Matsuda Masakazu | Rikken Minseitō | September 19, 1939 | January 16, 1940 |
| Parliamentary Undersecretary of the Army | Miyazaki Ichi | Rikken Seiyūkai | September 19, 1939 | January 16, 1940 |
| Parliamentary Undersecretary of the Navy | Koyama Kunitarō | Rikken Minseitō | September 19, 1939 | January 16, 1940 |
| Parliamentary Undersecretary of Justice | Viscount Masanari Takagi | Independent | September 19, 1939 | January 16, 1940 |
| Parliamentary Undersecretary of Education | Nakaima Sōichi | Rikken Minseitō | September 19, 1939 | January 16, 1940 |
| Parliamentary Undersecretary of Agriculture, Forestry and Fisheries | Matsuki Hiromu | Rikken Seiyūkai | September 19, 1939 | January 16, 1940 |
| Parliamentary Undersecretary of Commerce and Industry | Kita Sōichirō | Rikken Minseitō | September 19, 1939 | January 16, 1940 |
| Parliamentary Undersecretary of Communications | Fujiu Yasutarō | Rikken Seiyūkai | September 19, 1939 | January 16, 1940 |
| Parliamentary Undersecretary of Railways | Ōshima Torakichi | Rikken Minseitō | September 19, 1939 | January 16, 1940 |
| Parliamentary Undersecretary of Colonial Affairs | Katō Yoshiyuki | Independent | September 19, 1939 | January 16, 1940 |
| Parliamentary Undersecretary of Health | Īmura Gorō | Rikken Seiyūkai | September 19, 1939 | January 16, 1940 |
