= Nobuyuki Abe cabinet =

Cabinet of Japan (1939–1940)

Nobuyuki Abe Cabinet
- 36th Cabinet of Japan

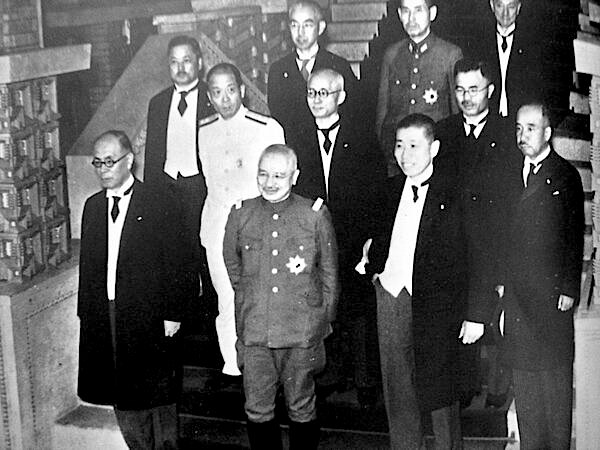
- Date formed: August 30, 1939
- Date dissolved: January 16, 1940

People and organisations
- Emperor: Shōwa
- Prime Minister: Nobuyuki Abe
- Member parties: Rikken Minseitō; Rikken Seiyūkai; Kokumin Dōmei; Independent; Military
- Status in legislature: Majority (coalition)

History
- Legislature term: 75th Imperial Diet
- Predecessor: Hiranuma Cabinet
- Successor: Yonai Cabinet

The Nobuyuki Abe Cabinet is the 36th Cabinet of Japan led by Nobuyuki Abe from August 30, 1939, to January 16, 1940.

== Cabinet ==
Ministers
Portfolio	Name	Political party	Term start	Term end
Prime Minister	Nobuyuki Abe	Military (Army)	August 30, 1939	January 16, 1940
Minister for Foreign Affairs	Nobuyuki Abe	Military (Army)	August 30, 1939	September 25, 1939
Minister for Foreign Affairs	Kichisaburō Nomura	Military (Navy)	September 25, 1939	January 16, 1940
Minister of Home Affairs	Naoshi Ohara	Independent	August 30, 1939	January 16, 1940
Minister of Finance	Kazuo Aoki	Independent	August 30, 1939	January 16, 1940
Minister of the Army	Shunroku Hata	Military (Army)	August 30, 1939	January 16, 1940
Minister of the Navy	Zengo Yoshida	Military (Navy)	August 30, 1939	January 16, 1940
Minister of Justice	Miyagi Chōgorō	Independent	August 30, 1939	January 16, 1940
Minister of Education	Kakichi Kawarada	Independent	August 30, 1939	January 16, 1940
Minister of Agriculture, Forestry and Fisheries	Takuo Godō	Independent	August 30, 1939	October 16, 1939
Minister of Agriculture, Forestry and Fisheries	Count Sakai Tadamasa	Independent	October 16, 1939	January 16, 1940
Minister of Commerce and Industry	Takuo Godō	Independent	August 30, 1939	January 16, 1940
Minister of Communications	Ryūtarō Nagai	Rikken Minseitō	August 30, 1939	January 16, 1940
Minister of Railways	Ryūtarō Nagai	Rikken Minseitō	August 30, 1939	November 29, 1939
Minister of Railways	Hidejirō Nagata	Independent	November 29, 1939	January 16, 1940
Minister of Colonial Affairs	Tsuneo Kanemitsu	Rikken Seiyūkai	August 30, 1939	January 16, 1940
Minister of Health	Naoshi Ohara	Independent	August 30, 1939	November 29, 1939
Minister of Health	Kiyoshi Akita	Independent	November 29, 1939	January 16, 1940
Chief Cabinet Secretary	Endō Ryūsaku	Independent	August 30, 1939	January 16, 1940
Director-General of the Cabinet Legislation Bureau	Karasawa Toshiki	Independent	August 30, 1939	January 16, 1940
Parliamentary Vice-Ministers
Portfolio	Name	Political party	Term start	Term end
Parliamentary Vice-Minister for Foreign Affairs	Tada Mitsunaga	Rikken Minseitō	September 19, 1939	January 16, 1940
Parliamentary Vice-Minister of Home Affairs	Katō Taichi	Kokumin Dōmei	September 19, 1939	January 16, 1940
Parliamentary Vice-Minister of Finance	Kiyose Kikuo	Rikken Seiyūkai	September 19, 1939	January 16, 1940
Parliamentary Vice-Minister of the Army	Miyazawa Taneo	Rikken Minseitō	September 19, 1939	January 16, 1940
Parliamentary Vice-Minister of the Navy	Nishioka Takejirō	Rikken Seiyūkai	September 19, 1939	January 16, 1940
Parliamentary Vice-Minister of Justice	Morita Fukuichi	Rikken Seiyūkai	September 19, 1939	January 16, 1940
Parliamentary Vice-Minister of Education	Sakuta Takatarō	Rikken Minseitō	September 19, 1939	January 16, 1940
Parliamentary Vice-Minister of Agriculture, Forestry and Fisheries	Murakami Kunikichi	Rikken Minseitō	September 19, 1939	January 16, 1940
Parliamentary Vice-Minister of Commerce and Industry	Yokokawa Jūji	Rikken Seiyūkai	September 19, 1939	January 16, 1940
Parliamentary Vice-Minister of Communications	Tanaka Manitsu	Rikken Minseitō	September 19, 1939	January 16, 1940
Parliamentary Vice-Minister of Railways	Hara Sōbee	Rikken Seiyūkai	September 19, 1939	January 16, 1940
Parliamentary Vice-Minister of Colonial Affairs	Tsukumo Kunitoshi	Rikken Seiyūkai	September 19, 1939	January 16, 1940
Parliamentary Vice-Minister of Health	Miura Torao	Kokumin Dōmei	September 19, 1939	January 16, 1940
Parliamentary Undersecretaries
Portfolio	Name	Political party	Term start	Term end
Parliamentary Undersecretary for Foreign Affairs	Yorimitsu Yoshiaki	Rikken Seiyūkai	September 19, 1939	January 16, 1940
Parliamentary Undersecretary of Home Affairs	Fukui Jinzō	Rikken Seiyūkai	September 19, 1939	January 16, 1940
Parliamentary Undersecretary of Finance	Toyota Toyokichi	Rikken Minseitō	September 19, 1939	January 16, 1940
Parliamentary Undersecretary of the Army	Oyamada Yoshitaka	Rikken Seiyūkai	September 19, 1939	January 16, 1940
Parliamentary Undersecretary of the Navy	Manabe Gijū	Rikken Minseitō	September 19, 1939	January 16, 1940
Parliamentary Undersecretary of Justice	Manabe Katsu	Rikken Minseitō	September 19, 1939	January 16, 1940
Parliamentary Undersecretary of Education	Izu Tomito	Kokumin Dōmei	September 19, 1939	January 16, 1940
Parliamentary Undersecretary of Agriculture, Forestry and Fisheries	Ogasawara Sankurō	Rikken Seiyūkai	September 19, 1939	January 16, 1940
Parliamentary Undersecretary of Commerce and Industry	Oyama Kuranosuke	Rikken Minseitō	September 19, 1939	January 16, 1940
Parliamentary Undersecretary of Communications	Tōjō Tei	Rikken Seiyūkai	September 19, 1939	January 16, 1940
Parliamentary Undersecretary of Railways	Bandō Kōtarō	Rikken Minseitō	September 19, 1939	January 16, 1940
Parliamentary Undersecretary of Colonial Affairs	Kasai Jūji	Independent	September 19, 1939	January 16, 1940
Parliamentary Undersecretary of Health	Nagayama Tadanori	Independent	September 19, 1939	January 16, 1940
