= Tanaka Giichi cabinet =

Cabinet of Japan (1927–1929)

Tanaka Giichi Cabinet
- 26th Cabinet of Japan

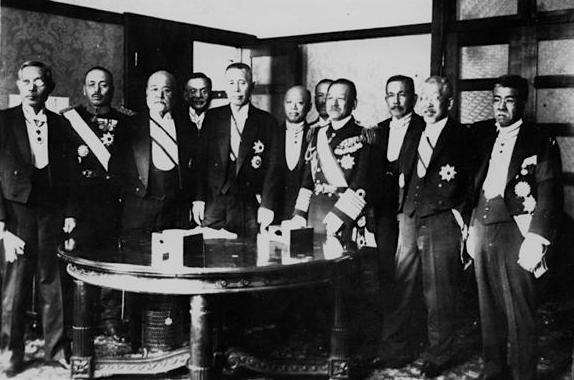
- Date formed: April 20, 1927
- Date dissolved: July 2, 1929

People and organisations
- Emperor: Shōwa
- Prime Minister: Tanaka Giichi
- Member party: HoR Blocs: Association of Friends of Constitutional Government; HoP Blocs: Kenkyūkai; Kōuyu Club

History
- Election: 1928 general election
- Legislature terms: 53rd Imperial Diet; 54th Imperial Diet; 55th Imperial Diet; 56th Imperial Diet
- Predecessor: First Wakatsuki Cabinet
- Successor: Hamaguchi Cabinet

The Tanaka Giichi Cabinet is the 26th Cabinet of Japan led by Tanaka Giichi from April 20, 1927 to July 2, 1929.

== Cabinet ==
Ministers
Portfolio	Name	Political party	Term start	Term end
Prime Minister	Baron Tanaka Giichi	Rikken Seiyūkai	April 20, 1927	July 2, 1929
Minister for Foreign Affairs	Baron Tanaka Giichi	Rikken Seiyūkai	April 20, 1927	July 2, 1929
Minister of Home Affairs	Suzuki Kisaburō	Independent	April 20, 1927	May 4, 1928
Minister of Home Affairs	Baron Tanaka Giichi	Rikken Seiyūkai	May 4, 1928	May 23, 1928
Minister of Home Affairs	Mochizuki Keisuke	Rikken Seiyūkai	May 23, 1928	July 2, 1929
Minister of Finance	Takahashi Korekiyo	Rikken Seiyūkai	April 20, 1927	June 2, 1927
Minister of Finance	Mitsuchi Chūzō	Rikken Seiyūkai	June 2, 1927	July 2, 1929
Minister of the Army	Yoshinori Shirakawa	Military (Army)	April 20, 1927	July 2, 1929
Minister of the Navy	Keisuke Okada	Military (Navy)	April 20, 1927	July 2, 1929
Minister of Justice	Yoshimichi Hara	Independent	April 20, 1927	July 2, 1929
Minister of Education	Mitsuchi Chūzō	Rikken Seiyūkai	April 20, 1927	June 2, 1927
Minister of Education	Mizuno Rentarō	Rikken Seiyūkai	June 2, 1927	May 25, 1928
Minister of Education	Kazue Shōda	Independent	May 25, 1928	July 2, 1929
Minister of Agriculture, Forestry and Fisheries	Yamamoto Teijirō	Rikken Seiyūkai	April 20, 1927	July 2, 1929
Minister of Commerce and Industry	Nakahashi Tokugorō	Rikken Seiyūkai	April 20, 1927	July 2, 1929
Minister of Communications	Mochizuki Keisuke	Rikken Seiyūkai	April 20, 1927	May 23, 1928
Minister of Communications	Fusanosuke Kuhara	Rikken Seiyūkai	May 23, 1928	July 2, 1929
Minister of Railways	Ogawa Heikichi	Rikken Seiyūkai	April 20, 1927	July 2, 1929
Minister of Colonial Affairs	Baron Tanaka Giichi	Rikken Seiyūkai	June 10, 1929	July 2, 1929
Chief Cabinet Secretary	Ichirō Hatoyama	Rikken Seiyūkai	April 20, 1927	July 2, 1929
Director-General of the Cabinet Legislation Bureau	Yonezō Maeda	Rikken Seiyūkai	April 20, 1927	July 2, 1929
Parliamentary Vice-Ministers
Portfolio	Name	Political party	Term start	Term end
Parliamentary Vice-Minister for Foreign Affairs	Mori Kaku	Rikken Seiyūkai	April 22, 1927	April 27, 1929
Parliamentary Vice-Minister for Foreign Affairs	Vacant		April 27, 1929	July 2, 1929
Parliamentary Vice-Minister of Home Affairs	Mutō Kinkichi	Rikken Seiyūkai	April 22, 1927	April 23, 1928
Parliamentary Vice-Minister of Home Affairs	Vacant		April 23, 1928	May 29, 1928
Parliamentary Vice-Minister of Home Affairs	Kiyoshi Akita	Rikken Seiyūkai	May 29, 1928	July 2, 1929
Parliamentary Vice-Minister of Finance	Ōguchi Kiroku	Rikken Seiyūkai	April 22, 1927	July 2, 1929
Parliamentary Vice-Minister of the Army	Takeuchi Tomojirō	Rikken Seiyūkai	April 22, 1927	July 2, 1929
Parliamentary Vice-Minister of the Navy	Uchida Nobuya	Rikken Seiyūkai	April 22, 1927	July 2, 1929
Parliamentary Vice-Minister of Justice	Hamada Kunimatsu	Rikken Seiyūkai	April 22, 1927	July 2, 1929
Parliamentary Vice-Minister of Education	Tatsunosuke Yamazaki	Rikken Seiyūkai	April 22, 1927	April 30, 1929
Parliamentary Vice-Minister of Education	Vacant		April 30, 1929	July 2, 1929
Parliamentary Vice-Minister of Agriculture, Forestry and Fisheries	Azuma Takeshi	Rikken Seiyūkai	April 22, 1927	July 2, 1929
Parliamentary Vice-Minister of Commerce and Industry	Yoshiue Shōichirō	Rikken Seiyūkai	April 22, 1927	July 2, 1929
Parliamentary Vice-Minister of Communications	Kiyoshi Akita	Rikken Seiyūkai	April 22, 1927	May 29, 1928
Parliamentary Vice-Minister of Communications	Hirooka Uichirō	Rikken Seiyūkai	May 29, 1928	July 2, 1929
Parliamentary Vice-Minister of Railways	Ueno Yasutarō	Rikken Seiyūkai	April 22, 1927	July 2, 1929
Parliamentary Undersecretaries
Portfolio	Name	Political party	Term start	Term end
Parliamentary Undersecretary for Foreign Affairs	Etsujirō Uehara	Rikken Seiyūkai	April 22, 1927	April 19, 1929
Parliamentary Undersecretary for Foreign Affairs	Vacant		April 19, 1929	July 2, 1929
Parliamentary Undersecretary of Home Affairs	Katō Kumeshirō	Rikken Seiyūkai	April 22, 1927	July 2, 1929
Parliamentary Undersecretary of Finance	Yamaguchi Giichi	Rikken Seiyūkai	April 22, 1927	July 2, 1929
Parliamentary Undersecretary of the Army	Kōkusa Miyozō	Rikken Seiyūkai	April 22, 1927	March 9, 1928
Parliamentary Undersecretary of the Army	Hatta Sōkichi	Rikken Seiyūkai	March 9, 1928	July 2, 1929
Parliamentary Undersecretary of the Navy	Matsumoto Kunpei	Rikken Seiyūkai	April 22, 1927	July 2, 1929
Parliamentary Undersecretary of Justice	Kurozumi Nariaki	Rikken Seiyūkai	April 22, 1927	July 17, 1928
Parliamentary Undersecretary of Justice	Vacant		July 17, 1928	July 24, 1928
Parliamentary Undersecretary of Justice	Isobe Hisashi	Rikken Seiyūkai	July 24, 1928	July 2, 1929
Parliamentary Undersecretary of Education	Andō Masazumi	Rikken Seiyūkai	April 22, 1927	April 27, 1929
Parliamentary Undersecretary of Education	Vacant		April 27, 1929	July 2, 1929
Parliamentary Undersecretary of Agriculture, Forestry and Fisheries	Sunada Shigemasa	Rikken Seiyūkai	April 22, 1927	July 2, 1929
Parliamentary Undersecretary of Commerce and Industry	Makino Ryōzō	Rikken Seiyūkai	April 22, 1927	July 2, 1929
Parliamentary Undersecretary of Communications	Mukai Shizuo	Rikken Seiyūkai	April 22, 1927	July 2, 1929
Parliamentary Undersecretary of Railways	Shiga Watari	Rikken Seiyūkai	April 22, 1927	July 2, 1929
