= Shigeru Yoshida (civil servant) =

Japanese politician

- 吉田 茂
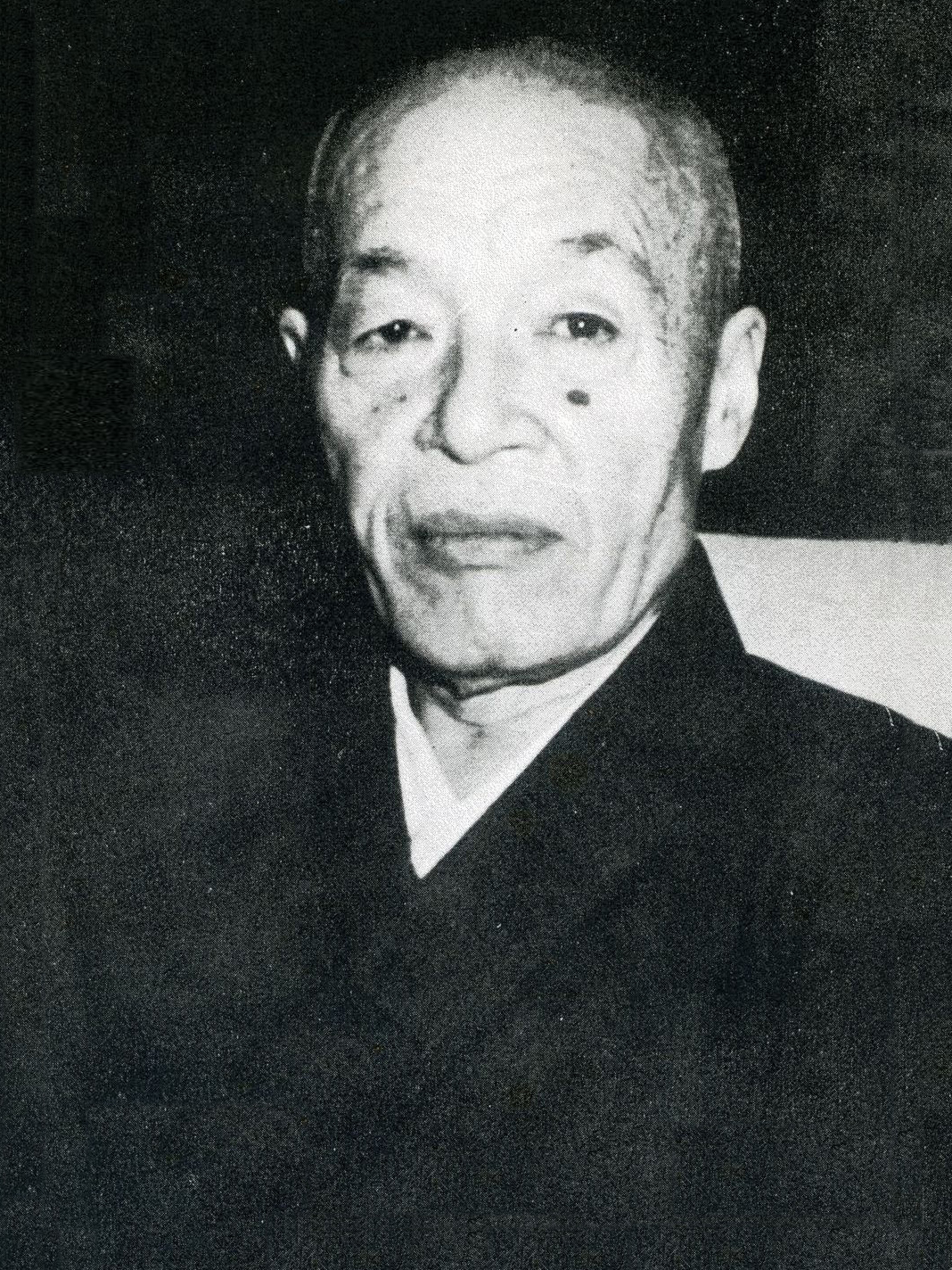
- Shigeru Yoshida, c. 1950

Minister of Munitions
- In office 19 December 1944 – 7 April 1945
- Prime Minister: Kuniaki Koiso
- Preceded by: Ginjirō Fujiwara
- Succeeded by: Teijirō Toyoda

Governor of Fukuoka Prefecture
- In office 1 July 1943 – 19 December 1944
- Monarch: Hirohito
- Preceded by: Kiyoshi Honma
- Succeeded by: Kuichirō Totsuka

Minister of Health and Welfare
- In office 16 January 1940 – 22 July 1940
- Prime Minister: Mitsumasa Yonai
- Preceded by: Kiyoshi Akita
- Succeeded by: Eiji Yasui

Chief Cabinet Secretary
- In office 20 October 1934 – 11 May 1935
- Prime Minister: Keisuke Okada
- Preceded by: Isao Kawada
- Succeeded by: Takekai Shirane

Member of the House of Peers
- In office 12 January 1937 – 16 February 1946 Nominated by the Emperor

Personal details
- Born: 2 September 1885 Usuki, Ōita, Japan
- Died: 9 December 1954 (aged 69) Shinjuku, Tokyo, Japan
- Party: Independent
- Education: Tokyo Imperial University

Shigeru Yoshida (吉田 茂, Yoshida Shigeru; 2 September 1885 – 9 December 1954) was a Japanese bureaucrat and politician in the Empire of Japan, serving as a member of the House of Peers, Chief Cabinet Secretary, governor of Fukuoka Prefecture and twice as a cabinet minister.

== Biography ==
Yoshida was born in what is now part of the city of Usuki, Ōita, where his father worked as an official of the Bank of Japan. He graduated from the Law Department of Tokyo Imperial University in 1911, and also passed the highest level of the civil service examinations. In late 1911, he entered the Home Ministry, serving as Deputy Mayor of Tokyo in 1923. Following the Great Kantō earthquake, he was assigned to the Reconstruction Bureau within the Home Ministry, and later to the bureau in charge of regulating Shinto shrines under State Shintoism.

From October 1934 to May 1935, Yoshida served as Chief Cabinet Secretary under the Okada administration and was also appointed to a seat on the Planning Board. In 1937, he was appointed to the Upper House of the Diet of Japan. He was asked to become Minister of Welfare under the Yonai administration from January to July 1940, and was appointed governor of Fukuoka Prefecture in July 1943 by Prime Minister Hideki Tōjō. Under Tōjō’s successor, Kuniaki Koiso, Yoshida was recalled to Tokyo to serve as Minister of Munitions from December 1944 to April 1945. As Munitions Minister, he attempted to construct underground armament-manufacturing facilities to protect them from aerial bombing.

Following the end of World War II, Yoshida, along with all other members of the former Japanese government was purged from public office by the Supreme Commander of the Allied Powers, but was not arrested. In 1953, a year after the end of the Occupation of Japan, he became secretary general of the Association of Shinto Shrines. He died on 9 December 1954.

== Another Yoshida ==
The bureaucrat Shigeru Yoshida was often confused with another politician of similar age with exactly the same name: Shigeru Yoshida served as post-war Foreign Minister and Prime Minister of Japan. The bureaucrat Shigeru Yoshida was often referred to as "Mejiro Yoshida" from the location of his residence in Mejiro, Tokyo, whereas the other Yoshida was referred to as "Ōiso Yoshida" after the location of his summer villa in Ōiso, Kanagawa.

Political offices
Preceded by Ginjirō Fujiwara	Minister of Munitions; Dec 1944 - Apr 1945	Succeeded by Teijirō Toyoda
Preceded by Kiyoshi Akita	Minister of Health and Welfare; Jan 1940 - Jul 1940	Succeeded by Eiji Yasui
Preceded by Isao Kawada	Chief Cabinet Secretary; Oct 1934 - May 1935	Succeeded by Takekai Shirane
