= Zentarō Kosaka =

Japanese politician (1912–2000)

- 小坂 善太郎
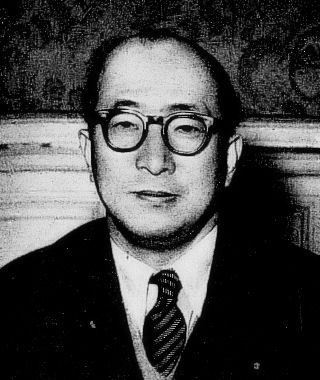
- Kosaka in 1960

Minister for Foreign Affairs
- In office 15 September 1976 – 24 December 1976
- Prime Minister: Takeo Miki
- Preceded by: Kiichi Miyazawa
- Succeeded by: Iichirō Hatoyama
- In office 8 December 1960 – 18 July 1962
- Prime Minister: Hayato Ikeda
- Preceded by: Aiichiro Fujiyama
- Succeeded by: Masayoshi Ōhira

Director-General of the Economic Planning Agency
- In office 22 December 1972 – 25 November 1973
- Prime Minister: Kakuei Tanaka
- Preceded by: Kiichi Arita
- Succeeded by: Tsuneo Uchida

Chairman of the National Public Safety Commission
- In office 1 July 1954 – 1 October 1954
- Prime Minister: Shigeru Yoshida
- Preceded by: Office established
- Succeeded by: Naoshi Ohara

Minister of Labour
- In office 21 May 1953 – 16 June 1954
- Prime Minister: Shigeru Yoshida
- Preceded by: Kuichiro Totsuka
- Succeeded by: Saburo Chiba

Member of the House of Representatives
- In office 7 July 1986 – 24 January 1990
- Preceded by: Shusei Tanaka
- Succeeded by: Kenji Kosaka
- Constituency: Nagano 1st
- In office 11 April 1946 – 28 November 1983
- Preceded by: Constituency established
- Succeeded by: Shusei Tanaka
- Constituency: Nagano at-large (1946–1947); Nagano 1st (1947–1983)

Personal details
- Born: 23 January 1912 Nagano City, Nagano, Japan
- Died: 26 November 2000 (aged 88) Ōta, Tokyo, Japan
- Party: Liberal Democratic
- Other political affiliations: Independent (1946–1947); Democratic (1947–1950); Liberal (1950–1955)
- Children: Kenji Kosaka
- Relatives: Eigo Fukai (uncle); Sonyu Ōtani (father-in-law)
- Education: Hitotsubashi University

Zentarō Kosaka (小坂 善太郎, Kosaka Zentarō; 23 January 1912 – 26 November 2000) was a Japanese politician who served two terms as foreign minister and as labour minister.

== Early life and education ==
Hailing from Nagano Prefecture, Kosaka was born into a politician family on 23 January 1912. His grandfather, Zennosuke Kosaka, was the founder of the daily Shinano Mainichi and a politician. His father, Junzo Kosaka, was also a politician. His younger brother, Tokusaburo Kosaka, was a leading politician of the Liberal Democratic Party. Zentaro Kosaka was a graduate of Tokyo University of Commerce (present-day Hitotsubashi University).

== Career ==
After graduation, Kosaka began his career at the Mitsubishi Bank. Then he worked for Shin-Etsu Chemical which was established by his father, Junzo Kosaka. Later he joined the Liberal Democratic Party. In the party he was part of the Kōchikai faction headed by Hayato Ikeda.

Kosaka first became a member of the House of Representatives in 1946, being a representative for the Nagano Prefecture. He served in the Lower House for 16 terms and held a variety of ministerial posts. On 6 September 1960, Kosaka visited Seoul, becoming the first Japanese cabinet member to visit South Korea since 1945. He was appointed labour minister in the Yoshida Cabinet, and foreign minister in the cabinets of Hayato Ikeda and Takeo Miki.

Kosaka's first term as foreign minister was from 19 July 1960 to 18 July 1962. Assuming the post shortly after the massive Anpo Protests against the US-Japan Security Treaty, Kosaka's most pressing task was to restore good relations with the United States. Kosaka recalled, "In the immediate aftermath of the Security Treaty riots, repairing US-Japan relations was our single biggest concern." To this end, Kosaka visited the United States several times and helped arrange a summit meeting between Prime Minister Ikeda and President John F. Kennedy in Washington D.C. in June 1961.

In August 1966, Kosaka and Yoshimi Furui headed an eight-member LDP delegation to visit China. They both held the views of right-conservatism, arguing for Japan's independence from the US and normalized relations with China. After the visit, Kosaka developed a policy report, called the Kosaka Report, which was submitted to the LDP's policy affairs research council.

In 1968, Kosaka stated his desire to visit Mongolia to search for the viability of economic assistance towards the country. In 1970, Kosaka argued that Japan should declare a "no-war" notice in order to reduce tensions between Japan and China. He was also the head of political affairs research committee in the LDP during the same period. He also served as the head of economic planning agency during the term of the then Prime Minister Kakuei Tanaka. On 24 July 1972, Tanaka also appointed him as chairman of the newly founded Council for the normalization of Japan-China relations in the LDP. The task of the council that consisted of 312 members was to reach a consensus, since the pro-Taiwan and pro-Peking factions over the whole peace treaty issue emerged in the party. IN September 1972, Kosaka visited Pekin as special envoy of the prime minister Tanaka.

Kosaka was secondly appointed foreign minister in 1976. In 1976, he called for a reform of the UN security council at the UN general assembly. At the beginning of the 1980s, he served as the chairman of the LDP's foreign affairs research council. Kosaka retired from politics in 1990.

== Personal life ==
Kosaka's son, Kenji Kosaka, is a LDP politician and former minister of education. Kosaka participated his son's election campaign for the lower house in the Nagano district in 1990.

=== Awards and legacy ===
Kosaka was awarded the U.N. peace prize in 1982. The Chinese restaurant of Okura Hotel in Tokyo was named by Kosaka.

== Death ==
Kosaka died of renal failure in Tokyo on 26 November 2000. He was 88.

House of Representatives (Japan)
| Preceded by Etsujirō Uehara | Chair, Budget Committee of the House of Representatives of Japan; 1950–1951 | Succeeded by Toichiro Tsukada |
Party political offices
| Preceded by Mikio Mizuta | Chairman of the Policy Research Council, Liberal Democratic Party; 1971–1972 | Succeeded by Yoshio Sakurauchi |
Political offices
| Preceded by Kuichiro Totsuka | Minister of Labour; 1953–1954 | Succeeded by Saburo Chiba |
| Preceded by Office established | Chairman of the National Public Safety Commission; 1954 | Succeeded by Naoshi Ohara |
| Preceded by Aiichiro Fujiyama | Minister for Foreign Affairs; 1960–1962 | Succeeded by Masayoshi Ōhira |
| Preceded by Kiichi Arita | Minister of State, Head of the Economic Planning Agency; 1972–1973 | Succeeded by Tsuneo Uchida |
| Preceded by Kiichi Miyazawa | Minister for Foreign Affairs; 1976 | Succeeded by Iichirō Hatoyama |
