= Banboku Ōno =

Japanese politician (1890–1964)

- 大野 伴睦
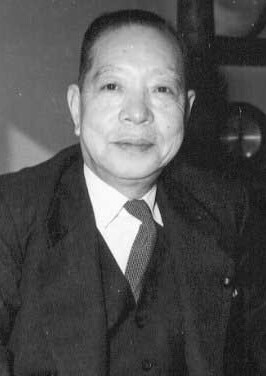

Vice President of the Liberal Democratic Party
- In office July 1961 – May 1964
- President: Hayato Ikeda
- Secretary-General: Shigesaburō Maeo
- Preceded by: Himself (1960)
- Succeeded by: Shojiro Kawashima
- In office July 1957 – July 1960
- President: Nobusuke Kishi
- Secretary-General: Shojiro Kawashima; Takeo Fukuda; Shojiro Kawashima
- Preceded by: Position established
- Succeeded by: Himself (1961)

Director-General of the Hokkaido Development Agency
- In office 14 January 1954 – 27 July 1954
- Prime Minister: Shigeru Yoshida
- Preceded by: Kuichirō Totsuka
- Succeeded by: Taketora Ogata

Speaker of the House of Representatives
- In office 26 August 1952 – 14 March 1953
- Monarch: Hirohito
- Deputy: Nobuyuki Iwamoto
- Preceded by: Jōji Hayashi
- Succeeded by: Yasujirō Tsutsumi

Member of the House of Representatives
- In office 10 April 1946 – 29 May 1964
- Preceded by: Constituency established
- Succeeded by: Akira Ōno
- Constituency: Gifu at-large (1946–1947); Gifu 1st (1947–1964)
- In office 20 February 1930 – 29 April 1942
- Preceded by: Eikichi Hikita
- Succeeded by: Keiichi Ishigure
- Constituency: Gifu 1st

Personal details
- Born: September 20, 1890 Yamagata, Gifu, Japan
- Died: May 29, 1964 (aged 73) Shinjuku, Tokyo, Japan
- Party: Liberal Democratic (1955–1964)
- Other political affiliations: Seiyūkai (1930–1940); Independent (1940–1945); JLP (1945–1948); DLP (1948–1950); LP (1950–1955)
- Children: Akira Ōno
- Relatives: Yasutada Ōno (grandson); Tsuyako Ōno (daughter-in-law)
- Education: Meiji University

Banboku Ōno (大野 伴睦, Ōno Banboku; September 20, 1890 – May 29, 1964) was a Japanese politician who was a powerful faction leader within the Liberal Democratic Party (LDP) in the early postwar period, serving stints as Speaker of the House of Representatives, Secretary General of the Liberal Party, and Vice President of the Liberal Democratic Party.

Viewed as an archetypical "party politician," as opposed to the "ex-bureaucrat" elected leaders he staunchly opposed, Ōno was affectionately nicknamed "Ban-chan." He was also known for his colorful sayings, such as noting that just as with yakuza gangsters, "politics is all about giri and ninjō", and "A monkey that falls from a tree is still a monkey, but a politician that loses an election is just a person".

== Early life ==
Banboku Ōno was born in Yamagata city in Gifu Prefecture on September 20, 1890. He attended the Meiji University Faculty of Law, but was expelled after taking part in rioting during the 1913 Taishō political crisis. Thereafter, he joined the Rikken Seiyūkai political party's extra-parliamentary pressure group (ingaidan), which used various intimidation tactics to pressure people into voting for the Seiyūkai party as well as to disrupt meetings of other political parties. Ōno proved effective at this kind of work, and eventually rose to become one of the leaders of the ingaidan. Ōno's early involvement in the political ruffianism of the ingaidan also allowed him to forge lifelong ties with yakuza groups and right-wing gangsters who would continue to aid him throughout his political career. Ōno was proud of these connections, and even in his later years as a well-established elected leader, he continued to openly participate in public gatherings of yakuza bosses.

== Political career ==
Ōno was elected to the Tokyo Municipal Assembly in 1923, where he served as an Assemblyman for 9 years and participated in a delegation to the United States to thank Americans for their support in reconstructing Tokyo following the 1923 Great Kantō earthquake.

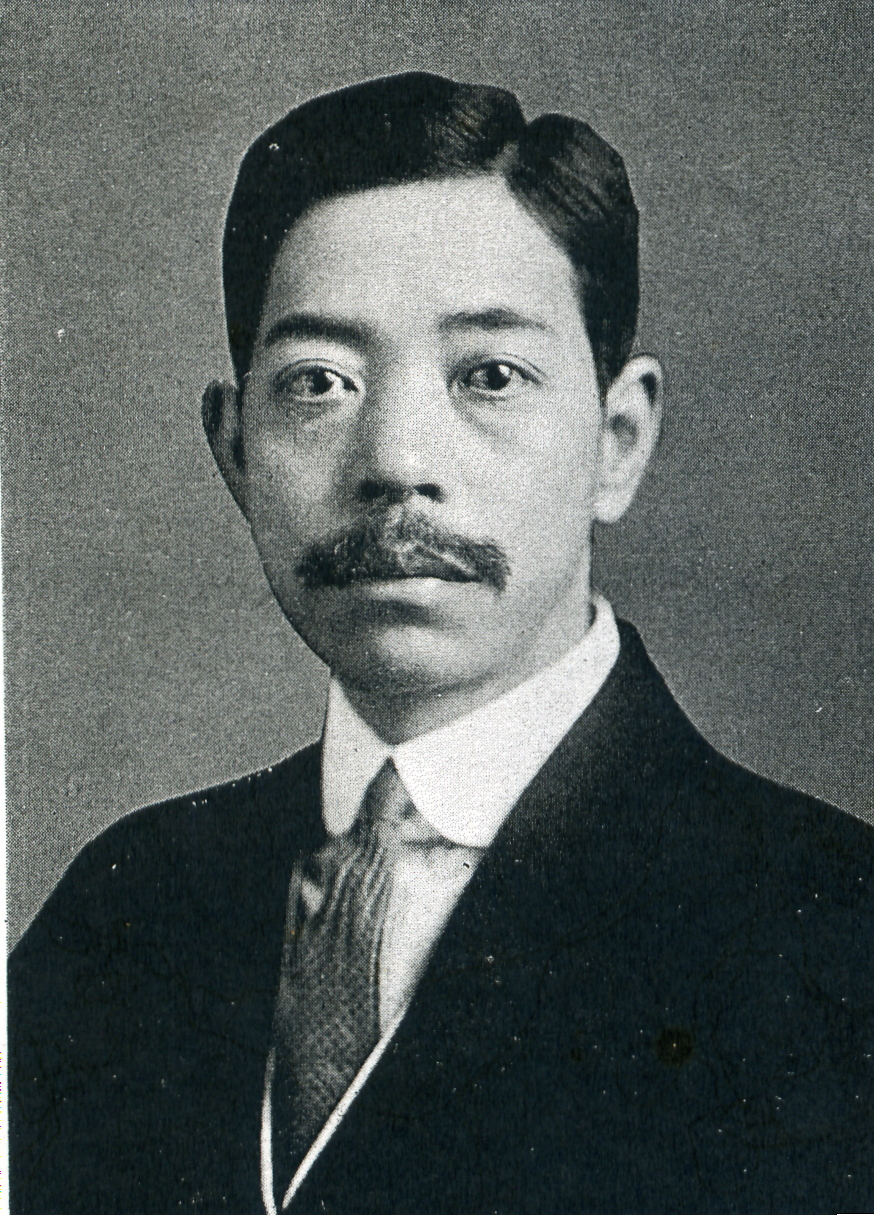
Ōno Banboku in 1932

In 1930, Ōno was elected to the House of Representatives for the first time, representing Gifu's 1st district, and became a member of the Ichirō Hatoyama faction in the Diet. In the 1942 election Ōno sided with his mentor Hatoyama in refusing to join the Imperial Rule Assistance Association, running as a "non-recommended" candidate and thereby losing his seat in the Diet.

Following the war, Ōno assisted Hatoyama in forming the Liberal Party, and was reelected to the Diet in 1946. When Hatoyama and Liberal Party secretary-general Ichirō Kōno were purged by the US Occupation, Ōno stepped in as secretary general from 1946 to 1948, assisting Shigeru Yoshida during his first stint as prime minister.

In 1948, Ōno was implicated in the Showa Denko corruption scandal and put on trial, although he was eventually acquitted in 1951.

Having recovered his reputation, Ōno served as Speaker of the House of Representatives from 1952 to 1953, and then joined the Yoshida cabinet as Minister of State and Director of the Hokkaido Development Agency in 1953.

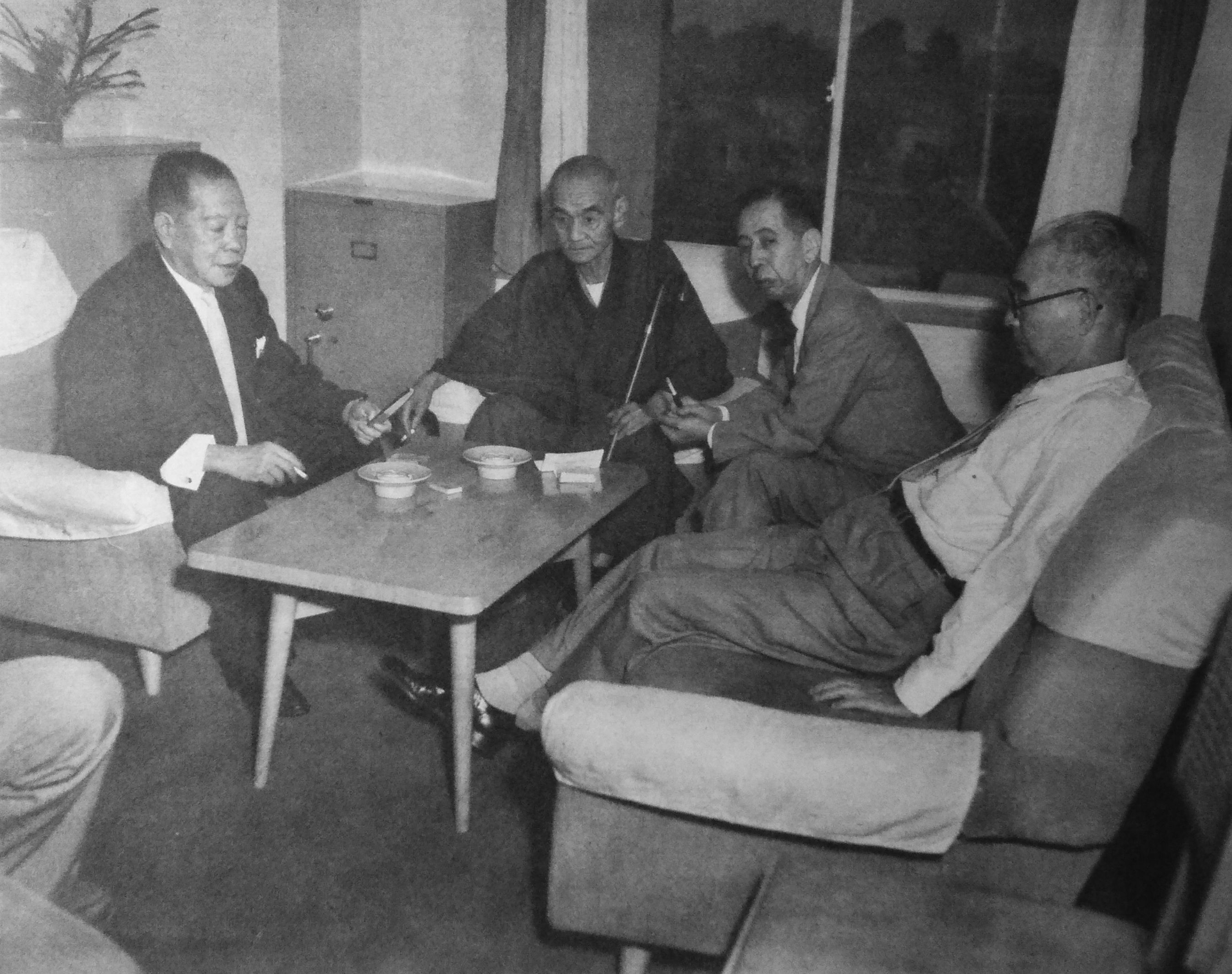
Conservative leaders meet to plot the merger of the Liberal and Democratic parties in July 1955. From left to right: Banboku Ōno, Bukichi Miki, Nobusuke Kishi, Mitsujirō Ishii

In 1955, in his capacity as Chairman of the Executive Council of the Liberal Party, Ōno played a major role in the formation of the Liberal Democratic Party (LDP) via the merging of the two major conservative parties (Liberal and Democratic). However, the sausage-making deals required to form the LDP, especially Hatoyama's supporting the views of Bukichi Miki over those of Ōno, led to a permanent rift between Ōno and his mentor. Shortly thereafter, Ōno left the Hatoyama faction and launched his own faction in the Diet, called the Hakuseikai (白政会), consisting of around 40 Diet members.

== Possible involvement in Kishi stabbing ==
In 1959, Prime Minister Nobusuke Kishi made it clear that he intended to seek an unprecedented third term in office, in violation of a longstanding norm that Japanese prime ministers serve only two terms before stepping aside to make way for the next person in line. To facilitate this, Kishi signed a secret written agreement with Ōno, also co-signed by fellow faction leaders and LDP heavyweights Eisaku Satō and Ichirō Kōno, stating that Ōno would be the next prime minister after Kishi's time in office concluded, followed in turn by Kōno and Satō, in exchange for all three leaders vocally supporting Kishi's administration and his bid for a third term. However, when Kishi was forced to resign in July 1960, he reneged on this agreement by throwing his support behind Hayato Ikeda for prime minister instead of Ōno. In particular, Kishi was angry that one of the main guarantors of the deal, Kōno, had openly opposed him during the Anpo protests of 1960, with tacit support from Ōno, while only his own brother Satō remained by his side. In fact, Kōno had even considered bolting the LDP along with Ōno, Takeo Miki, and Kenzō Matsumura. Although this plan fell through after much discussion, with the latter three ultimately refusing to join Kōno in exiting the party, by this time Kishi had come to view Ōno as one of the rebels that was undermining his government, and felt that the original terms of the secret agreement had been invalidated.

On July 14, 1960, Kishi was attacked by a knife-wielding assailant as he was leaving the prime minister's residence to host a garden party celebrating Ikeda's impending ascension to the premiership. The assailant was Taisuke Aramaki, an unemployed 65-year-old man affiliated with Ōno's private extra-parliamentary pressure group (ingaidan). Aramaki stabbed Kishi six times in the thigh, causing Kishi to bleed profusely, although Kishi survived because the blade had missed major arteries. Although the attack is often referred to as an "assassination attempt", Aramaki denied that he had intended to kill Kishi, later telling a reporter in an interview, "Yeah, I stabbed him six times, but if I wanted him dead, I would have just killed him." Many LDP politicians felt that the stabbing had been carried out at Ōno's behest, as revenge for Kishi's supporting Ikeda and thus betraying their written agreement from 1959.

== Final years and death ==
Following his ascension to the premiership, Ikeda conciliated Ōno by appointing him Vice President of the LDP. Ōno held this office until he died of a heart attack on May 29, 1964. After Ono's death, his Diet faction split into the Isshinkai (Funada faction) and the Ichiyōkai (Murakami faction).

Political offices
Preceded by Jōji Hayashi	Speaker of the House of Representatives; 1952–1953	Succeeded by Yasujirō Tsutsumi
