= Fourth Yoshida cabinet =

Cabinet of Japan (1952–1953)

Fourth Yoshida Cabinet
- 50th Cabinet of Japan

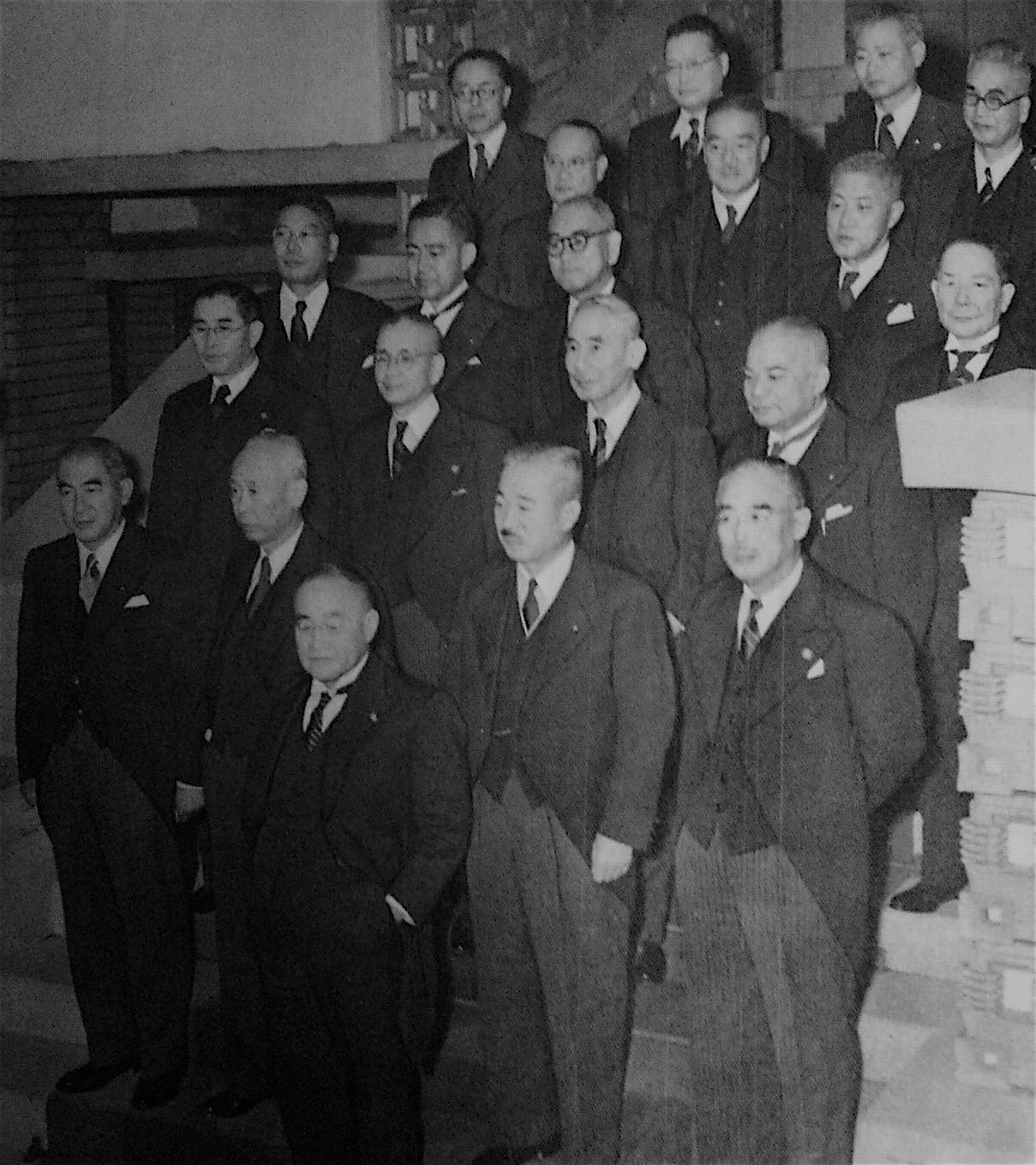
- Date formed: October 30, 1952
- Date dissolved: May 21, 1953

People and organisations
- Emperor: Shōwa
- Prime Minister: Shigeru Yoshida
- Deputy Prime Minister: Taketora Ogata
- Member parties: Liberal Party; Ryokufūkai
- Status in legislature: House of Representatives: Majority; House of Councillors: Coalition majority
- Opposition parties: Kaishintō; Rightist Socialist Party of Japan; Leftist Socialist Party of Japan; Japanese Communist Party; Labourers and Farmers Party

History
- Elections: 1952 general election 1953 councillors election
- Legislature term: 15th-16th National Diet
- Predecessor: Third Yoshida Cabinet (Third Reshuffle)
- Successor: Fifth Yoshida Cabinet

The Fourth Yoshida Cabinet was the 50th Cabinet of Japan. It was headed by Shigeru Yoshida from October 30, 1952 to May 21, 1953.

== Cabinet ==
Portfolio	Name	Political party	Term start	Term end
Prime Minister	Shigeru Yoshida	Liberal	October 30, 1952	May 21, 1953
Deputy Prime Minister (from November 28, 1952); Minister of State	Taketora Ogata	Liberal	October 30, 1952	May 21, 1953
Minister of Justice	Takeru Inukai	Liberal	October 30, 1952	May 21, 1953
Minister for Foreign Affairs	Katsuo Okazaki	Liberal	October 30, 1952	May 21, 1953
Minister of Finance	Mukai Tadaharu	Liberal	October 30, 1952	May 21, 1953
Minister of Education	Okano Kiyohide	Liberal	October 30, 1952	May 21, 1953
Minister of Health	Yamagata Katsumi	Liberal	October 30, 1952	May 21, 1953
Minister of Agriculture, Forestry and Fisheries	Ogasawara Sankurō	Liberal	October 30, 1952	December 5, 1952
Minister of Agriculture, Forestry and Fisheries	Hirokawa Kōzen	Liberal	December 5, 1952	March 3, 1953
Minister of Agriculture, Forestry and Fisheries	Tako Ichimin	Liberal	March 3, 1953	May 21, 1953
Minister of International Trade and Industry	Hayato Ikeda	Liberal	October 30, 1952	November 29, 1952
Minister of International Trade and Industry	Ogasawara Sankurō	Liberal	November 29, 1952	May 21, 1953
Minister of Transport	Mitsujirō Ishii	Liberal	October 30, 1952	May 21, 1953
Minister of Posts	Takase Sōtarō	Ryokufūkai	October 30, 1952	May 21, 1953
Minister of Labor	Totsuka Kuichirō	Liberal	October 30, 1952	May 21, 1953
Minister of Construction; Director of the Hokkaido Development Agency	Eisaku Satō	Liberal	October 30, 1952	February 10, 1953
Minister of Construction; Director of the Hokkaido Development Agency	Totsuka Kuichirō	Liberal	February 10, 1953	May 21, 1953
Minister of State; Director of the Administrative Management Agency; Director of the Autonomy Agency	Honda Ichirō	Liberal	October 30, 1952	May 21, 1953
Minister of State; Commissioner of the National Safety Agency	Kimura Tōkutarō	Liberal	October 30, 1952	May 21, 1953
Minister of State; Director of the Economic Deliberation Agency	Hayato Ikeda	Liberal	October 30, 1952	November 29, 1952
Minister of State; Director of the Economic Deliberation Agency	Ogasawara Sankurō	Liberal	November 29, 1952	March 3, 1953
Minister of State; Director of the Economic Deliberation Agency	Mikio Mizuta	Liberal	March 3, 1953	May 21, 1953
Minister of State	Ōnogi Hidejirō	Liberal	October 30, 1952	May 21, 1953
Minister of State	Hayashiya Kamejirō	Liberal	October 30, 1952	May 21, 1953
Chief Cabinet Secretary	Taketora Ogata	Liberal	October 30, 1952	March 24, 1953
Chief Cabinet Secretary	Kenji Fukunaga	Liberal	March 24, 1953	May 21, 1953
Director-General of the Cabinet Legislation Bureau	Satō Tatsuo	Independent	October 30, 1952	March 24, 1953
Deputy Chief Cabinet Secretary	Kanno Yoshimaru	Independent	October 30, 1952	March 23, 1953
Deputy Chief Cabinet Secretary	Tanaka Fuwazō	Liberal	March 28, 1953	May 21, 1953
Deputy Chief Cabinet Secretary	Eguchi Mitoru	Independent	October 30, 1952	May 21, 1953
