= Hisatsune Sakomizu =

Japanese politician

- 迫水 久常
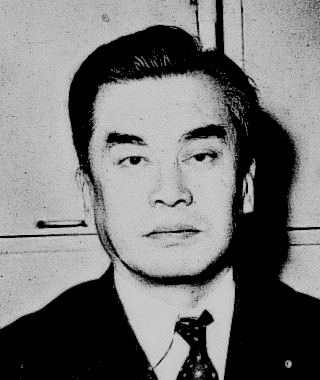

Minister of Posts and Telecommunications
- In office 18 July 1961 – 18 July 1962
- Prime Minister: Hayato Ikeda
- Preceded by: Yoshiteru Kogane
- Succeeded by: Sakae Teshima

Director-General of the Economic Planning Agency
- In office 8 December 1960 – 18 July 1961
- Prime Minister: Hayato Ikeda
- Preceded by: Watarō Kanno
- Succeeded by: Aiichiro Fujiyama

Chief Cabinet Secretary
- In office 7 April 1945 – 17 August 1945
- Prime Minister: Kantarō Suzuki
- Preceded by: Sōtarō Ishiwata
- Succeeded by: Taketora Ogata

Member of the House of Councillors
- In office 8 July 1956 – 25 July 1977
- Constituency: National district

Member of the House of Representatives
- In office 1 October 1952 – 24 January 1955
- Preceded by: Eikichi Kanbayashiyama
- Succeeded by: Eikichi Kanbayashiyama
- Constituency: Kagoshima 1st

Member of the House of Peers
- In office 15 August 1945 – 29 August 1945 Nominated by the Emperor

Personal details
- Born: 2 August 1902 Tokyo, Japan
- Died: 25 July 1977 (aged 74)
- Party: Liberal Democratic (1955–1977)
- Other political affiliations: Liberal (1950–1955)
- Relatives: Keisuke Okada (father-in-law)
- Education: Tokyo Imperial University

Hisatsune Sakomizu (迫水 久常, Sakomizu Hisatsune; 5 August 1902 – 25 July 1977) was a Japanese government official and politician before, during and after World War II.

== Career ==
Sakomizu is well known for serving as the chief secretary to Prime Minister Kantarō Suzuki's Cabinet (April–August 1945).

He was ordered by Suzuki to investigate and analyze the economic condition of Japan, and to give a written confidential report to Suzuki.

Sakomizu found that Japan's resources were rapidly decreasing, and that Japan would be unable to continue fighting the war for more than a few months. Both the air raids and the conquered Japanese territories captured by the United States of America had caused a "great disruption of land and sea communication and essential war production." In addition, coal and oil supplies were found to be in rapid decline, as well as health and support for the war effort.

Sakomizu served as a government officer of the Ministry of Finance in various governmental workplaces until 1945. After WW2, he became a member of the House of Representatives and then joined Liberal Democratic Party.

Political offices
Preceded by Yoshiteru Kogane	Minister of Posts and Telecommunications; 1961–1962	Succeeded by Sakae Teshima
Preceded by Wataro Kanno	Director of the Economic Planning Agency; 1960–1961	Succeeded by Aiichiro Fujiyama
Preceded by Sotaro Ishiwata	Chief Cabinet Secretary; 1945	Succeeded by Taketora Ogata
Academic offices
Preceded by New post	Principal of Kagoshima Junior College of Technology; 1966–1973	Succeeded by Post abolished
