= Taketora Ogata =

Japanese journalist and politician

- 緒方 竹虎
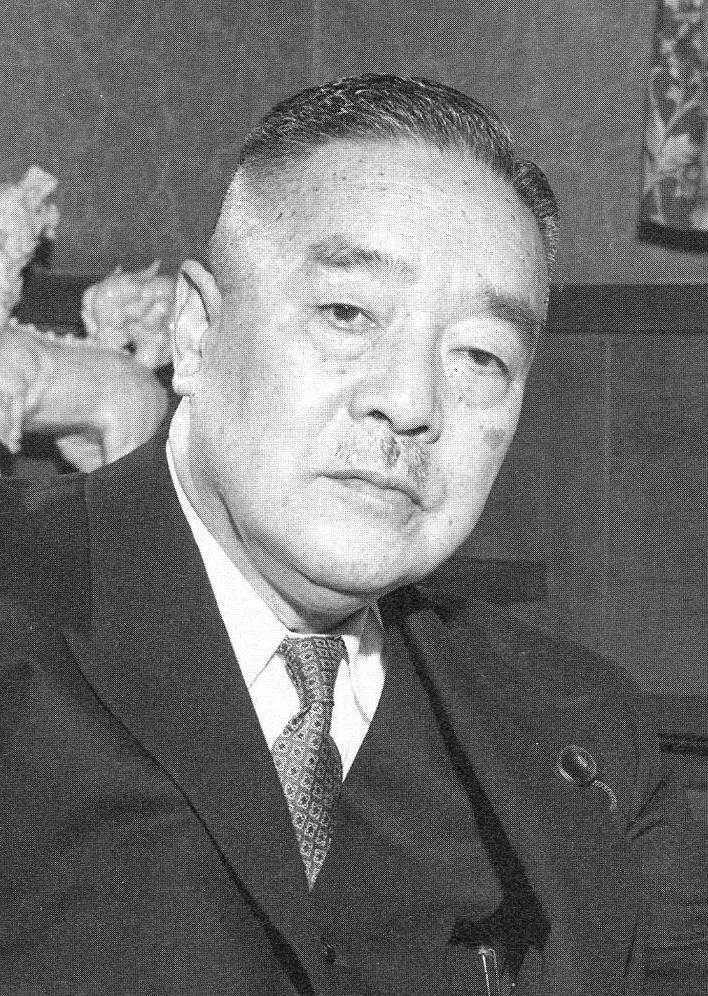

Deputy Prime Minister of Japan
- In office 28 November 1952 – 10 December 1954
- Prime Minister: Shigeru Yoshida
- Preceded by: Jōji Hayashi (1951)
- Succeeded by: Mamoru Shigemitsu

Director-General of the Hokkaido Development Agency
- In office 27 July 1954 – 10 December 1954
- Prime Minister: Shigeru Yoshida
- Preceded by: Banboku Ōno
- Succeeded by: Hideyuki Miyoshi

Chief Cabinet Secretary
- In office 30 October 1952 – 24 March 1953
- Prime Minister: Shigeru Yoshida
- Preceded by: Shigeru Hori
- Succeeded by: Kenji Fukunaga
- In office 15 August 1945 – 5 October 1945
- Prime Minister: Naruhiko Higashikuni
- Preceded by: Hisatsune Sakomizu
- Succeeded by: Daisaburō Tsugita

Member of the House of Representatives
- In office 2 October 1952 – 28 January 1956
- Preceded by: Gorō Morishima
- Succeeded by: Tsuneo Kangyū
- Constituency: Fukuoka 1st

Member of the House of Peers
- In office 15 August 1945 – 11 January 1946 Nominated by the Emperor

Personal details
- Born: 30 January 1888 Yamagata, Yamagata, Japan
- Died: 28 January 1956 (aged 67) Shinagawa, Tokyo, Japan
- Party: Liberal Democratic (1955–1956)
- Other political affiliations: IRAA (1940–1945); Liberal (1950–1955)
- Children: Shijuro Ogata
- Relatives: Atsushi Ogata (grandson); Sadako Ogata (daughter-in-law)
- Education: Fukuoka Prefectural Shuyukan High School
- Alma mater: Waseda University; Tokyo University of Commerce

Taketora Ogata (緒方 竹虎, Ogata Taketora; 30 January 1888 – 28 January 1956) was a Japanese journalist, Vice President of the Asahi Shimbun newspaper and later a politician. During the war, he joined the Imperial Rule Assistance Association. After the end of the war, he was purged from public service. Later, he became the Chief Secretary of the Fourth Yoshida Cabinet, Vice President and then President of the Liberal Party of Japan of Japan, but he died before becoming a prime minister.

== Biography ==
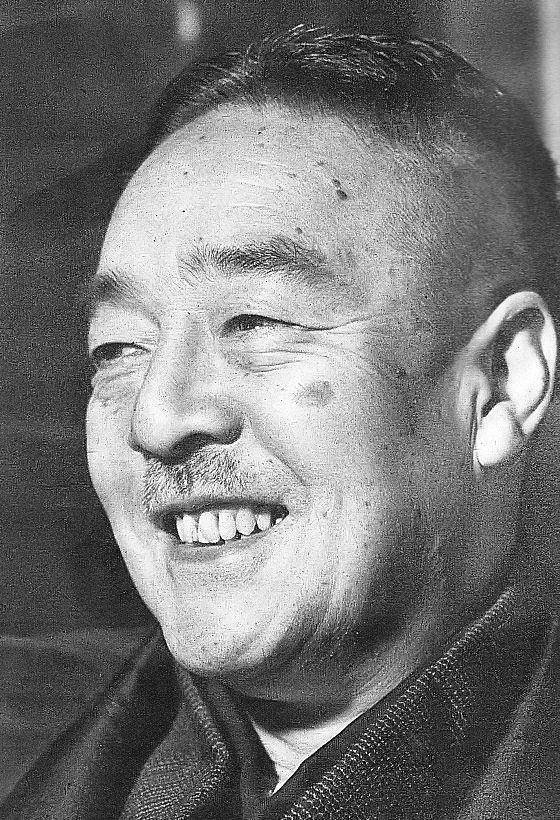
Taketora Ogata

He was born in Yamagata City, Yamagata Prefecture, in 1888 as the third son of Ogata Dōhei, the secretary of Yamagata Prefecture. At age 4, he went to Fukuoka city because his father became the secretary of Fukuoka Prefecture. He studied at Fukuoka Prefectural Shuyukan High School, where Seigō Nakano was his one-year senior. Of the same age was Daigorō Yasukawa. They later became influential friends. He graduated from Waseda University in 1911 and joined the Tokyo branch of the Osaka Asahi Shimbun. In 1925, Ogata became the editor of the Tokyo Asahi Shimbun. In 1928, he became one of the executive directors of the Asahi Shimbun. In 1936, he became the chief editor and in 1943 Vice-President of the Asahi Shimbun.

In 1944, Ogata went into the political world and became the Minister of State of the Koiso Cabinet, President of the Intelligence Bureau, and Vice President of the Imperial Rule Assistance Association. In April 1945, he resigned from the post. After the war, he became an adviser to the Higashikuni Cabinet. In December 1945, he was investigated for his war-time activities by the Allied Occupational authorities. In August 1946, he was purged from public service.

After 1952 when Japan regained independence, Ogata was elected as a member of the House of Representatives for three terms. In the same year, he became the Chief Cabinet Secretary of the 4th Yoshida Cabinet and the vice president of the ruling Liberal Party of Japan. In 1953, he became the President of the Liberal Party of Japan. However, he died in January 1956, while he was anticipating his election as prime minister.

== Works ==
- From the end of the Meiji era to the Pacific War Ogata Taketora Asahi Shimbun history editing room, 1951

Political offices
Preceded by Jōji Hayashi	Deputy Prime Minister of Japan; 1952–1954	Succeeded by Mamoru Shigemitsu
Preceded by Banboku Ōno	Minister of State; Director General of the Hokkaido Development Agency; 1954	Succeeded by Hideyuki Miyoshi
Preceded by Shigeru Hori	Chief Cabinet Secretary; 1952–1953	Succeeded by Kenji Fukunaga
Preceded by Hisatsune Sakomizu	Chief Cabinet Secretary; 1945	Succeeded by Daizaburō Tsugita
Government offices
Preceded by Hiroshi Shimomura	Director of the Cabinet Intelligence Bureau; 1945	Succeeded by Tatsuo Kawai
Preceded by Eiji Amō	Director of the Cabinet Intelligence Bureau; 1944–1945	Succeeded by Hiroshi Shimomura
Preceded by Fumio Gotō	Vice President of the Imperial Rule Assistance Association; 1944–1945	Association disbanded
Party political offices
New title	Head of Suiyōkai; 1955–1956	Succeeded by Mitsujirō Ishii
Preceded by Shigeru Yoshida	President of the Liberal Party; 1954–1955	Merged into Liberal Democratic Party
