= Kiyoshi Akita =

Japanese politician

Senior Third Rank Kiyoshi Akita
- 秋田 清
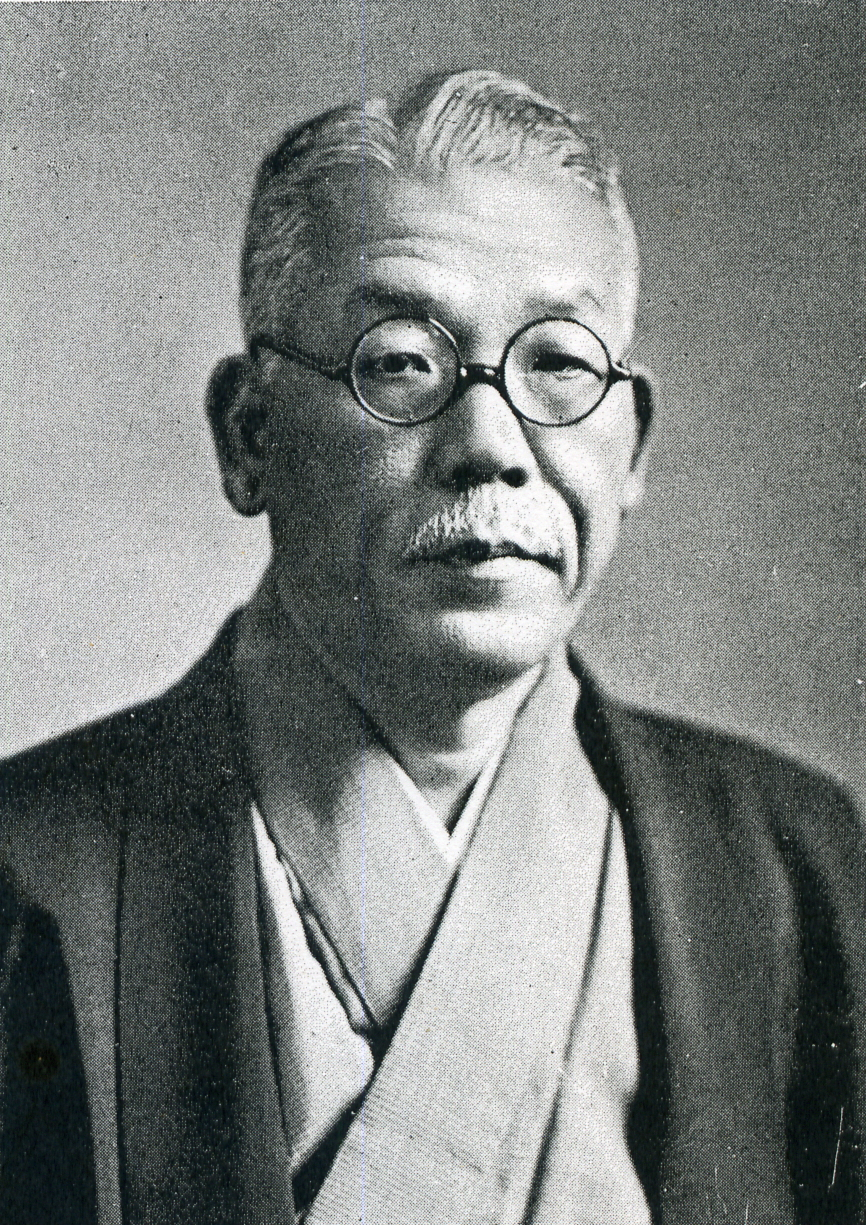
- Akita in 1932

Minister of Colonial Affairs
- In office 28 September 1940 – 18 July 1941
- Prime Minister: Fumimaro Konoe
- Preceded by: Yōsuke Matsuoka
- Succeeded by: Teijirō Toyoda

Minister of Health and Welfare
- In office 29 November 1939 – 16 January 1940
- Prime Minister: Nobuyuki Abe
- Preceded by: Naoshi Ohara
- Succeeded by: Shigeru Yoshida

Speaker of the House of Representatives
- In office 18 March 1932 – 12 December 1934
- Monarch: Hirohito
- Deputy: Etsujirō Uehara
- Preceded by: Nakamura Keijirō
- Succeeded by: Kunimatsu Hamada

Member of the House of Representatives; from Tokushima
- In office 20 April 1917 – 3 December 1944
- Preceded by: Miki Yokichirō
- Succeeded by: Constituency abolished (1945)
- Constituency: Counties district (1917–1920); 6th district (1920–1928); 2nd district (1928–1944)
- In office 15 May 1912 – 25 December 1914
- Preceded by: Hashimoto Hisataro
- Succeeded by: Miki Yokichirō
- Constituency: Counties district

Personal details
- Born: 29 September 1881 Miyoshi, Tokushima, Japan
- Died: 3 December 1944 (aged 63) Tokyo, Japan
- Party: IRAA (1940–1944)
- Other political affiliations: Independent (1912–1913); Rikken Dōshikai (1913–1916); Rikken Kokumintō (1916–1922); Kakushin Club (1922–1925); Rikken Seiyūkai (1925–1940)
- Children: Daisuke Akita
- Education: Nihon University; Chuo University

Kiyoshi Akita (秋田 清, Akita Kiyoshi; 29 August 1881 – 3 December 1944) was a politician and cabinet minister in the Empire of Japan, serving as a member of the Lower House of the Diet of Japan for ten terms, and twice as a cabinet minister. He also served as Speaker of the House from 1932-1934.

== Biography ==
Akita was born in Miyoshi District, Tokushima Prefecture and was a graduate from the predecessor of Nihon University with a graduate degree in law from the predecessor of Chuo University.

Akita was a judge in the Tokushima District Court, but left the legal profession to become a journalist for the Niroku Shipō, a newspaper of which he eventually became president. He won a seat in the Lower House of the Diet of Japan in the 1912 General Election with the support of the Rikken Dōshikai political party. He was subsequently a member of the Rikken Kokumintō, followed by the Rikken Seiyūkai, with whose support he became Speaker of the House from March 1932 to December 1934.

In 1939, under the Abe administration, Akita was asked to serve in the cabinet as Minister of Welfare. He joined the Taisei Yokusankai in 1940, and was appointed as Minister of Colonial Affairs in the 2nd Konoe administration from September 1940 – July 1941. Afterwards, he retired from public life and was awarded the 1st class of the Order of the Sacred Treasures. Akita died in 1944.

== Family ==
His son, Daisuke Akita was also a politician, serving in the post-war Diet, and as Minister of Justice in the 1970s.

Political offices
Preceded by Yōsuke Matsuoka	Minister of Colonial Affairs; 28 September 1940 – 18 July 1941	Succeeded by Teijirō Toyoda
Preceded by Naoshi Ohara	Minister of Health and Welfare; 29 November 1939 – 16 January 1940	Succeeded by Shigeru Yoshida
House of Representatives (Japan)
Preceded by Keijirō Nakamura	Speaker of the House of Representatives; 18 March 1932 – 12 December 1934	Succeeded by Kunimatsu Hamada
