= Nobuyuki Abe =

Japanese general, prime minister from 1939 to 1940

Senior Second Rank Nobuyuki Abe
- 阿部 信行
- Abe in 1939

Prime Minister of Japan
- In office 30 August 1939 – 16 January 1940
- Monarch: Hirohito
- Preceded by: Kiichirō Hiranuma
- Succeeded by: Mitsumasa Yonai

Governor-General of Korea
- In office 22 July 1944 – 12 September 1945
- Monarch: Hirohito
- Preceded by: Kuniaki Koiso
- Succeeded by: John Reed Hodge (as Military Governor of Korea); Terentii Shtykov (as Head Administrator of the Soviet Civil Administration)

Minister for Foreign Affairs
- In office 30 August 1939 – 25 September 1939
- Prime Minister: Himself
- Preceded by: Hachirō Arita
- Succeeded by: Kichisaburō Nomura

Member of the House of Peers
- In office 18 May 1942 – 22 February 1946 Nominated by the Emperor

Personal details
- Born: 24 November 1875 Kanazawa, Ishikawa, Japan
- Died: 7 September 1953 (aged 77) Suginami, Tokyo, Japan
- Party: Imperial Rule Assistance Association (1940–1945)
- Other political affiliations: Independent (before 1940)
- Spouse: Mitsuko Abe
- Relatives: Masazumi Inada (son-in-law); Shigeyoshi Inoue (son-in-law)
- Education: Imperial Japanese Army Academy; Army War College

Military service
- Allegiance: Empire of Japan
- Branch/service: Imperial Japanese Army
- Years of service: 1894–1936
- Rank: General
- Battles/wars: First Sino-Japanese War

General Nobuyuki Abe (Note: The script Noboyuki is also found) (阿部 信行, Abe Nobuyuki; 24 November 1875 – 7 September 1953) was a general in the Imperial Japanese Army, Prime Minister of Japan, and the last Governor-General of Korea.

== Early life and military career ==
Abe was born on 24 November 1875, in Kanazawa, Ishikawa Prefecture, the son of the former samurai Abe Nobumitsu, who had served the Kaga Domain. His brother-in-law was Imperial Japanese Navy admiral Shigeyoshi Inoue.

Abe attended Tokyo No.1 Middle School (Tokyo Metropolitan Hibiya High School) followed by No.4 High School. While he was still a student, he volunteered for military service during the First Sino-Japanese War.

After the war, Abe graduated from the Imperial Japanese Army Academy in November 1897. Commissioned a second lieutenant the following 27 June, he was promoted to lieutenant in November 1900 and attended the Army Artillery School, graduating in December 1901. Promoted to captain in November 1903, he enrolled in the 19th class of the Army War College, graduating in November 1907. The ultranationalist General Araki Sadao was one of his classmates.

Abe was promoted to major in December 1908, becoming an instructor at the Army War College in September 1909. In November 1910, he was posted to the German Empire as a military attaché at the Japanese embassy and became a supplementary attaché at the embassy in Vienna in February 1913.

Abe was promoted to lieutenant colonel in February 1915 and to colonel on 24 July 1918. He served as the commander of the 3rd Field Artillery Regiment from 1918 to 1921. In August 1918, his regiment was sent to Siberia during Japan's Siberian Intervention but never saw combat. He became secretary of the Army War College on 3 June 1921, and was promoted to major general on 15 August 1922. Appointed Director of the General Affairs Division of the Imperial General Staff on 6 August 1923, following the devastating earthquake of 1 September, he was placed in charge of overseeing martial law for the Kanto region on 3 September.

He was appointed director of military service affairs in the Army Ministry on 28 July 1926 and was promoted to lieutenant general on 5 March 1927. He later served as chief of the Military Affairs Bureau and as Vice Minister of the Army, which he had been appointed as on 10 August 1928. He commanded the 4th Infantry Division from 22 December 1930.

In January 1932, Abe was appointed to command the Japanese Taiwan Army and was promoted to full general on 19 June 1933. After serving on the Supreme War Council, he was placed on the reserve list on 10 March 1936.

== Premiership (1939–1940) ==
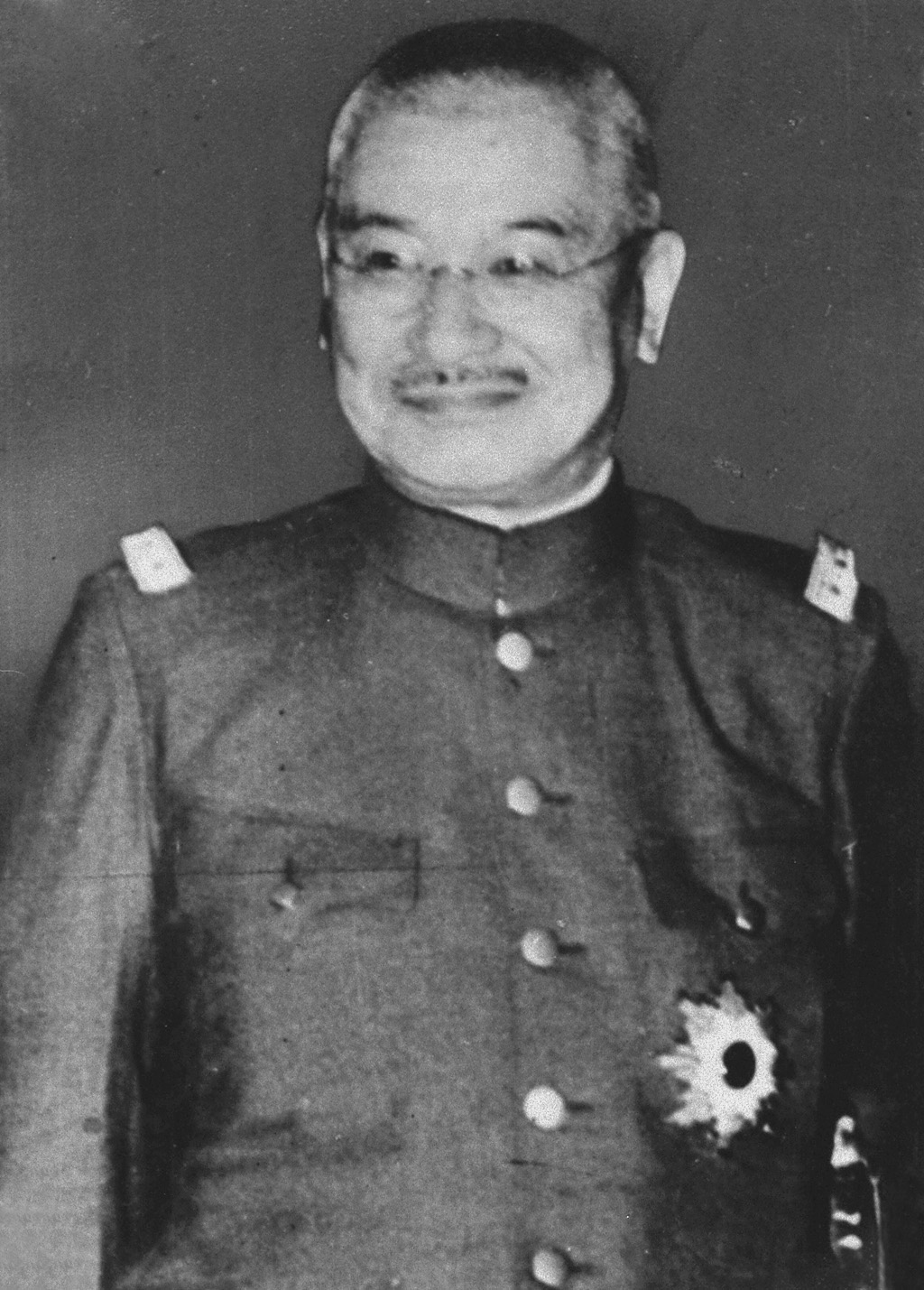
- Premiership of Nobuyuki Abe; 30 August 1939 – 16 January 1940
- Monarch: Emperor Shōwa
- Cabinet: Nobuyuki Abe Cabinet
- Party: Military (Army)
- Seat: Naikaku Sōri Daijin Kantei
- Emblem of the Government of Japan

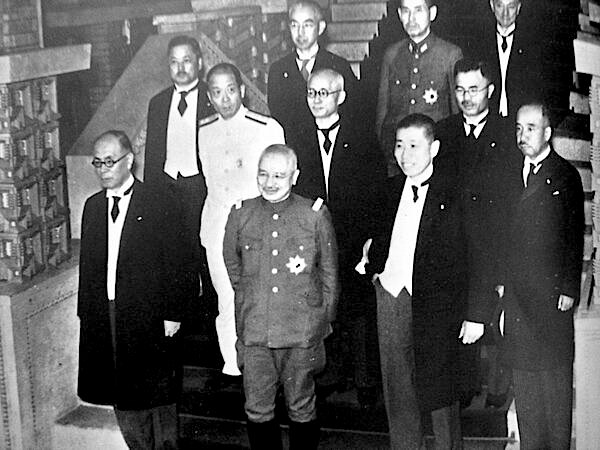
Nobuyuki Abe Cabinet (30 August 1939)

Abe was not the obvious first choice as prime minister after the collapse of the Hiranuma Kiichirō cabinet. From the civilian side, Konoe Fumimaro or Hirota Kōki were regarded as front-runners, but the Army and the ultranationalists strongly supported General Ugaki Kazushige. After genrō Saionji Kinmochi declared his lack of enthusiasm for any of those candidates, the Army was poised to have its way. However, Ugaki fell ill and was hospitalized. The interim War Minister General Abe was a compromise choice. He had the advantage of belonging to neither the Tōseiha nor the Kodoha political factions within the Army and was also supported as a relative political moderate by the Imperial Japanese Navy. On the other hand, he was despised by many senior Army officers for his total lack of any combat experience.

Abe became Prime Minister on 30 August 1939. He concurrently held the portfolio of Foreign Minister. During a reign which lasted only four months, Abe sought to end as quickly as possible the Second Sino-Japanese War, and to maintain Japan's neutrality in the growing European conflict. He also opposed to efforts by elements within the Army to form a political-military alliance with Nazi Germany and Fascist Italy. Increasingly lacking in support from either the military or the political parties, Abe was replaced by Mitsumasa Yonai in January 1940.

== Later career ==
Abe as the Japanese ambassador signing the Japan-Manchukuo-China joint declaration with Wang Jingwei and Zang Shiyi, 30 November 1940 in Nanjing

Three months later after his replacement as Prime Minister, Abe was sent by the army as a special envoy to China to advise the Japanese-supported regime of Wang Jingwei in Nanjing and to negotiate a treaty ensuring Japanese economic and military rights in northern China. However, he had some sympathy for Wang's Reorganized National Government. Abe remained as the Japanese ambassador to China in Nanjing until December 1940. After his return to Japan, Abe joined the House of Peers in 1942, and accepted the largely-ceremonial position as president of the Imperial Rule Assistance Political Association. He was appointed the 10th (and last) Governor-General of Korea in 1944 and 1945.

After World War II, Abe was purged from public office and arrested by the American occupation government. However, he was not charged with any war crimes and was soon released.

== Honours ==
- Grand Cordon of the Order of the Sacred Treasure (November 1930)
- Grand Cordon of the Order of the Rising Sun (April 1934)

== Notes ==
Political offices
Preceded by Eitarō Hata	Vice Minister of the Army; 1928–1930	Succeeded by Hajime Sugiyama
Preceded by Hachirō Arita	Minister of Foreign Affairs; 1939	Succeeded by Kichisaburō Nomura
Preceded by Kiichirō Hiranuma	Prime Minister of Japan; 1939–1940	Succeeded by Mitsumasa Yonai
Preceded by Kuniaki Koiso	Governor General of Korea; 1944–1945	Position abolished
Diplomatic posts
Preceded by Shigeru Kawagoe	Ambassador to China (Wang Jingwei regime); 1940	Succeeded by Kumataro Honda
Party political offices
Association established	President of the Imperial Rule Assistance Political Association; 1942–1944	Succeeded by Seizō Kobayashi
