= Mitsumasa Yonai =

Japanese admiral, prime minister in 1940

Junior Second Rank Mitsumasa Yonai
- 米内 光政
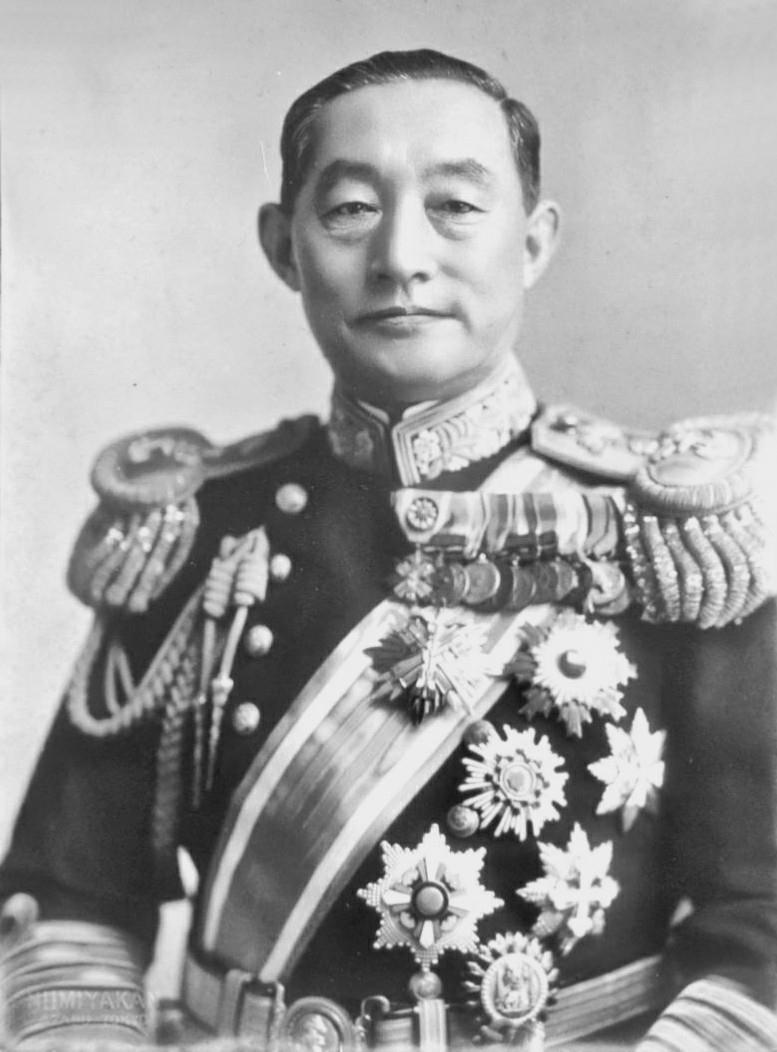

Prime Minister of Japan
- In office 16 January 1940 – 22 July 1940
- Monarch: Hirohito
- Preceded by: Nobuyuki Abe
- Succeeded by: Fumimaro Konoe

Minister of the Navy
- In office 2 February 1937 – 30 August 1939
- Prime Minister: Senjūrō Hayashi; Fumimaro Konoe; Hiranuma Kiichirō
- Preceded by: Osami Nagano
- Succeeded by: Yoshida Zengo
- In office 22 July 1944 – 1 December 1945
- Prime Minister: Kuniaki Koiso; Kantarō Suzuki; Naruhiko Higashikuni; Kijūrō Shidehara
- Preceded by: Naokuni Nomura
- Succeeded by: Office abolished

Personal details
- Born: 2 March 1880 Mitsuwari, Iwate, Japan
- Died: 20 April 1948 (aged 68)
- Resting place: Morioka Japan
- Party: Independent
- Spouse: Koma Yonai (m. 1906; died 1941)
- Relatives: Hiromasa Yonai (great-grandson)

Military service
- Allegiance: Empire of Japan
- Branch/service: Imperial Japanese Navy
- Years of service: 1901–1945
- Rank: Admiral
- Commands: Kasuga, Iwate, Fusō, Mutsu, First Expeditionary Fleet, IJN 3rd Fleet, Combined Fleet, IJN 1st Fleet

Mitsumasa Yonai (米内 光政, Yonai Mitsumasa; 2 March 1880 – 20 April 1948) was a Japanese navy officer and politician. He served as admiral in the Imperial Japanese Navy, Minister of the Navy, and Prime Minister of Japan in 1940.

== Early life and career ==
Yonai was born on 2 March 1880, in Mitsuwari, Iwate Prefecture, the first son of former samurai Yonai Nagamasa. Nagamasa had formerly served the Nanbu clan of the Morioka Domain.

He entered Kajichō Elementary School in 1886, and entered Morioka Middle School in 1890. After graduating from Morioka Middle School, he entered the Imperial Japanese Naval Academy.

He graduated from the 29th class Imperial Japanese Naval Academy in 1901, ranked 68 of 125 cadets (Japan Center for Asian Historical Records, n.d.). After midshipman service on the corvette Kongō, and cruiser Tokiwa he was commissioned as ensign in January 1903. He served in administrative positions until near the end of the Russo-Japanese War of 1904–1905, when he went to sea again on the destroyer Inazuma and the cruiser Iwate.

After the war, he served as chief gunnery officer on the cruiser Niitaka, battleship Shikishima, and cruiser Tone. After his promotion to lieutenant commander in December 1912, he graduated from the Naval War College and was assigned as naval attaché to Russia during the height of World War I, from 1915 to 1917. While overseas, he was promoted to commander; after the collapse of the Russian Empire, he was recalled to Japan and later became executive officer on the battleship Asahi. He rose to the rank of captain in December 1920 and was subsequently sent as naval attaché to Poland from 1921 to 1922.

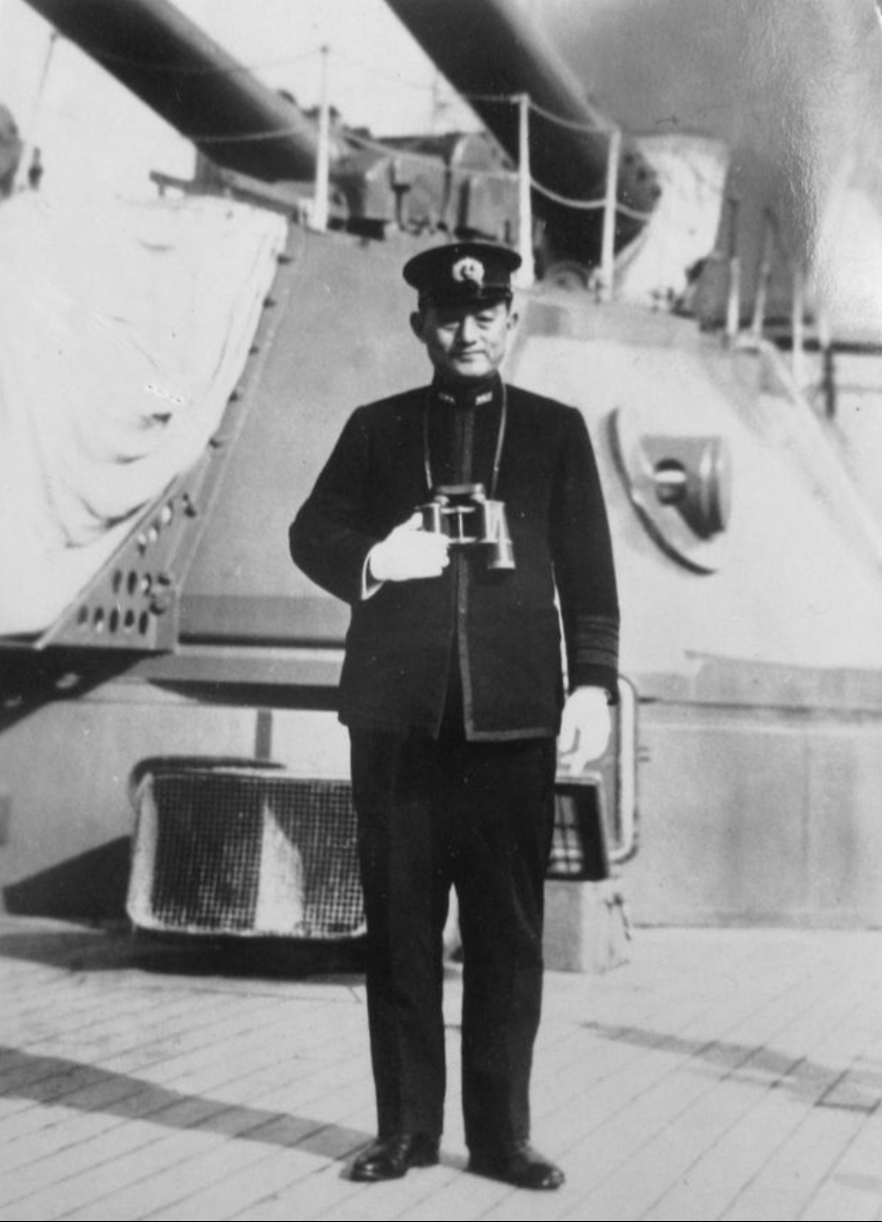
Commander as Chief of the Combined Fleet, 1936

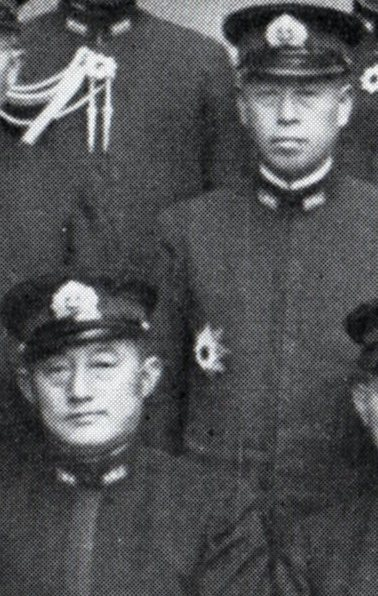
Yonai and Isoroku Yamamoto, 1936

On his return to Japan, he was captain of the cruisers Kasuga (1922–1923) and Iwate (1923–1924), and battleships Fusō (in 1924) and Mutsu (1924–1925). Yonai was promoted to rear admiral on December 1, 1925. He became Chief of the 3rd Section of the Imperial Japanese Navy General Staff in December 1926. Within the Navy General Staff, he served on the Technical Council of the Navy Technical Department. He was appointed Commander-in-Chief of the First Expeditionary Fleet, sent to the Yangtze River in China in December 1928. Following the success of this mission, he was promoted to vice-admiral in December 1930 and placed in command of the Chinkai Guard District, in Korea.

Yonai was given command of the IJN 3rd Fleet in December 1932, following which he again commanded the Sasebo Naval District (November 1933), IJN 2nd Fleet (November 1934) and Yokosuka Naval District (December 1935) before receiving appointment as Commander-in-Chief of the Combined Fleet and concurrently the IJN 1st Fleet in December 1936. While in command at Sasebo, the Japanese Navy was shaken by the Tomozuru Incident, when it was determined that the basic design of the Chidori-class torpedo boats was flawed, thus calling into question the basic designs of many of the warships in the Japanese navy.

While in command at Yokosuka, the February 26 Incident erupted in Tokyo. Yonai was visiting his mistress in Shinbashi the night the attempted coup d'état began, only a couple of blocks away, but knew nothing of the situation until he returned to base the following morning.

== Naval Minister ==
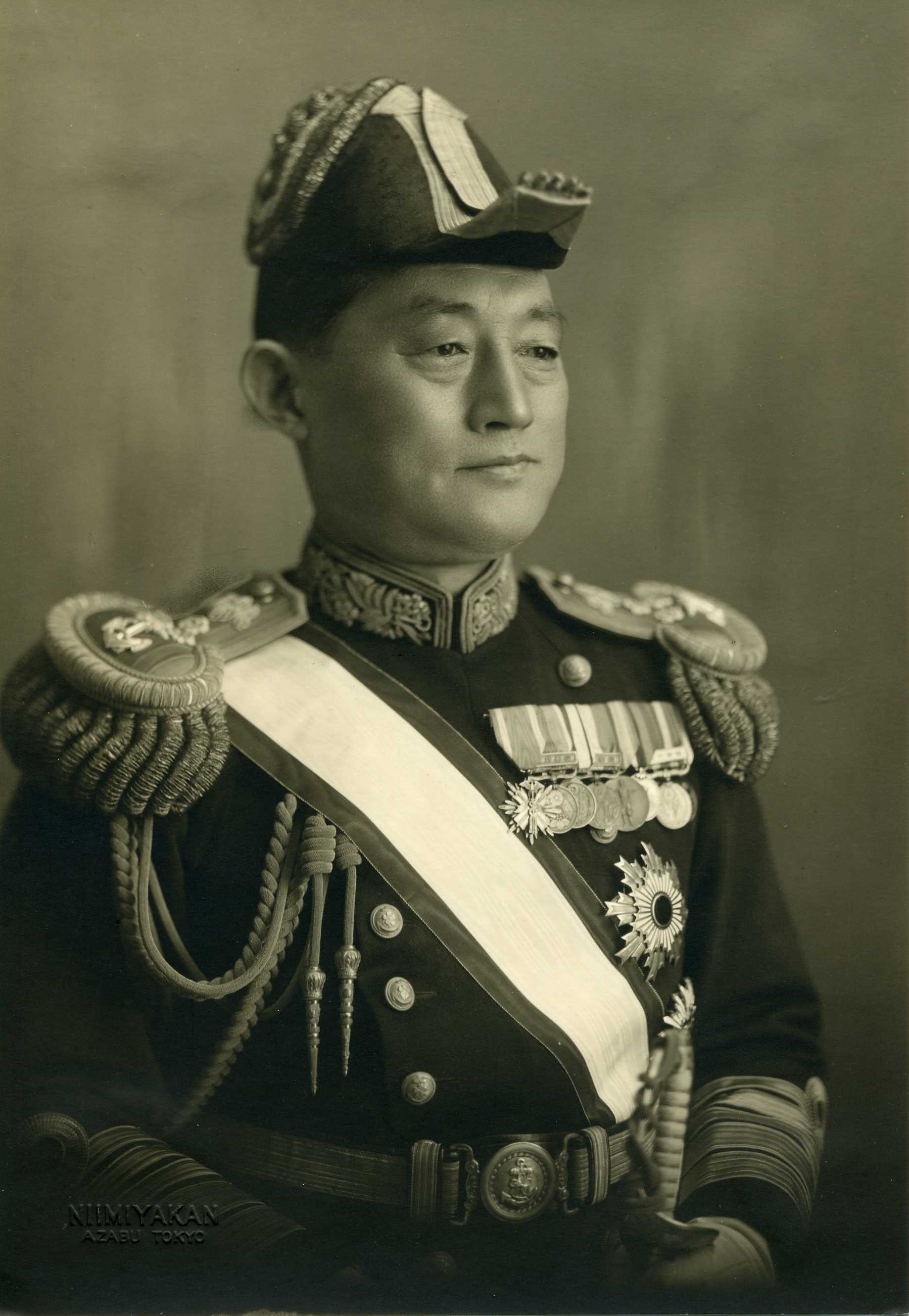
Admiral Yonai, 1937

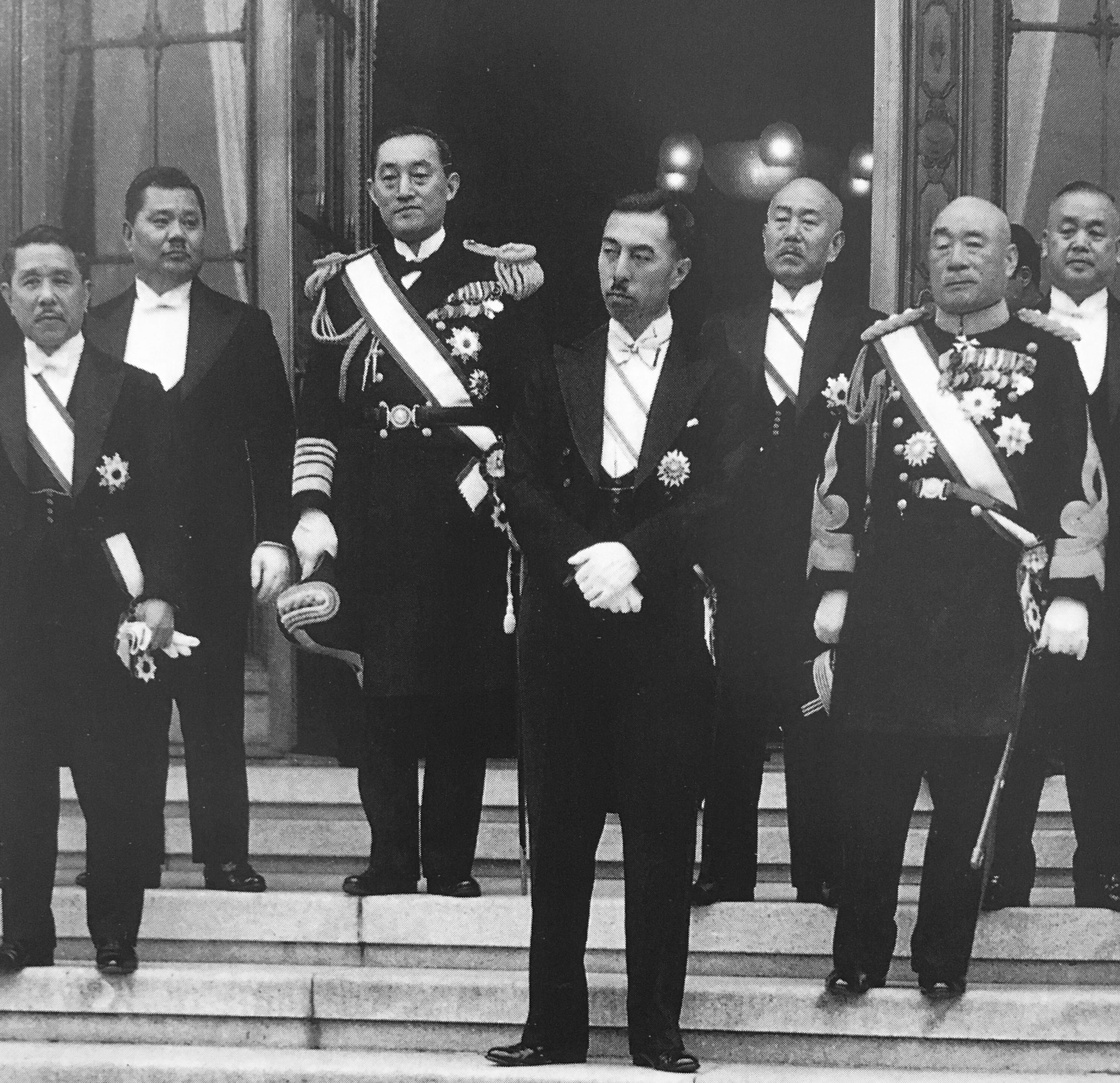
Yonai as Naval Minister with Prime Minister Fumimaro Konoe (First Konoe Cabinet), 1937

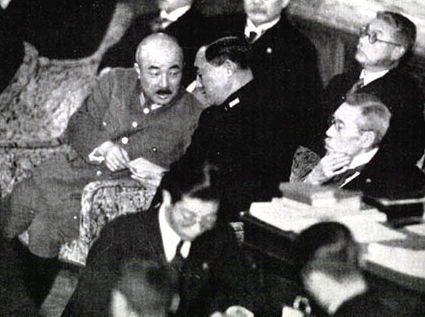
Yonai talking with Minister of War Seishirō Itagaki of Hiranuma Cabinet (Prime Minister Hiranuma Kiichirō), Budget Session of the House of Representatives in 1939

Yonai became full admiral in April 1937 and Navy Minister in the cabinet of Prime Minister Senjūrō Hayashi in 1937. He served in the same position under the subsequent first Fumimaro Konoe and Kiichirō Hiranuma administrations, through August 1939. After Nobuyuki Abe became Prime Minister, Yonai remained on the Supreme War Council. While Navy Minister, Yonai was known as a man of few words. His speeches tended to be short, and were delivered in his almost indecipherable Nambu accent. Written records of his speeches are only about half the length of his contemporaries.

As Navy Minister, Yonai was alarmed by the growing tension between Japan and Great Britain and the United States, at a time when the bulk of the Imperial Japanese Army was tied down in an apparently unending quagmire in China. His efforts to promote peace made him unpopular with ultranationalist extremists, and (as with Admiral Isoroku Yamamoto) he was the target of several assassination attempts. However, Yonai supported the construction of the Yamato-class battleships in an effort to maintain a military balance with the world's other two naval superpowers.

== Premiership (1940) ==
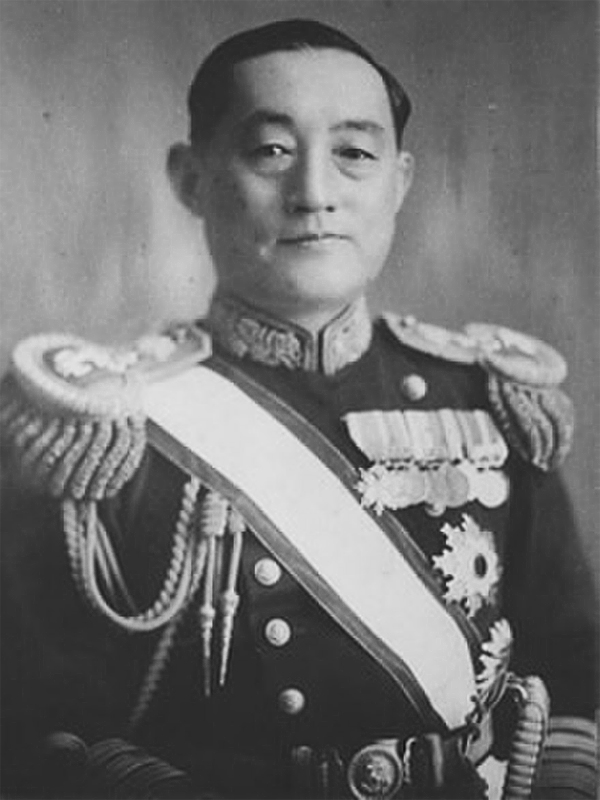
- Premiership of Mitsumasa Yonai; 16 January 1940 – 22 July 1940
- Monarch: Emperor Shōwa
- Cabinet: Yonai Cabinet
- Party: Military (Navy)
- Seat: Naikaku Sōri Daijin Kantei
- Emblem of the Government of Japan

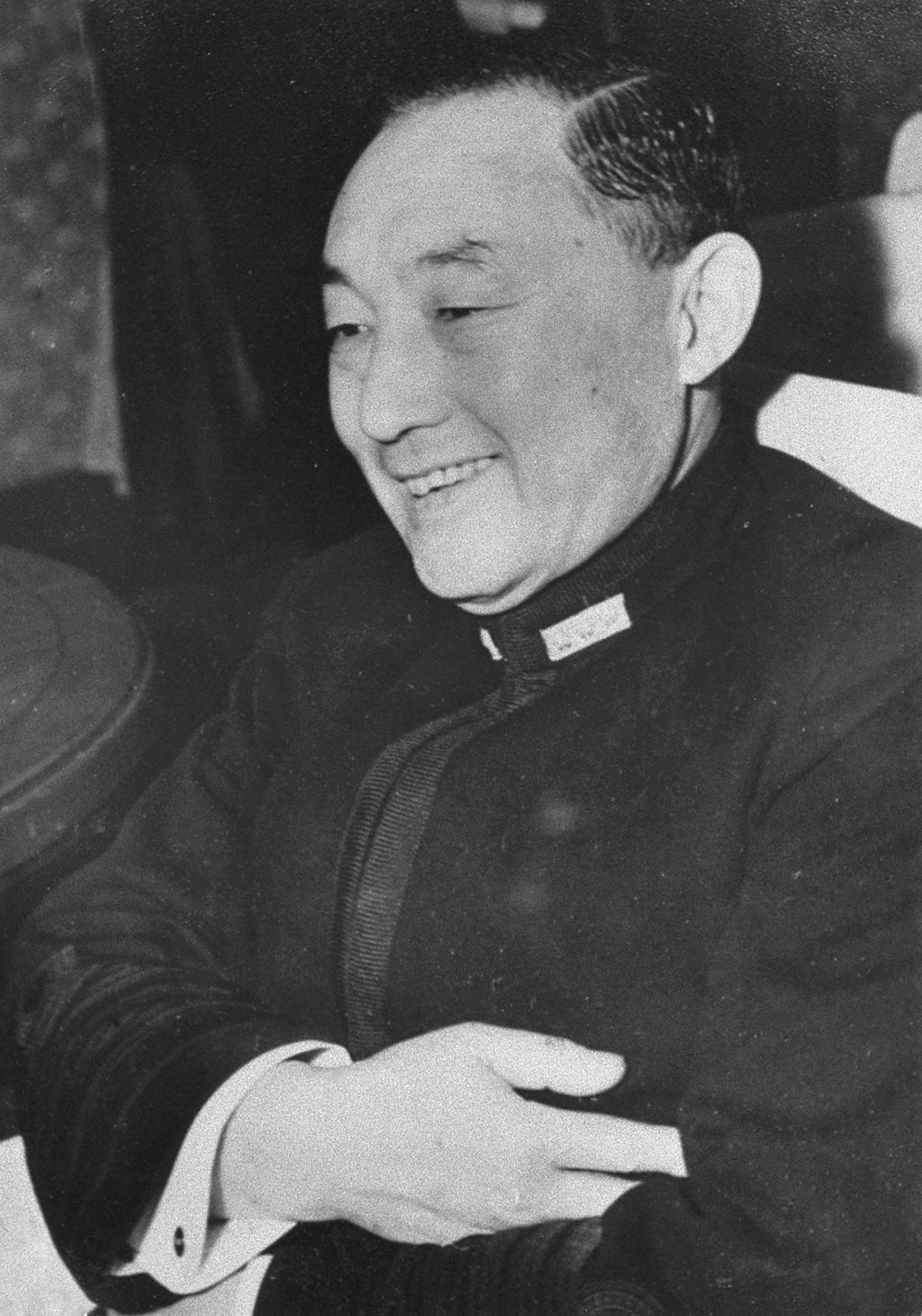
Yonai after Imperial Investiture, January 1940

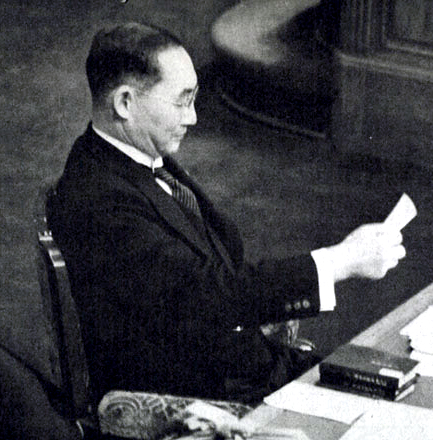
Yonai reading a memo during the lower house plenary session in February 1940.

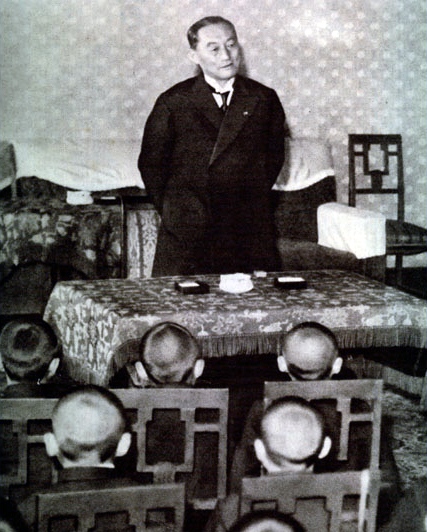
Yonai invites and encourages his hometown, Iwate Prefecture's children who lost their fathers in the Second Sino-Japanese War, Prime Minister's Official Residence in March 1940

Yonai was appointed the Prime Minister of Japan and formed his cabinet from January 6, 1940, largely with the backing of Emperor Hirohito. As the Prime Minister, he continued the strong pro-British, pro-American stance he held as Navy Minister and continued his strong opposition to the Tripartite Pact with Nazi Germany and Fascist Italy.

Following the German occupation of the Low Countries and France in May–June 1940, the Imperial Japanese Army began to show dissatisfaction with Yonai's anti-German and anti-Italian policy. The disagreement became apparent in early July 1940, as Army Minister Shunroku Hata began to criticize the Prime Minister openly. When Hata resigned, Yonai was subsequently forced to resign on July 21, 1940. The Japanese Constitution required the Army Minister to be an active-duty general and no other general would accept the position, due to the pro-Axis stance of the Imperial Japanese Army. The Tripartite Pact was signed on September 27, 1940.

== Subsequent political activity ==
Yonai served as the Deputy Prime Minister and concurrently as the Navy Minister again under the cabinet of Prime Minister Kuniaki Koiso from July 22, 1944, during which time he returned to the active duty roster from the reserve list. By this time, Saipan had fallen to the Allies.

Yonai remained Navy Minister under the administration of Prime Minister Kantarō Suzuki. In the last few weeks before Japan's surrender, he sided with Prime Minister Suzuki and Foreign Minister Shigenori Tōgō in support of acceptance of the Potsdam Declaration and surrender of Japan in opposition to Army Minister Korechika Anami, Chief of Naval General Staff Admiral Soemu Toyoda and Chief of the Army General Staff General Yoshijirō Umezu.

Yonai remained Navy Minister in the cabinet of Prime Minister Prince Naruhiko Higashikuni and cabinet of Prime Minister Kijūrō Shidehara from August 1945, during which time he presided over the final dissolution of the Imperial Japanese Navy.

He played a major role during the International Military Tribunal for the Far East in working with the major defendants, such as former Prime Minister Hideki Tōjō, to coordinate their testimonies so that Emperor Hirohito would be spared from indictment. According to his interpreter Suichi Mizota, in March 1946 Bonner Fellers asked him to make Tōjō bear all responsibility for the Greater East Asia War.

Yonai suffered from high blood pressure most of his life, but died of pneumonia on 20 April 1948 at the age of 68. His grave is located at the temple of Enko-ji in his hometown of Morioka.

== Assessment ==
=== Minister of the Imperial Japanese Navy (1937–1939) ===
Because of Yonai’s work as a military attaché in Russia and Poland and his travels around European countries, he had a broader perspective of world affairs than many other senior Japanese military officials. In the late 1930s Yonai already analyzed the naval capabilities of the Imperial Japanese Navy and Allied countries, versus those of Germany and Italy and he concluded that Japan should not ally itself with the Axis powers. In addition to his experience as an attaché, he had participated in the Battle of the Japan Sea (known in the West as the Battle of Tsushima) during the Russo-Japanese War as a lieutenant, so he understood the realities of naval warfare. Hence, on August 8, 1939, at the five-ministry commission that was intended to make a plan for war, the Minister of Finance, Ishiwata, asked Yonai, "Is it possible for the Imperial Japanese Navy to triumph over America and Britain?" (Agawa, n.d.). Yonai answered, "No. The Imperial Japanese Navy is not designed to open fire against them. The Third Reich and the Italian Navy are out of question." (Agawa, n.d.).

After the historical triumph of the Battle of the Japan Sea in 1905 during the Russo-Japanese War, the Imperial Japanese Navy was the world's third strongest. By the end of World War I, Japan had a powerful battle fleet. In the 1930s, following the Washington Naval Treaty, Japan built a strong naval aviation arm with excellent aircraft and pilots. Even so, the Imperial Japanese Navy could not compete against the Royal Navy and the United States Navy, the top two navies in the world. Consequently, the much smaller Kriegsmarine (German Navy) and the Regia Marina (Italian Navy) could not defeat these two dominants. Furthermore, the Imperial Japanese Navy had been made overconfident by its victory and was not willing to acknowledge a position of inferiority. However, his unique experiences made him convinced of his view. Therefore, Yonai clearly announced his opinion: the Imperial Japanese Navy would lose if it attacked the Royal Navy and the United States Navy.

=== Pre-premiership ===
Before he was chosen as the Prime Minister, Yonai showed strong leadership particularly in crisis. On February 26, 1936, there was an attempted coup d'état led by young officers of the Imperial Japanese Army. The generals of the Imperial Japanese Army struggled to decide the appellation of the rebel troops, whom the generals were hesitant to refer to as rebels because it was extremely shameful for them to admit internecine strife. Hence, the generals were hesitant. On the other hand, Yonai, the commander-in-chief of the Sasebo Naval District, instantaneously labeled them as "Insurrectional troops", (Agawa, n.d.) and let the chief of his staff, Admiral Inoue Shigeyoshi, publish his position to all the Sasebo Naval District. Because of this immediate announcement, navy officers in the Sasebo Naval District were compelled to stop participating with the rebellion troops. Yonai's prompt action as the supreme commander tranquilized the Sasebo Naval District.

=== Premiership (16 January to 22 July 1940) ===
Despite not being famous, Yonai made significant decisions that depict his strong moral character. At his appointment as Prime Minister, he retired from active service without being asked to do so. He intended not to control his cabinet ministers by naval influences. This verdict was momentous, as once a general or admiral retires, he loses influence, hence all the generals and admirals are reluctant to retire. Indeed, even Tojo Hideki, the 40th Prime Minister did not retire at his promotion to Prime Minister, but persisted in active service in the Imperial Japanese Army in order to uphold his control over it. Because of Yonai's retirement from the Imperial Japanese Navy, the Yonai Cabinet was cooperative. One prominent evidence of this was that: nevertheless his cabinet had continued just a half a year, his cabinet members and followers formed a friendly reunion right after his resignation in 1937, and it still lasting in the Heisei period (1989–2019). This reunion was named Ichi-Roku Kai, which means sixteenth gathering, because Yonai's appointment and resignation as a Prime Minister both happened on the 16th day of their months.

=== Emperor's trust ===
Emperor Shōwa (Hirohito) trusted Yonai's strong moral character. By July 1944, the situation of World War II was apparently against Japan. As for this difficult circumstance, the Imperial Japanese Navy was in a confusion. Supreme commanders of the Imperial Japanese Navy decided to appoint Yonai as the Minister of Navy because he had popularity and charisma enough to unite the Imperial Japanese Navy, although Yonai had already retired. To assign Yonai as the Minister of Navy, the Emperor's consent was necessary. Meanwhile, Admiral Suetsugu was also a candidate. The Emperor selected Yonai because Suetsugu was famous for his ambition, and allowed Yonai to be the Minister of Navy even though he was no longer in active service. This appointment demonstrated Shōwa's trust in Yonai because he is the only one person in the Imperial Japanese Navy's history to return from retirement and be posted to the supreme position as the Minister of Navy. After the Imperial Japanese Navy was defeated, the Emperor called Yonai to the palace. The Emperor amiably invited Yonai to have lunch together. After that, the Emperor said, "I really appreciated your duty and effort not to begin the war. I think we are not going to meet often like before". He put a pen and inkstone into a case and said, "These are the things that I have used. I would like to present this as a gift to you." This action is extremely rare because having presented the belongings of the Emperor is the supreme honor and the utmost expression of amiability.

== Decorations ==
- 1906 – Order of the Rising Sun, 5th class
- 1906 – Order of the Golden Kite, 5th class
- 1912 – Order of the Sacred Treasure, 4th class
- 1915 – Order of the Rising Sun, 4th class
- 1918 – Order of the Sacred Treasure, 3rd class
- 1920 – Order of the Rising Sun, 3rd class
- 1920 – Order of the Golden Kite, 4th class
- 1927 - Order of the Sacred Treasure, 2nd class
- 1933 – Grand Cordon of the Order of the Sacred Treasure
- 1934 – Grand Cordon of the Order of the Rising Sun
- 1943 – Order of the Golden Kite, 1st class

== In popular culture ==
- In the 2011 film Isoroku, Yonai was portrayed by actor Akira Emoto
- In the 2015 film The Emperor in August, Yonai was portrayed by actor Ikuji Nakamura

== Notes ==
Military offices
Preceded by Shima Yukichi	2nd Fleet; Chief-of-staff; 1 December 1925 – 1 December 1926	Succeeded by Matsuyama Shigeru
Preceded by Sakonji Seizō	3rd Fleet; Commander-in-chief; 1 December 1932 - 15 September 1933	Succeeded by Imamura Shinjirō
Preceded by Sakonji Seizō	Sasebo Naval District; Commander-in-chief; 15 November 1933 - 15 November 1934	Succeeded by Imamura Nobujirō
Preceded by Takahashi Sankichi	2nd Fleet; Commander-in-chief; 15 November 1934 – 2 December 1935	Succeeded by Katō Takayoshi
Preceded by Suetsugu Nobumasa	Yokosuka Naval District; Commander-in-chief; 2 December 1935 - 1 December 1936	Succeeded by Hyakutake Gengo
Preceded by Takahashi Sankichi	Combined Fleet & 1st Fleet; Commander-in-chief; 1 December 1936 – 2 February 1937	Succeeded by Nagano Osami
Political offices
Preceded by Nagano Osami	Minister of the Navy; 2 February 1937 – 30 August 1939	Succeeded by Yoshida Zengo
Preceded by Nobuyuki Abe	Prime Minister; 16 January 1940 – 22 July 1940	Succeeded by Fumimaro Konoe
Preceded by Nomura Naokuni	Minister of the Navy; 22 July 1944 – 1 December 1945	Position abolished
