= Tōjō cabinet =

Cabinet of Japan (1941–1944)

Tōjō Cabinet
- 40th Cabinet of Japan

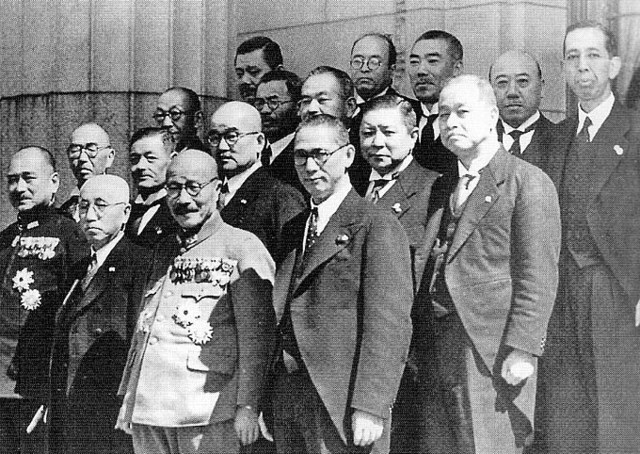
- Tōjō Cabinet in October 18th, 1941
- Date formed: October 18, 1941
- Date dissolved: July 22, 1944

People and organisations
- Emperor: Shōwa
- Prime Minister: Hideki Tōjō
- Member party: Imperial Rule Assistance Association (Taisei Yokusankai); Independent; Military
- Status in legislature: One-party government

History
- Election: 1942 Japanese general election
- Legislature term: 77th-84th Imperial Diet
- Predecessor: Third Konoe Cabinet
- Successor: Koiso Cabinet

The Tōjō Cabinet is the 40th Cabinet of Japan led by Hideki Tojo from 18 October 1941 to 22 July 1944.

== Cabinet ==
Ministers
Portfolio	Name	Political party	Term start	Term end
Prime Minister	Hideki Tojo	Taisei Yokusankai	October 18, 1941	July 22, 1944
Minister for Foreign Affairs	Shigenori Tōgō	Independent	October 18, 1941	September 1, 1942
Minister for Foreign Affairs	Hideki Tojo	Taisei Yokusankai	September 1, 1942	September 17, 1942
Minister for Foreign Affairs	Masayuki Tani	Independent	September 17, 1942	April 20, 1943
Minister for Foreign Affairs	Mamoru Shigemitsu	Independent	April 20, 1943	July 22, 1944
Minister of Home Affairs	Hideki Tojo	Taisei Yokusankai	October 18, 1941	February 17, 1942
Minister of Home Affairs	Michio Yuzawa	Independent	February 17, 1942	April 20, 1943
Minister of Home Affairs	Kisaburō Andō	Military (Army)	April 20, 1943	July 22, 1944
Minister of Finance	Okinori Kaya	Independent	October 18, 1941	February 19, 1944
Minister of the Army	Hideki Tojo	Taisei Yokusankai	October 18, 1941	July 22, 1944
Minister of the Navy	Shigetarō Shimada	Military (Navy)	October 18, 1941	July 17, 1944
Minister of Justice	Michiyo Iwamura	Independent	October 18, 1941	July 17, 1944
Minister of Education	Kunihiko Hashida	Independent	October 18, 1941	April 20, 1943
Minister of Education	Hideki Tojo	Taisei Yokusankai	April 20, 1943	April 23, 1943
Minister of Education	Nagakage Okabe	Independent	April 23, 1943	July 22, 1944
Minister of Agriculture, Forestry and Fisheries	Hiroya Ino	Independent	October 18, 1941	April 20, 1943
Minister of Agriculture, Forestry and Fisheries	Tatsunosuke Yamazaki	Taisei Yokusankai	April 20, 1943	November 1, 1943
Minister of Commerce and Industry	Nobusuke Kishi	Independent	October 18, 1941	October 8, 1943
Minister of Commerce and Industry	Hideki Tojo	Taisei Yokusankai	October 8, 1943	November 1, 1943
Minister of Communications	Ken Terajima	Military (Navy)	October 18, 1941	October 8, 1943
Minister of Communications	Yoshiaki Hatta	Independent	October 8, 1943	November 1, 1943
Minister of Railways	Ken Terajima	Military (Navy)	October 18, 1941	December 2, 1941
Minister of Railways	Yoshiaki Hatta	Independent	December 2, 1941	November 1, 1943
Minister of Colonial Affairs	Shigenori Tōgō	Independent	October 18, 1941	December 2, 1941
Minister of Colonial Affairs	Hiroya Ino	Independent	December 2, 1941	November 1, 1942
Minister of Health	Chikahiko Koizumi	Military (Navy)	October 18, 1941	July 22, 1944
Minister of State	Teiichi Suzuki	Independent	October 18, 1941	October 8, 1943
Minister of State	Kisaburō Andō	Military (Army)	June 9, 1942	April 20, 1943
Minister of State	Kazuo Aoki	Independent	September 17, 1942	November 1, 1942
Minister of State	Tadao Ōasa	Taisei Yokusankai	April 20, 1943	July 22, 1944
Minister of State	Fumio Gotō	Independent	May 26, 1943	July 22, 1944
Minister of State	Nobusuke Kishi	Independent	October 8, 1943	July 22, 1944
Chief Cabinet Secretary	Naoki Hoshino	Independent	October 18, 1941	July 22, 1944
Director-General of the Cabinet Legislation Bureau	Eiichi Moriyama	Independent	October 18, 1941	July 22, 1944

== Reorganized Cabinet ==
The Cabinet was reorganized on November 1, 1943.

Ministers
Portfolio	Name	Political party	Term start	Term end
Prime Minister	Hideki Tojo	Taisei Yokusankai	October 18, 1941	July 22, 1944
Minister for Foreign Affairs	Mamoru Shigemitsu	Independent	April 20, 1943	July 22, 1944
Minister of Home Affairs	Kisaburō Andō	Military (Army)	April 20, 1943	July 22, 1944
Minister of Finance	Okinori Kaya	Independent	October 18, 1941	February 19, 1944
Minister of Finance	Sōtarō Ishiwata	Independent	February 19, 1944	July 22, 1944
Minister of the Army	Hideki Tojo	Taisei Yokusankai	October 18, 1941	July 22, 1944
Minister of the Navy	Shigetarō Shimada	Military (Navy)	October 18, 1941	July 17, 1944
Minister of the Navy	Naokuni Nomura	Military (Navy)	July 17, 1944	July 22, 1944
Minister of Justice	Michiyo Iwamura	Independent	October 18, 1941	July 17, 1944
Minister of Education	Nagakage Okabe	Independent	April 23, 1943	July 22, 1944
Minister of Agriculture and Commerce	Tatsunosuke Yamazaki	Taisei Yokusankai	November 1, 1943	February 19, 1944
Minister of Agriculture and Commerce	Nobuya Uchida	Taisei Yokusankai	February 19, 1944	July 22, 1944
Minister of Munitions	Hideki Tojo	Taisei Yokusankai	November 1, 1943	July 22, 1944
Ministry of Transport and Communications	Yoshiaki Hatta	Independent	November 1, 1943	February 19, 1944
Ministry of Transport and Communications	Keita Gotō	Independent	February 19, 1944	July 22, 1944
Minister of Greater East Asia	Kazuo Aoki	Independent	November 1, 1943	July 22, 1944
Minister of Health	Chikahiko Koizumi	Military (Navy)	October 18, 1941	July 22, 1944
Minister of State	Tadao Ōasa	Taisei Yokusankai	April 20, 1943	July 22, 1944
Minister of State	Fumio Gotō	Independent	May 26, 1943	July 22, 1944
Minister of State	Nobusuke Kishi	Independent	October 8, 1943	July 22, 1944
Minister of State	Ginjirō Fujiwara	Independent	November 17, 1943	July 22, 1944
Chief Cabinet Secretary	Naoki Hoshino	Independent	October 18, 1941	July 22, 1944
Director-General of the Cabinet Legislation Bureau	Eiichi Moriyama	Independent	October 18, 1941	July 22, 1944
