= Yonezō Maeda =

Japanese politician (d. 1954)

- 前田 米蔵
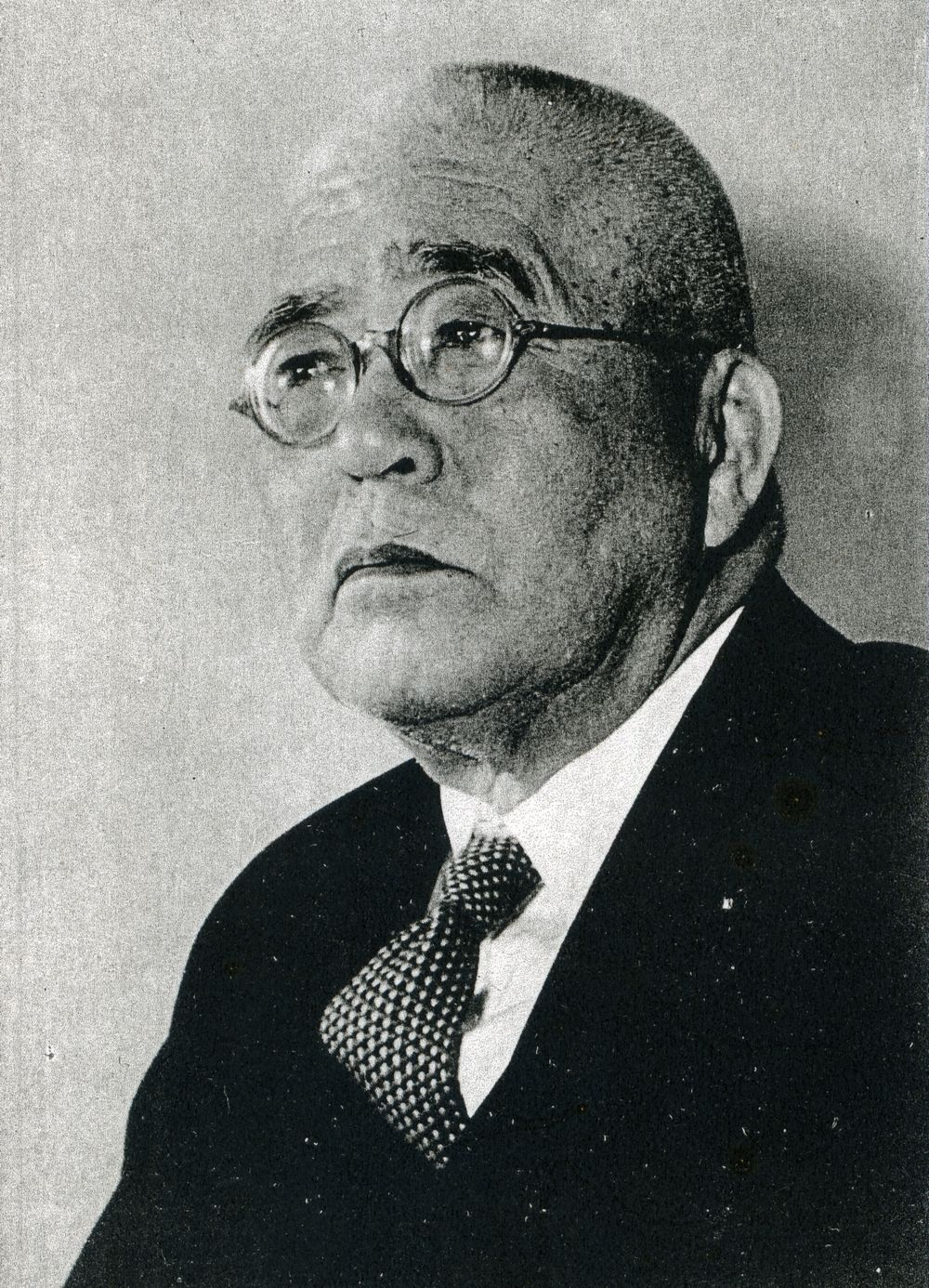

Minister of Transport and Communications
- In office 22 July 1944 – 7 April 1945
- Prime Minister: Kuniaki Koiso
- Preceded by: Keita Gotō
- Succeeded by: Teijirō Toyoda

Minister of Railways
- In office 5 January 1939 – 30 August 1939
- Prime Minister: Hiranuma Kiichirō
- Preceded by: Chikuhei Nakajima
- Succeeded by: Ryūtarō Nagai
- In office 9 March 1936 – 2 February 1937
- Prime Minister: Kōki Hirota
- Preceded by: Nobuya Uchida
- Succeeded by: Takuo Godō

Minister of Commerce and Industry
- In office 13 December 1931 – 26 May 1932
- Prime Minister: Inukai Tsuyoshi
- Preceded by: Yukio Sakurauchi
- Succeeded by: Kumakichi Nakajima

Director-General of the Legislative Bureau
- In office 20 April 1927 – 3 July 1929
- Prime Minister: Tanaka Giichi
- Preceded by: Tadao Yamakawa
- Succeeded by: Kawasaki Takukichi

Member of the House of Representatives
- In office 2 October 1952 – 14 March 1953
- Preceded by: Senpachi Suzuki
- Succeeded by: Senpachi Suzuki
- Constituency: Tokyo 5th
- In office 21 April 1917 – 18 December 1945
- Preceded by: Sakuzō Morikubo
- Succeeded by: Constituency abolished
- Constituency: Tokyo Counties (1917–1920); Tokyo 14th (1920–1928); Tokyo 6th (1928–1945)

Personal details
- Born: 17 February 1882 Wakayama Prefecture, Japan
- Died: 18 March 1954 (aged 72) Minato, Tokyo, Japan
- Party: Rikken Seiyūkai (1917–1940)
- Other political affiliations: IRAA (1940–1945); JPP (1945–1946); LP (1952–1953)
- Education: Tokyo Law School

Yonezō Maeda (前田 米蔵, Maeda Yonezō; 17 February 1882 – 18 March 1954) was a politician and cabinet minister in the pre-war Empire of Japan.

== Biography ==
Maeda was a native of Wakayama Prefecture, and a graduate of the Tokyo Hōgakuin (the predecessor to the law school of Chuo University). He received his law degree in 1903. He was elected to the Lower House of the Diet of Japan in the 1917 General Election, under the Rikken Seiyūkai banner, and was subsequently reelected to the same seat during the next nine elections. Maeda served as Secretary-General of the party in 1925. In 1927, Prime Minister Tanaka Giichi picked Maeda as his Director-General of the Cabinet Legislation Bureau. Maeda subsequent was appointed Minister of Commerce and Industry under the Inukai Cabinet in 1931. He returned to the Cabinet under the Hirota Cabinet as Railway Minister in 1936. In 1939, Maeda was asked to resume his post as Railway Minister under the Hiranuma Cabinet.

As with all other Japanese politicians, Maeda was forced to join the Taisei Yokusankai created by Prime Minister Fumimaro Konoe in 1940, and served as the party's Chairman for Administrative Affairs. During World War II, Maeda served as Minister of Transport and Communications, under the Koiso Cabinet. After the surrender of Japan, Maeda joined the Japan Progressive Party, which had emerged under the occupation of Japan. However, he was purged from public office in 1946 along with all other members of the wartime administration. In 1952, with the end of the occupation of Japan, he became one of the founding members of the Liberal Party headed by Shigeru Yoshida, forming his own faction within the party. However, he was defeated in the 1953 General Election, and went into retirement. Maeda died the following year.

Political offices
| Preceded by Keita Gotō | Minister of Transport and Communications; Jul 1944 – Apr 1945 | Succeeded by Teijirō Toyoda |
| Preceded by Chikuhei Nakajima | Minister of Railway; Jan 1939 – Aug 1939 | Succeeded by Ryūtarō Nagai |
| Preceded by Nobuya Uchida | Minister of Railway; Mar 1936 – Feb 1937 | Succeeded by Takuo Godō |
| Preceded by Yukio Sakurauchi | Minister of Commerce and Industry; Dec 1931 – May 1932 | Succeeded by Kumakichi Nakajima |
