= Yoshiaki Hatta =

Japanese politician

- 八田 嘉明
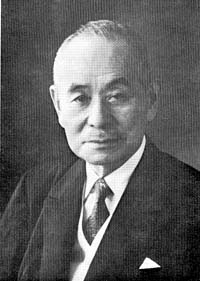
- Hatta in the 1950s

Minister of Transport and Communications
- In office 1 November 1943 – 19 February 1944
- Prime Minister: Hideki Tojo
- Preceded by: Office established
- Succeeded by: Keita Gotō

Minister of Communications
- In office 8 October 1943 – 1 November 1943
- Prime Minister: Hideki Tojo
- Preceded by: Ken Terajima
- Succeeded by: Sasayoshi Hitotsumatsu (1946)

Minister of Railways
- In office 2 December 1941 – 1 November 1943
- Prime Minister: Hideki Tojo
- Preceded by: Ken Terajima
- Succeeded by: Office abolished

Minister of Commerce and Industry
- In office 5 January 1939 – 30 August 1939
- Prime Minister: Hiranuma Kiichirō
- Preceded by: Ikeda Shigeaki
- Succeeded by: Takuo Godō

Minister of Colonial Affairs
- In office 29 October 1938 – 5 January 1939
- Prime Minister: Fumimaro Konoe
- Preceded by: Fumimaro Konoe
- Succeeded by: Kuniaki Koiso

Member of the House of Peers
- In office 1 July 1929 – 8 February 1946 Nominated by the Emperor

Personal details
- Born: 14 September 1879 Tokyo, Japan
- Died: 26 April 1964 (aged 84)
- Party: Independent
- Education: Tokyo Imperial University

Yoshiaki Hatta (八田 嘉明, Hatta Yoshiaki; 14 September 1879 – 26 April 1964), was an engineer, entrepreneur, politician and cabinet minister in the Empire of Japan, serving as a member of the Upper House of the Diet of Japan, and five times as a cabinet minister.

== Biography ==
Hatta was born in Tokyo, and was a graduate from Tokyo Imperial University with a degree in civil engineering. He was employed by the San'yō Railway from 1903. However, he was recruited into the government bureaucracy, and transferred a position within the Railroad Bureau of the Ministry of Communications in 1906. After the Railway Ministry was created, Hatta was appointed a Director in 1926. He was further awarded with a seat in the House of Peers from 1929.

With the creation of the South Manchurian Railway Company (SMR), Hatta was appointed Vice President in 1932. He reorganized the management of the SMR, favoring increased cooperation with the Kwantung Army after the Manchurian Incident. He also encouraged French investment in the construction of the new capital of Manchukuo, Shinkyo

In 1934, under the Hiranuma Cabinet, Hatta was asked to serve as both Minister of Commerce and as Minister of Colonial Affairs. He was also made head of the Japan Chamber of Commerce and Industry and the Tokyo Chamber of Commerce and Industry.

In 1941, many small private railway companies were merged under government pressure into the Tobu Railway, as per the syndicalist economic policies of the Taisei Yokusankai. Hatta was appointed Chairman of the Board of the expanded company. In 1943, he was asked to serve concurrently as Minister of Communications and Railroad Minister, this time under the Tōjō Cabinet. During this administration, the two cabinet-level posts were merged into the new Ministry of Transport and Communications in 1943, and Hatta became the first head of the combined ministry. In 1945, Hatta became president of the North China Development Company, a subsidiary of the South Manchurian Railway dedicated to the economic development of the areas of northern China under occupation by Japan.

Following the surrender of Japan and the end of World War II, Hatta was purged from public office by the Supreme Commander of the Allied Powers. In 1953, he became president of Takushoku University, a post which he held to September 1954. In 1955, he became president of Nippei Kōsan Corporation, and Chairman of the Japan Science Foundation. In 1956, he founded the Nippon Gijustu Kyōwa Kaihatsu Corporation, and in 1957 he was named chairman of the forerunner to the Japan Highway Public Corporation. Hatta died in 1964.

== Notes ==
Political offices
Preceded by Fumimaro Konoe	Minister of Colonial Affairs; October 1938–April 1939	Succeeded by Kuniaki Koiso
Preceded by Shigeaki Ikeda	Minister of Commerce and Industry; January 1939–August 1939	Succeeded by Takuo Godō
Preceded by Ken Terajima	Minister of Railways; December 1941–November 1943	Succeeded by Himself as Minister of Transport and Communications
Preceded by Ken Terajima	Minister of Communications; October 1943–November 1943	Succeeded by Himself as Minister of Transport and Communications
Preceded by Himself as Minister of Railways and Minister of Communications	Minister of Transport and Communications; November 1943–February 1944	Succeeded by Keita Gotō
Business positions
Preceded by Takuo Godō	Head of the Japan Chamber of Commerce and Industry; October 1938–August 1939	Succeeded by Aiichiro Fujiyama
Academic offices
Preceded by Norihisa Suzuki	Chancellor of Takushoku University; 1953–1954	Succeeded by Teiji Yabe
Other offices
Preceded by Kenzō Tatsuma	President of the Japan Society of Civil Engineers; 1939–1940	Succeeded by Kenichi Nakamura
