= Keita Goto =

Keita Goto may be:

- Keita Goto (footballer), Japanese football player
- Keita Gotō (industrialist), Japanese industrialist and founder of the Tokyu Group
