= Sakurauchi =

Sakurauchi (written: 櫻内) is a Japanese surname. Notable people with the surname include:

- Nagisa Sakurauchi (櫻内 渚, born 1989), Japanese footballer
- Yoshio Sakurauchi (櫻内 義雄, 1912–2003), Japanese politician
- Yukio Sakurauchi (櫻内 幸雄, 1888–1947), Japanese politician

== Fictional characters ==
- Riko Sakurauchi (桜内 梨子), a character from the media-mix project Love Live! Sunshine!!
