= Ginjirō Fujiwara =

Japanese politician

- 藤原 銀次郎
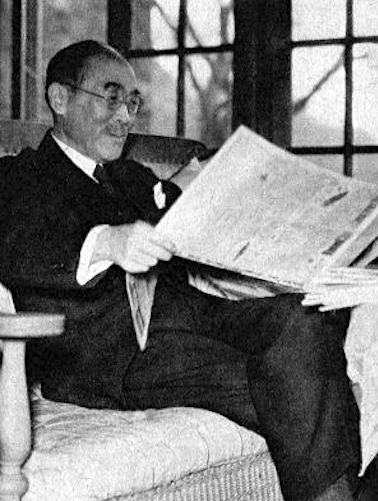
- Fujiwara in 1940

Minister of Munitions
- In office 22 July 1944 – 19 December 1944
- Prime Minister: Kuniaki Koiso
- Preceded by: Hideki Tojo
- Succeeded by: Shigeru Yoshida

Minister of Commerce and Industry
- In office 16 January 1940 – 22 July 1940
- Prime Minister: Mitsumasa Yonai
- Preceded by: Takuo Godō
- Succeeded by: Ichizō Kobayashi

Member of the House of Peers
- In office 19 February 1929 – 1 April 1946 Nominated by the Emperor

Personal details
- Born: 25 July 1869 Kamiminochi, Nagano, Japan
- Died: 17 March 1960 (aged 90)
- Resting place: Tsukiji Hongan-ji
- Party: Independent
- Education: Keio University

Ginjirō Fujiwara (藤原 銀次郎, Fujiwara Ginjirō; 25 July 1869 – 17 March 1960), was an industrialist and politician in the Empire of Japan, serving as a member of the Upper House of the Diet of Japan, advisor to Prime Minister Hideki Tojo, and twice as a cabinet minister. Prior to his political career, he was a central figure in the pre-war Mitsui zaibatsu and president of Oji Paper Company.

== Early life ==
Fujiwara was born in Kamiminochi District, Nagano, currently part of Nagano city, where his father, a farmer, was also a trader in indigo and thus the wealthiest man in the village. Fujiwara originally intended to become a medical doctor, and travelled to Tokyo at the age of 16. However, on graduation from a school affiliated with Keio University, he found employment at the Matsui Shimpo newspaper instead, rising to the position of editor-in-chief. When the newspaper was in severe financial difficulties, he also assumed the post of president, but was unable to prevent it from falling into bankruptcy.

In 1895, through the introduction of one of his former classmates, Fujiwara was hired by the Mitsui Bank. One of his close colleagues was Shigeaki Ikeda. He rose rapidly through the ranks, working at the branch office at Otsu, Shiga, and was assistant manager of a branch in Fukagawa, Tokyo. He was then appointed manager of the Tomioka silk mill, which was under Mitsui ownership. Under his management, he resolved labor dispute issues by a combination of wage increases and improved working conditions through negotiations.

Due to his success at the Tomioka Silk Mill, he was called in to assume management of Oji Paper, when its workers went on strike in 1898; however, this time he was not as successful and had to call in workers from Fuji Paper (also owned by Mitsui) to break the strike. In 1899, he was transferred to Mitsui & Co., where he was made vice-manager of the company branch in Shanghai. He remained in Shanghai over ten years, becoming branch manager, and also director of procurement for wood. He returned to Oji Paper as vice-president in 1911, at a time when Oji Paper was in severe financial difficulties. Fujiwara turned the company around by replacing managers suspected of embezzlement, purchasing the latest production equipment from Europe, and suing major debtors who were delinquent on payments.

== Political career ==
In 1929, Fujiwara was appointed to a seat in the Upper House of the Diet of Japan. In 1933, he merged Oji Paper with Fuji Paper and Karafuto Industries, a paper company based in Karafuto to form New Oji Paper, with a market share of over 80%. He resigned his position as president of the new company in 1938 to become chairman of the board. The same year, he established a private university in Yokohama, of the Fujiwara Institute of Technology, to train engineers and managerial talent. The university is now the Faculty of Engineering of Keio University.

In 1940, he was asked to join the cabinet of Mitsumasa Yonai as Minister of Commerce and Industry. In 1942, he was nominated a special advisor to the cabinet of Prime Minister Tōjō, with oversight over naval procurement, and in 1943 joined the Tōjō cabinet as a minister without portfolio. In 1944, under Tōjō’s successor, Kuniaki Koiso, he became Minister of Munitions. With the war situation quickly becoming critical, Fujiwara devoted his efforts to increasing the production of aircraft to defend Japan against the increasing Allied bombing attacks. He was astonished to find that aircraft built at Mitsubishi’s Nagoya works were being transported to the nearest airfields by ox cart.

== Post-political career ==
Following the end of World War II, Fujiwara, along with all other members of the former Japanese government were arrested by the Supreme Commander of the Allied Powers and was held in Sugamo Prison on war crime charges, but his case was dropped soon after.

In 1959, he turned over much of his private fortune to a charitable foundation, the Fujiwara Foundation of Science. The Foundation awards the Fujiwara Prize to scientists who have made important contributions to the advancement of science and technology.

Fujiwara died of a stroke in 1960. He was posthumously awarded the Order of the Rising Sun, 1st class.

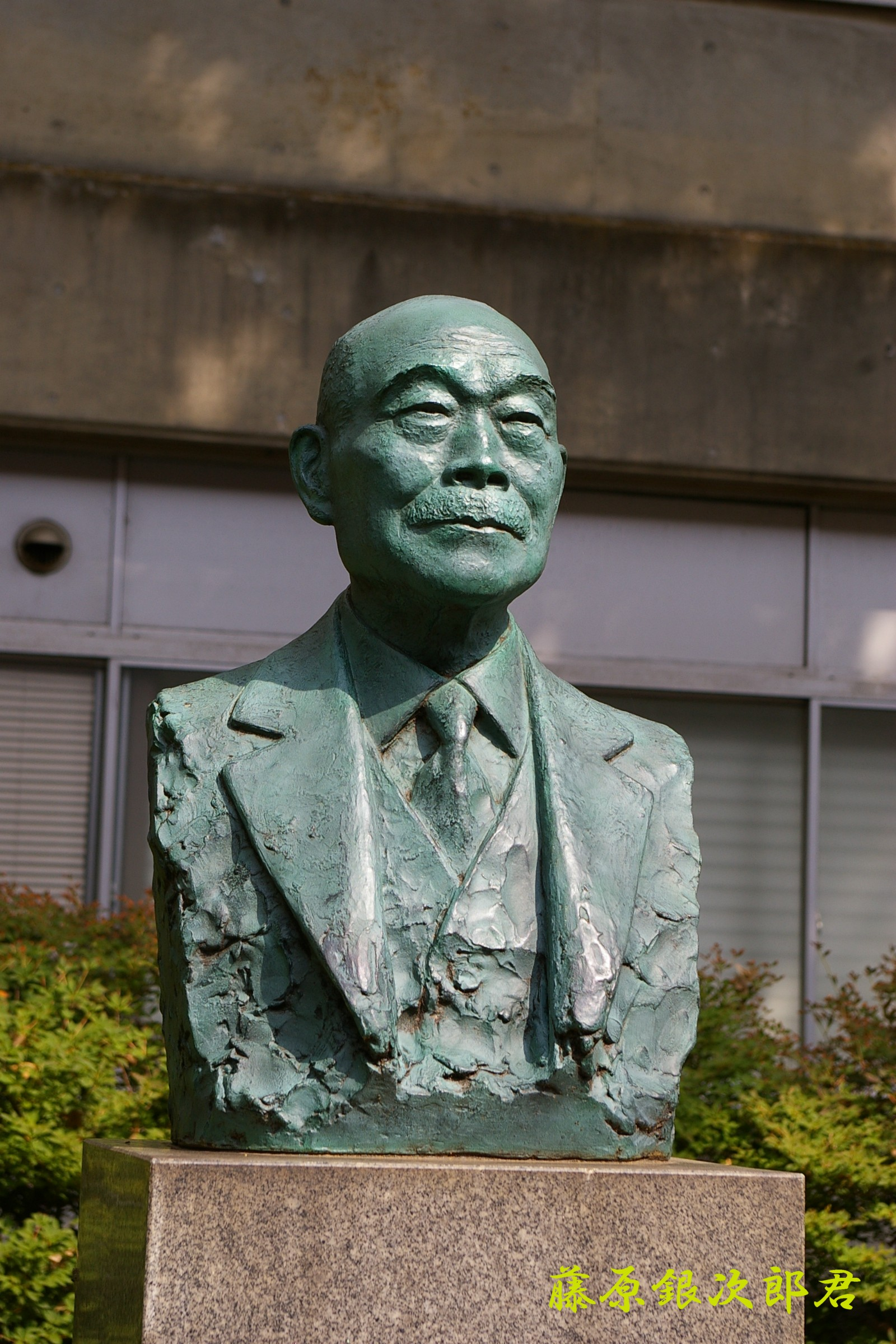
The bust of Ginjiro Hujiwara in Keio University Yagami campus

Political offices
Preceded by Hideki Tōjō	Minister of Munitions; Jul 1944 – Dec 1944	Succeeded by Shigeru Yoshida
Preceded by Takuo Godō	Minister of Commerce and Industry; Jan 1940 – Jul 1940	Succeeded by Ichizō Kobayashi
