= Chikuhei Nakajima =

Japanese politician

- 中島 知久平
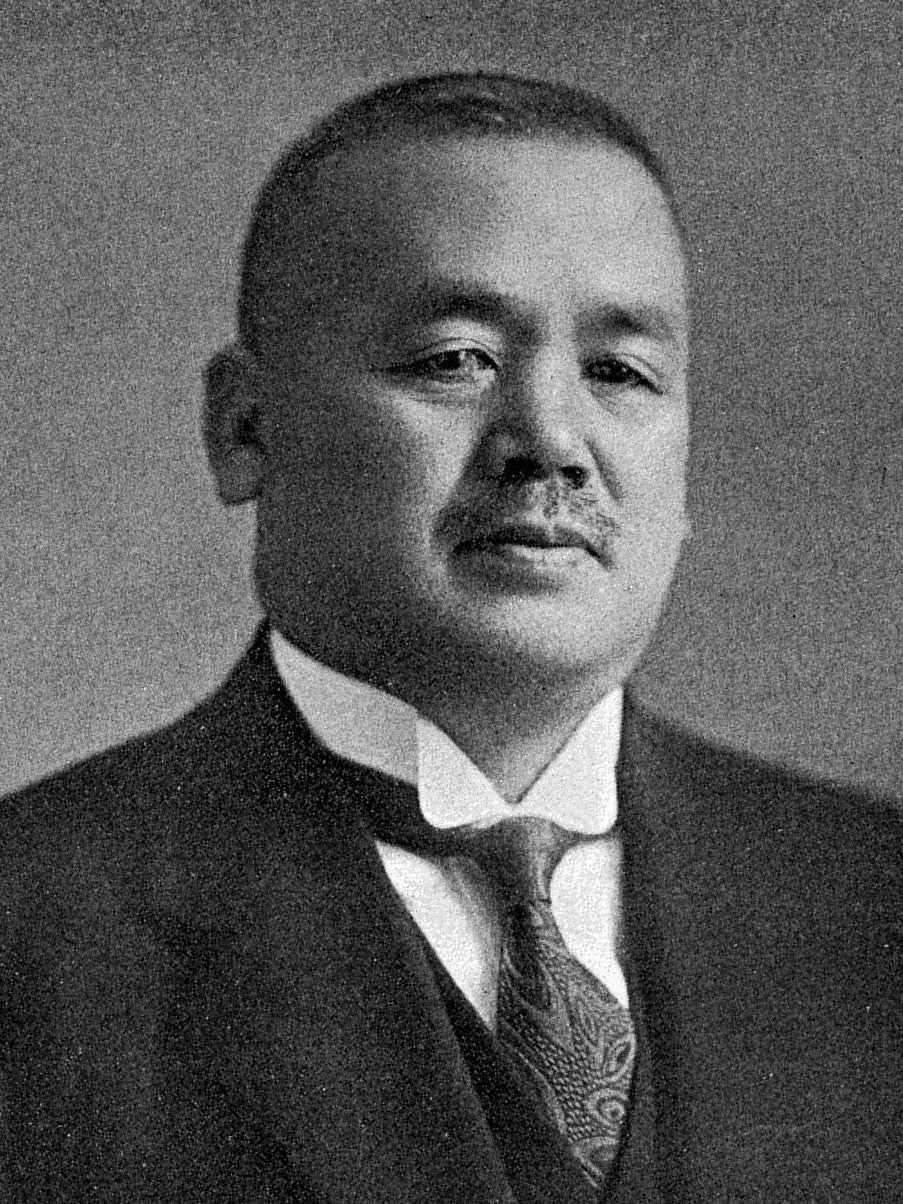
- Nakajima in 1932

Minister of Commerce and Industry
- In office 26 August 1945 – 9 October 1945
- Prime Minister: Naruhiko Higashikuni
- Preceded by: Hideki Tojo (1943)
- Succeeded by: Sankurō Ogasawara

Minister of Munitions
- In office 17 August 1945 – 26 August 1945
- Prime Minister: Naruhiko Higashikuni
- Preceded by: Teijirō Toyoda
- Succeeded by: Office abolished

Minister of Railways
- In office 4 June 1937 – 9 January 1939
- Prime Minister: Fumimaro Konoe
- Preceded by: Takuo Godō
- Succeeded by: Yonezō Maeda

Member of the House of Representatives
- In office 21 February 1930 – 18 December 1945
- Preceded by: Mutō Kinkichi
- Succeeded by: Constituency abolished
- Constituency: Gunma 1st

Personal details
- Born: 1 January 1884 Nitta, Gunma, Japan
- Died: 29 October 1949 (aged 65) Mitaka, Tokyo, Japan
- Resting place: Tama Cemetery
- Party: IRAA (1940–1945)
- Other political affiliations: Rikken Seiyūkai (1930–1940)
- Children: Gentarō Nakajima
- Relatives: Yōjirō Nakajima (grandson)
- Education: Naval War College; Imperial Japanese Naval Academy

Chikuhei Nakajima (中島 知久平, Nakajima Chikuhei; January 1, 1884 – October 29, 1949), was a Japanese businessman, naval engineer, naval officer, and politician who was most notable for having founded Nakajima Aircraft Company in 1917, a major supplier of airplanes in the Empire of Japan. He also served as a cabinet minister.

== Early life ==
Nakajima was born in Nitta District, Gunma, (currently part of Ōta city), where his father was a farmer. Nakajima attended the Imperial Japanese Naval Engineering School, graduating from the 15th class in 1907 and was promoted to Ensign in 1908. On October 27, 1911, he piloted Japan’s first airship. He was promoted to a lieutenant in the Imperial Japanese Navy the same year. After graduating from the Naval Staff College in 1912, he was sent for further studies to the United States, where he became the 3rd Japanese to receive a pilot’s license upon graduation from a flight school established by Glenn Curtiss. In 1915, he drafted the first paper advocating for the bombing of civilians to crush a nation's resistance/morale, this is also known as terror bombing. On his return to Japan, he designed an improved version of the Farman float plane for the Imperial Japanese Navy.

Nakajima was dispatched as a military attaché to Europe in 1916, to observe first-hand the use of aircraft in combat. On his return to Japan in 1917, he resigned from the military as a Lieutenant, and opened a company to produce aircraft in Japan in his hometown of Ōta in Gunma Prefecture. Nakajima received financial support from fellow engineer Seibei Kawanishi, and the company was called Nihon Hikoki Seisakusho KK (Japanese Aeroplane Manufacturing Work Co. Ltd). This company became the Nakajima Aircraft Company after the partners split in 1919, and the same year, the new company received its first order for 20 aircraft from the Japanese military.

== Political career ==
Nakajima first ran for public office during the 1930 General Election, when he was elected to the Lower House of the Diet of Japan with the support of the Rikken Seiyūkai political party. He turned control of Nakajima Aircraft over to his brother in 1931 in order to devote his efforts to politics full-time, and was subsequently re-elected four times from the Gunma No. 1 Electoral District.

From June 1937 through January 1939, Nakajima served as Railway Minister under the Konoe administration. Nakajima also headed an influential political faction within the Rikken Seiyūkai. He was awarded with the Order of the Sacred Treasure, 2nd class.

Nakajima was highly critical of the decision by Japan to declare war on the United States, and warned of the dangers posed by America’s industrial strength and production capabilities and growing air power. He was outraged by the decision of the Japanese military to abandon his project for a long-range bomber capable of striking at targets in North America. Although Nakajima was forced to join the Taisei Yokusankai, he was vocally critical of the new political organization. While recognizing the advantages of a one-party system, he accused it of being unconstitutional and of attempting to create a new shogunate.

After the surrender of Japan, Prime Minister Higashikuni asked Nakajima to accept the cabinet posts of Minister of Munitions (which he held for a week until it was abolished) and Minister of Commerce and Industry (which he held for just over a month). Afterwards, he was arrested along with all other members of the former Japanese government by the Supreme Commander of the Allied Powers and was held in Sugamo Prison for trial for war crimes. Nakajima was released on parole before his trial came to court in 1947. In 1949, while at his home in Mitaka, Tokyo, he died of an intracranial hemorrhage. His grave is at the Tama Cemetery in Fuchū, Tokyo.

== See also ==
- Nakajima Aircraft Company
- Subaru Corporation (the successor to his original company, it was known as Fuji Heavy Industries until 2017)

Political offices
Preceded by Takuo Godō	Minister of Railways; Jun 1937 - Jan 1939	Succeeded by Yonezō Maeda
Preceded by Teijirō Toyoda	Minister of Munitions; Aug 1945 - Aug 1945	Succeeded by position abolished
Preceded by Nobusuke Kishi	Minister of Commerce and Industry; Aug 1945 - Oct 1945	Succeeded by Saburō Ogasawara
