= Takuo Godō =

Japanese politician

- 伍堂 卓雄
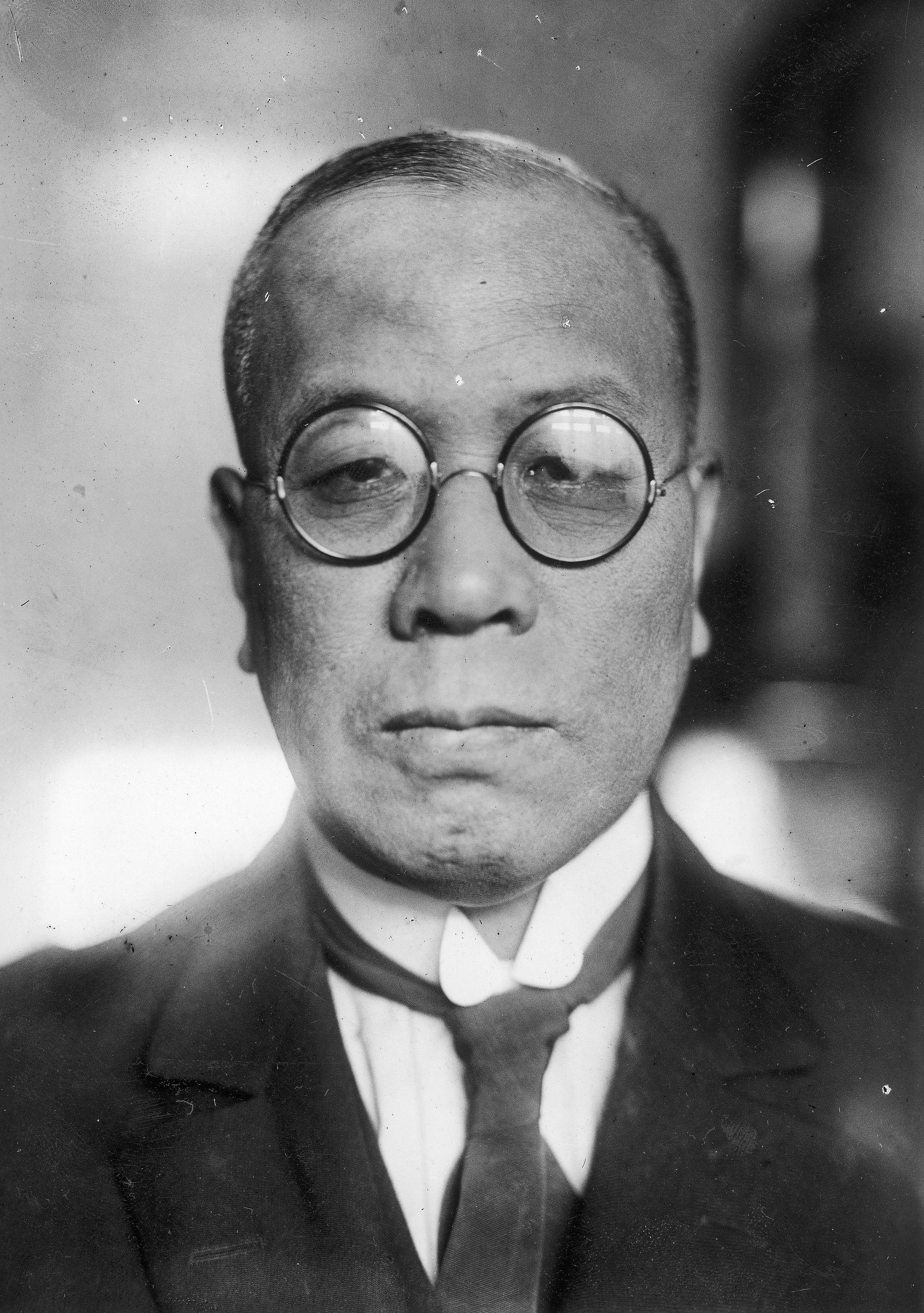

Minister of Commerce and Industry
- In office 30 August 1939 – 16 January 1940
- Prime Minister: Nobuyuki Abe
- Preceded by: Yoshiaki Hatta
- Succeeded by: Ginjirō Fujiwara
- In office 2 February 1937 – 4 June 1937
- Prime Minister: Senjūrō Hayashi
- Preceded by: Gōtarō Ogawa
- Succeeded by: Shinji Yoshino

Minister of Agriculture and Forestry
- In office 30 August 1939 – 16 October 1939
- Prime Minister: Nobuyuki Abe
- Preceded by: Yukio Sakurauchi
- Succeeded by: Sakai Tadamasa

Minister of Railways
- In office 2 February 1937 – 4 June 1937
- Prime Minister: Senjūrō Hayashi
- Preceded by: Yonezō Maeda
- Succeeded by: Chikuhei Nakajima

Member of the House of Peers
- In office 31 May 1937 – 5 April 1946 Nominated by the Emperor

Personal details
- Born: 23 September 1877 Awajichō, Tokyo, Japan
- Died: 7 April 1956 (aged 78) Ōta, Tokyo, Japan
- Resting place: Tama Cemetery
- Party: Independent
- Education: Tokyo Imperial University
- Occupation: Engineer, admiral, entrepreneur, politician

Takuo Godō (伍堂 卓雄, Godō Takuo; 23 September 1877 – 7 April 1956) was a naval architect, vice admiral in the Imperial Japanese Navy, entrepreneur and cabinet minister in the pre-war Empire of Japan.

== Biography ==
Godō was born in Tokyo to an ex-medical doctor (gotten-i) family. He graduated from Tokyo Imperial University in 1901 with a degree in naval engineering, and was accepted into the Imperial Japanese Navy's Engineering Department. He rapidly rose through the ranks, serving as a military attaché to the United Kingdom as a lieutenant commander from June 1911 to July 1913, and to the United States as a captain from May 1917 to January 1918, and June 1919 to June 1920. He was promoted to rear admiral in December 1922 and became commandant of Kure Naval Arsenal in June 1924. In December 1926, he was promoted to vice admiral.

In 1928, Godō left the navy to accept the post of president of Showa Steel Works, based in Anshan, Manchuria, and the following year became one of the directors of the South Manchurian Railway Company. In 1937, Prime Minister Senjūrō Hayashi asked that Godō accept both the posts of Minister of Commerce and Industry and Railway Minister. He was also granted a seat in the House of Peers in the Diet of Japan. In 1938, he became chairman of both the Japan Chamber of Commerce and Industry and the Tokyo Stock Exchange. He led a Japanese trade delegation to Nazi Germany in 1938 to purchase advanced weapons and production machinery, although the German government at the time still strongly favored China in its conflict with Japan. In 1939, Prime Minister Nobuyuki Abe reappointed Godō Minister of Commerce and Industry, and simultaneously Minister of Agriculture and Forestry. He appointed Nobusuke Kishi, then still in Manchukuo, as his Vice Minister of Commerce and Industry. In 1942, Godō became chairman of the Japan Management Association. In 1945, he served as an advisor to the Ministry of Munitions.

After World War II, Godō was apprehended by American occupation authorities along with most members of the pre-war Japanese government under Class A war criminal charges. However, he was subsequently released from Sugamo Prison without coming to trial. He continued to hold the title of chairman of the Japan Management Association after his release.

== Notes ==
Political offices
Preceded by Gōtarō Ogawa	Minister of Commerce and Industry; Feb 1937 – June 1937	Succeeded by Shinji Yoshino
Preceded by Yoshiaki Hatta	Minister of Commerce and Industry; Aug 1939 – Jan 1940	Succeeded by Ginjirō Fujiwara
Preceded by Yukio Sakurauchi	Minister of Agriculture and Forestry; Aug 1939 – Oct 1939	Succeeded by Tadamasa Sakurai
Preceded by Yonezō Maeda	Railway Minister; Feb 1937 – June 1937	Succeeded by Chikuhei Nakajima
