= Ken Terajima =

Japanese Vice Admiral and Politician (1882–1972)

- 寺島 健
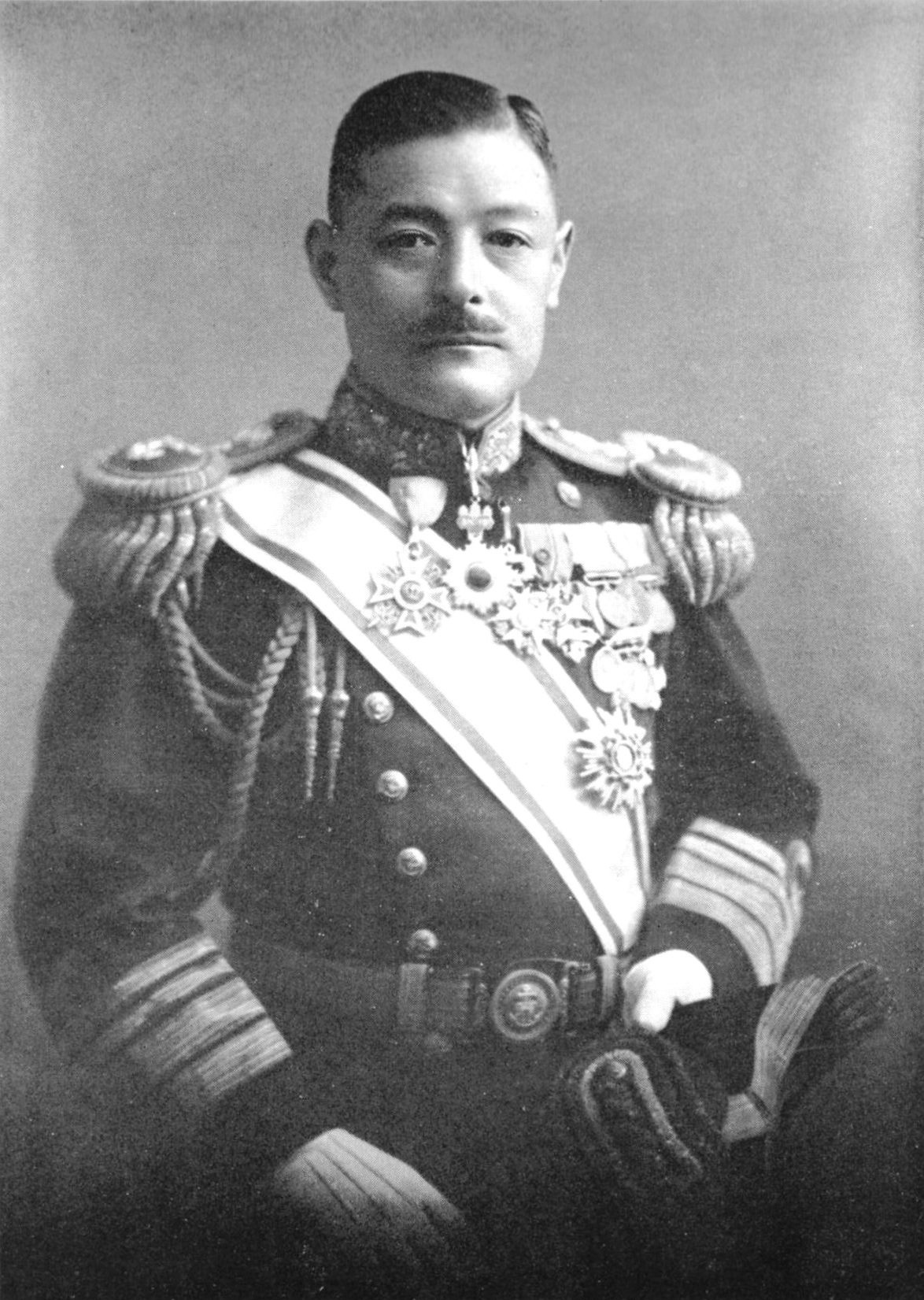

Minister of Communications
- In office 18 October 1941 – 8 October 1943
- Prime Minister: Hideki Tojo
- Preceded by: Shōzō Murata
- Succeeded by: Yoshiaki Hatta

Minister of Railways
- In office 18 October 1941 – 2 December 1941
- Prime Minister: Hideki Tojo
- Preceded by: Shōzō Murata
- Succeeded by: Yoshiaki Hatta

Personal details
- Born: 23 September 1882 Tanabe, Wakayama, Japan
- Died: 30 October 1972 (aged 90) Tokyo, Japan
- Spouse: Etsuko Yamaoka
- Education: Imperial Japanese Naval Academy

Military service
- Allegiance: Empire of Japan
- Branch: Imperial Japanese Navy
- Years of service: 1903–1934
- Rank: Vice Admiral
- Battles/wars: Russo-Japanese War; Battle of Port Arthur; Battle of the Yellow Sea; Battle of Tsushima; World War I; World War II

Ken Terajima (寺島健, Terajima Ken; 23 September 1882 – 30 October 1972) was a Japanese Vice Admiral and politician. He served as the Minister of Communications from 18 October 1941 to 8 October 1943, and Minister of Railways from 18 October 1941 to 2 December 1941, in the Tōjō Cabinet.

== Family ==
During the Sengoku period, the Terajima family served Takeda Nobutora. From the mid-Edo period, they were retainers of the Ando family, chief vassals of the Kishu Tokugawa clan. Terajima's father, Yoshinari Terajima, was employed by the Wakayama prefectural government. Ken Terajima, the fourth son of Yoshinari, was married to Etsuko, the fourth daughter of Omoto Tomomichi.

== Early naval career ==
Terajima attended Wakayama Junior High School as he took a personal admiration of the student uniforms of the Imperial Japanese Naval Academy, notably the ones of Yonejiro Okamoto and Kichisaburō Nomura, who were enrolled in the Naval Academy as junior high school seniors. There were 1,374 applicants and 200 passed the exam, Terajima, who had taken the exam after completing the fourth year of junior high school, was ranked 16th. Terajima raised his rank as the school year progressed and graduated in 4th place in his class. Among the classmates of the 31st class of Marines who graduated in December 1903, Kiyoshi Hasegawa and others became his lifelong best friends. (Note: They both promised to chair each other's funeral committee. When Hasegawa died, Terajima fulfilled that promise.)

== Russo-Japanese War ==
The 31st class of Marines would begin practical training in the Training Fleet but the Training Fleet would be disbanded due to the intensifying conflict between Japan and Russia. During the Russo-Japanese War, Terajima was assigned to the 1st Fleet, 1st Squadron except for the time when he temporarily came aboard the Mikasa to assist Saneyuki Akiyama when Kenkichi Okuda, a staff officer of the Combined Fleet, was killed in action. He enlisted as a crew member of Shikishima and fought in the Battle of Port Arthur, the Battle of the Yellow Sea, and the Battle of Tsushima. When Hatsuse and Yashima were struck by lightning, Terajima was credited with rescuing survivors as a shortboat commander. After the war, he was awarded the Order of the Rising Sun, Sixth Class.

== Submarine career ==
After the war, Terajima travelled to the United Kingdom with Yuriichi Edahara aboard the Kashima and worked as a gunnery officer. Trusted by his superior Gunnery Chief Toyokazu Yamaoka, Terajima married Etsuko Yamaoka who was Yamaoka's younger sister. After returning to Japan, at the recommendation of Kenji Ide, who contributed to the introduction of submersibles, he worked in the early submarine corps. He briefly commanded "Submarine No. 6". On April 15, 1910 while under the command of Captain Tsutomu Sakuma during a training dive, an exposed air intake pipe flooded the vessel, and he succeeded in surfacing with the help of a sergeant. Terajima tried to improve the ventilator that caused the accident, and took measures to prevent accidents, such as assigning personnel to the valves of the ventilator. While mourning Tsutomu Sakuma's death, Terajima noted that the ventilator being left unmanned was the cause of the accident.

== Naval War College ==
After graduating from Class B of the Naval War College and its specialized course, he became an officer specializing in navigation and served as chief navigator on the Tsushima and Chitose as well as a staff officer of the 3rd Fleet. He then graduated from the first selection of the 31st class of the Marine Corps to Class A of the Naval War College with Hasegawa, Takayoshi Katō and Mitsumasa Yonai being in the same class. According to Terajima himself, his grades at Marine University weren't excellent. Terajima's biography cites that the reason for this was that he didn't pander to his instructors. While he was in school, he was promoted to the rank of Lieutenant Commander. After graduation he was appointed as a staff officer of the military general staff.

== World War I ==
During World War I, Terajima went to the front as a staff officer of the 2nd Fleet under the command of Yamaya Tanin while still enrolled in the General Staff under the command of Tetsutarō Satō, the leader of the Second Group. The 1st Southern Expeditionary Corps moved to the South Seas to search for the German Eastern Fleet, but did not locate or engage the fleet. Major Tokunosuke Tanii, who was an alumnus of Terajima's junior high school and was in the Marine Corps class, was killed in action. In February 1916, he was ordered to be stationed in France and then became an aide to the military attaché. While attempting to learn French, Terajima conducted surveys and reports on French Navy submarines. He returned to Japan and met again with military attaché Kichisaburō Nomura and his aide Kiyoshi Hasegawa. After returning to Japan, he was the Vice Commander of Hirado. The deputy commander assisted the captain and managed the Hirado's affairs and achieved good results and received a commendation from the Commander-in-Chief of the Second Fleet, Yamaya Tanin.

== Hirohito's visit to Western Europe ==
Emperor Hirohito made a visit to Western Europe when he was the crown prince, and he chose Katori as his flagship and Kashima' as his companion ship. Terajima was selected as the senior staff officer of the 3rd Fleet consisting of these two ships. Commander-in-Chief Kozaburo Oguri who had a wealth of international experience, was appointed to the top of the unit and in consideration of the long-distance voyage, Terajima, Hisamori Taguchi, Norikazu Kanna and a navigation officer were selected as the other officers. Terajima was in charge of drafting the plan, and this visit, which lasted almost half a year, ended successfully. Terajima served as an instructor at the Naval War College for one year, was promoted to captain in December 1922, and was appointed military attaché to France. During his two years in office, he served as a member of the Treaty of Versailles Implementation Committee, and was also involved in dealing with the accident involving Prince Naruhisa Kitashirakawa.

== Chief of staff of the fleet ==
In December 1924, he was appointed adjutant to the adjutant general of the Imperial Japanese Navy, and served for about two years. After serving as captain of the Yamashiro, he was promoted to rear admiral in December 1927 and served as chief of staff of the Second Fleet for one year. From December of the following year he served as chief of staff of the First Fleet and Combined Fleet for a year. The chief of staff of the Combined Fleet was a position in which a person required sufficient physical strength due to the hard work and was excellent in strategy and combat command ability. He assisted Yasuhei Yoshikawa and Koshiro Otani at the Second Fleet and Shoshin Taniguchi at the Combined Fleet. During the training of the Combined Fleet, aircraft belonging to the 1st Air Force under Commander Sankichi Takahashi, the Akagi under Captain Isoroku Yamamoto and Hōshō under Captain Goro Hara were unable to return in time due to sudden weather changes which resulted in an accident in which six people died. Terajima submitted a request to withdraw, but Commissioner Taniguchi rejected it. Zengo Yoshida, who was the captain of the Combined Fleet flagship Mutsu at the time, criticized Taniguchi and Terajima. His goal was that the chief of staff would have to give more guidance to the staff. However, the gunnery chief of Mutsu said that Terajima led the staff under Yasutaro Iwashita and that the staff admired Terajima.

== Senior Adjutant ==
In December 1924, Terajima was appointed Senior Adjutant to the Ministry of Navy. Takuzo Hanai, a member of the House of Peers, asked Hirohito who should be in charge of supporting the organization of the Army and Navy and the reserves. Opinions were divided among scholars, and the navy thought that the navy minister was the advisor to Article 12 and was also responsible for Article 11, while the army's chief of staff was the advisor to Article 11. was also responsible for Article 12. Terajima was selected as a member of the drafting committee for the reply. At that time, Terajima confirmed the intentions of Gensui Yoshika Inoue and Tōgō Heihachirō under the order of Minister of the Navy Takeshi Takarabe. Tōgō agreed with the idea that one of Takarabe's 12 advisors should be the Minister of the Navy, while Inoue believed that the Navy Minister Saigō Jūdō, as a civil officer, had decided the number of troops, and the intention of the military generals was not accepted. Due to this, the military minister pointed out that the system had been changed to a military minister and expressed concern about the support in the event that a civilian minister was born in the future. In the end, a discussion was held with Kantarō Suzuki, Chief of Naval General Staff, Katō Kanji, Commander-in-Chief of Yokosuka Naval Base, and furthermore with the Army, it was concluded that "The Minister of the Army and Navy is responsible for providing constitutional support for the prerogatives of Article 12 of the Constitution, but the military strength is limited. Regarding this, it was decided that the Chief of the General Staff and the Chief of the Naval General Staff would assist the Emperor."

=== Director of Education ===
In June 1930, he was appointed Director of the Education Bureau. This office was responsible for Navy education and training. Terajima was trying to improve the education of young officers who had become fashionable during his tenure, and to return to the previous method from the Dalton Plan education at the military academy. In addition, he enacted the Naval Training Air Corps educational guidelines and accepted foreign students from the Turkish Navy.

== Organization of the Imperial General Headquarters ==
In May 1932, Terashima took charge of the centre of Naval Military Administration as Director of the Education Bureau and Director of the Military Affairs Bureau. During Terashima's tenure as head of the Military Affairs Bureau, the May 15 incident was dealt with and the Naval General Staff held a discussion with the Ministry of Navy on revisions to the Naval General Staff Ordinance and inter-ministry inter-departmental regulations. This business discussion wasn't a sudden one and the movement aimed at expanding the authority of the Naval General Staff can be seen since Yūzaburō Katō and Kakuichi Murakami were navy ministers. However, the attempts of Hayao Shimamura, Deputy Director Tetsutarō Satō, Gentarō Yamashita, Kanji Katō, and Saburo Horiuchi didn't materialize. In addition, the reason for requesting the expansion of the authority of the Military General Staff was the concern that a civil official would be appointed as Minister of Military Affairs. In 1930, at the time of the London Naval Treaty, the issue of supreme command was violated. Regarding the interpretation of Article 11 of Article 11, ``The Minister of State shall not be responsible for assisting the supreme command which called for the deletion of the following proviso. The Ministry of Navy objected, and Japan remained unable to come to a conclusion as a nation. The Navy resolved at the Military Councilor's Conference that the number of troops should be determined by the agreement of the Minister of the Navy and the Chief of the General Staff. In terms of personnel affairs after the London Naval Treaty, on the recommendation of Tōgō, Prince Fushimi Hiroyasu, who had a view toward the military general office, obtained a resolution of the Military Council and assumed the post of Chief of the Naval General Staff. His predecessor, Naval General Staff Naomasa Taniguchi, was the successor to Kanji Katō who resigned after the London Naval Treaty and was reluctant to resign.

The Imperial General Staff, headed by the imperial family, first succeeded in organizing the Imperial General Headquarters and revising the Wartime Imperial General Headquarters Service Order. This expanded the wartime authority of the General Staff, which was smaller than the General Staff Headquarters, and Chiaki Matsuda was in charge of the General Staff. However, this revision did not affect peacetime and was limited. Subsequently, the Naval General Staff prepared a revision plan with Tameji Okada as the chief executive and tried to strengthen the formation of the Naval General Staff. Although the Ministry of Navy, including Chief of the Military Affairs Bureau Terajima, resisted and the meeting between Deputy Chief Miyoshi Takahashi and Navy Minister Okada was in a state of quarrel and with Okada's signature of "I saw it", the order was issued under the authority of the Chief of the Navy General Staff. The Ministry of Navy continued to resist without allocating additional personnel, but Takahashi and Prince Fushimi negotiated with the Director of the Personnel Bureau Kiyoshi Abu and they were assigned to the newly established Military General Staff Division 4 Chief.

== Revision of the Military General Ordinance ==
In January 1933, Chief of Naval General Staff Fushimi, Minister of the Navy Mineo Ōsumi, Chief of Staff Prince Kan'in Kotohito, and Minister of War Sadao Araki signed a document titled Determination of Force Capacity. In the document, it was written that "the Chief of the General Staff and the Chief of the Military General Staff will formulate the military strength" and it was sent from Kanji Katō to the Privy Councilor Kentarō Kaneko. The document overturned the navy's conventional way of thinking about Article 12 of the above-mentioned constitution and stood in the same position as the General Staff. In March of the same year, the Naval General Staff submitted a proposal to the Ministry of the Navy to revise the Naval General Staff Ordinance and inter-ministerial negotiation regulations. The major executives of the ministry at that time were as follows, with Terajima and Inoue of the Ministry of the Navy classified into the treaty faction and Prince Fushimi, Takahashi, and Nagumo of the Naval General Staff classified into the fleet faction.

Ministry of the Navy

- Minister Mineo Ōsumi
- Vice Minister Fujita Naonori
- Head of the Military Affairs Bureau Ken Terashima
- Section 1 Chief Narumi Inoue

Military General Staff

- Chief of the military command Fushimi Hiroyasu
- Deputy Director Sankichi Takahashi
- 1st group leader Shigetaro Shimada
- Second Section Chief Chuichi Nagumo

The draft revision covers a wide range of fields, but the important point is that the Chief of the Naval General Staff "participated in matters related to national defence armaments and transfers them to the Minister of the Navy after the appraisal" was changed to "manage the plans for national defence armaments and deal with armaments". In addition, the scope of "arms" was decided to be defined in the inter-ministry negotiation regulations, and even in the inter-departmental negotiation regulations, the authority was transferred from the Navy Ministry to the Naval General Staff. In addition, this proposal does not even have the right to draft. The revised proposal was brought to Military Affairs Bureau member Kōno Senmanshirō and his superior, the first section manager, Narumi Inoue, handled it himself and didn't approve the revised proposal in negotiations with Chuichi Nagumo. Inoue's attitude was based on the understanding of both Terashima and Fujita. Inoue's reasons for opposition are broadly divided into three points, and are quoted from "Omoide no ki" written for the class meeting only.

*(1) The Minister of the Navy is in charge of a part of the Commander-in-Chief's affairs, and is responsible for providing assistance (constitutionally) in this regard. This is peculiar to the military minister based on the special nature of the military, and it is natural for the minister to fulfil his responsibility as the minister of state.

- (2) State affairs related to commanders-in-chief under the jurisdiction of the Minister of Military Affairs require extremely deep specialized knowledge and experience. Therefore, the military minister must be a communist. By the way, we should be able to compete in our duties if we have seniors whom we respect as ministers. !! is our strong feeling without reason. A drastic reduction in the authority of ministers, as requested by the military generals, will give a powerful weapon to the theory of civilian ministers.
- (3) The Chief of the General Staff is not a subordinate of the Minister. Nor is it a constitutional body, so he has no constitutional responsibility. (In a good position) does not take responsibility under the law. It is against the principles of constitutional politics and dangerous to give a person who is not under the jurisdiction of the minister a great deal of power.

This third term was not unique to Inoue, but was a concept that basically existed within the navy. In June, negotiations moved to Terajima and Shimada, but Terajima objected with a strong attitude, agreeing only on two or three of the revised terms, and rejecting the rest. According to Terajima, he said to Prince Fushimi: "The system must have a system of responsibility without mistakes" which displeased Prince Fushimi. The situation reached a stalemate, and even after the negotiations shifted between Vice Minister Fujita and Deputy Chief Takahashi, and Navy Minister Ōsumi and Deputy Chief Takahahi, no resolution was reached. Thus, the navy's traditional superiority over the navy's naval general was broken. Prime Minister Minoru Saito, former Minister of the Navy, and Chief Chamberlain Kantarō Suzuki, former Chief of the Naval General Staff, expressed dissatisfaction with this agreement. Hirohito, who received the proposal from Ōsumi, was concerned about the excessive intervention of the military general staff in matters under the jurisdiction of the Ministry of Navy, and asked Ōsumi to submit a document to see if it could be avoided.

After this agreement Terashima told Kumao Harada about behind-the-scenes circumstances such as the movements of Kanji Katō, Kentarō Kaneko, Ōsumi, and Prince Fushimi and that he tried to stop the revision. However, Terajima also tried to persuade Inoue, who continued to resist until the end. Terajima's words were, "Due to certain circumstances, we have had to carry out revisions based on this final draft of the military general office. The chief of the bureau himself will be criticized for revising the system based on such a stupid naval general draft, so it's a shame. Would you agree with this proposal?" Inoue didn't compromise on the words of his direct superior, Terajima.

In September, Terajima was transferred to Commander of the Training Squadron. This position was a prominent position for practical training for second lieutenant candidates who had graduated from the Imperial Japanese Naval Academy. However, he was ordered to serve in the General Staff the following month, and in March of the following year, at the age of 52, he was transferred to the reserve. Around this time, Terajima left a Chinese poem, "Because of men, it is clean and pure." Terashima's appointments were made by Naoshin Taniguchi, who was opposed to the army's move during the Mukden Incident, considering the danger of causing a war between the United States and Japan, Katsunoshin Yamanashi, who was in favor of the disarmament treaty at the London Naval Treaty, and Seizō Sakonji. It is the same movement as the treaty faction general officers such as Hori Teikichi's admission to the reserve, and is part of the so-called Daikaku personnel affairs. Terashima's departure became a problem in the Diet, and Tasuku Nakazawa, who was suspicious of a series of personnel affairs, asked Katsunoshin Yamanashi about the situation. Yamanashi cited the pressure of Prince Fushimi and Heihachiro Togo on Navy Minister Ōsumi and said, "I feel sorry for Mr. Togo's late evening".

== Business and politics ==
In November of this year, Kamesaburo Yamashita appointed Terajima as president of Uraga Docks. Upon his appointment, Terajima greeted Fushiminomiya. Uraga Docks was a company whose main business was shipbuilding, and built 62 ships, including destroyers and Seikan Ferry during the seven years of President Terajima. He also founded Tomioka Weapons Factory to manufacture 20mm machine guns. The company developed into Dainippon Weapons and Terajima concurrently served as president. The 20mm machine gun was also mounted on the Zero fighter plane, demonstrating its power. In addition, he also sounded out to Mitsumasa Yonai about the appointment of the next navy minister by Naval Minister Osamu Nagano. On 7 October 1941, the Tōjō Cabinet was established with Hideki Tōjō as the leader. Tōjō asked Koshiro Oikawa, the former Minister of the Navy, to recommend a person who would concurrently serve as Minister of Communications and Minister of Railways and he recommended Terajima. When Terajima met with Tōjō, he stated that he was unsuitable for the position because he was said to be an avoider of war but was persuaded by Tōjō. Terashima accepted the appointment with the consent of Kamesaburo Yamashita. He was the Minister of Railways until December of this year and the Minister of Communications until October 1943. His resignation from the Minister of Communications was due to the establishment of the Ministry of Transportation and Communications through the merger of the Ministry of Railways and the Ministry of Communications. After the war, he was arrested as a Class-A war criminal by the Allies but wasn't charged and released in 1948. During this time, he was expelled from public office and in 1952; his expulsion was lifted when the peace treaty took effect.
