= Teijirō Toyoda =

Imperial Japanese Navy admiral (1885–1961)

- 豊田 貞次郎
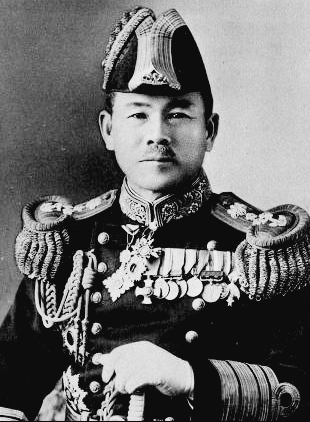
- Toyoda in 1940

Minister of Munitions
- In office 7 April 1945 – 17 August 1945
- Prime Minister: Kantarō Suzuki
- Preceded by: Shigeru Yoshida
- Succeeded by: Chikuhei Nakajima

Minister of Transport and Communications
- In office 7 April 1945 – 11 April 1945
- Prime Minister: Kantarō Suzuki
- Preceded by: Yonezō Maeda
- Succeeded by: Naoto Kobiyama

Minister for Foreign Affairs
- In office 18 July 1941 – 18 October 1941
- Prime Minister: Fumimaro Konoe
- Preceded by: Yōsuke Matsuoka
- Succeeded by: Shigenori Tōgō

Minister of Colonial Affairs
- In office 18 July 1941 – 18 October 1941
- Prime Minister: Fumimaro Konoe
- Preceded by: Kiyoshi Akita
- Succeeded by: Shigenori Tōgō

Minister of Commerce and Industry
- In office 4 April 1941 – 18 July 1941
- Prime Minister: Fumimaro Konoe
- Preceded by: Ichizō Kobayashi
- Succeeded by: Sakonji Seizō

Personal details
- Born: 7 August 1885 Tanabe, Wakayama, Japan
- Died: 21 November 1961 (aged 76) Tokyo, Japan
- Resting place: Aoyama Cemetery

Military service
- Allegiance: Empire of Japan
- Branch/service: Imperial Japanese Navy
- Years of service: 1905–1941
- Rank: Admiral
- Commands: Abukuma, Yamashiro, Naval Affairs Bureau, Hiro Naval Arsenal, Kure Naval Arsenal, Sasebo Naval District, Naval Aviation Bureau, Naval Construction Bureau
- Battles/wars: World War I World War II

Teijirō Toyoda (豊田 貞次郎, Toyoda Teijirō; August 7, 1885 – November 21, 1961) was a career naval officer who served as Minister for Foreign Affairs in 1941 and as admiral in the Imperial Japanese Navy during World War II.

== Early life and education ==
Toyoda was born in Wakayama Prefecture as the son of a former samurai retainer of the Wakayama Domain. He studied at Tennoji junior high school before entering the Tokyo Foreign Languages School where he studied English. He graduated as the top student out of 171 cadets in the 33rd term of the Imperial Japanese Naval Academy in 1905. The Russo-Japanese War ended in November 1905 during the time of Toyoda's graduation and he was assigned as a midshipman to serve in Southeast Asia on the cruisers Itsukushima and Katori, destroyer Yayoi, and cruiser Chitose. After completing naval artillery and torpedo warfare course, he was promoted to ensign and assigned to the battleship Shikishima, followed by Satsuma.

In 1910, Lieutenant Toyoda studied an advanced artillery course at the Navy Staff College a second grade student for a year, and then was assigned to studies in the United Kingdom, as part of an exchange program under the new Anglo-Japanese Alliance. Toyoda remained in England, studying at Oxford University for two and a half years, returning to Japan in 1914.

== Military career ==
=== World War I ===
After his return to Japan, Toyoda was appointed as squad leader of the 4th Squadron on the Hiei. During the later period of the First World War, the Empire of Germany declared unrestricted U-boat operations and attacked transport ships indiscriminately. This resulted in a request by the United Kingdom for Japan to send warships to escort transports under the terms of the Anglo-Japanese Alliance. Toyoda, who had been promoted to lieutenant commander in 1916, was sent to command the 4th Squadron based in Sydney from 1917. His assignment was to patrol the sea lanes between Australia and New Zealand.

In December 1917, after the safety of Australia was secured, Toyoda returned to Japan and re-entered the Naval Staff College where he studied for two years as a first-class student. Again, he graduated the top of his class. After graduating with the rank of commander in 1920, he was appointed as a central member of staff for Naval Affairs at the Naval Department. He served for three years between 1920 and 1923.

=== Interwar years ===
After serving as executive officer for six months on Kongō, Toyoda returned to London in 1923 as a naval attaché. He lived in London for four years, during which time he was promoted to captain, and handled intelligence collected by paid-spy William Forbes-Sempill, Master of Sempill. He was then assigned as a member of the Japanese delegation to the League of Nations-sponsored Geneva Naval Conference. He returned to Japan at the end of 1927. Due to his extensive period abroad, Toyoda had become an expert on foreign affairs but knew little of the domestic situation within Japan and therefore often had conflicting views with the other members of his delegation at the disarmament talks.

After his return to Japan, Toyoda was assigned as captain of the cruiser Abukuma, followed by the battleship Yamashiro.

Toyoda was called upon again for the London Naval Disarmament Talks and returned to England again as a member of the Japanese delegation. After the treaty was signed he returned to Japan and was promoted to rear admiral.

In 1931, Toyoda was appointed as commander of the Yokosuka Naval District. However, after only six months, he was relieved from the position. It is supposed that the dismissal was caused by something Toyoda said to Prince Fushimi Hiroyasu, who had been newly appointed as head of the Imperial Japanese Navy General Staff.

Although his military specialty was in naval artillery, Toyoda was reassigned to flight navigation headquarters. In November 1932, at the time of periodic personnel transfer, he was placed in charge of a military aircraft factory at Hiroshima. Both assignments were considered demotions; however, Toyoda renewed his efforts and waited for an opportunity with a positive outlook. As Toyoda's grasp of aircraft technology slowly increased, he became dissatisfied with factory operations, as it was difficult to obtain the necessary tools and parts. Toyoda took steps to improve productivity.

In November 1935, Toyoda was promoted to vice admiral, and by February 1936, he had become director of the Kure Naval Arsenal. In December 1937, he was reassigned as commander of the Sasebo Naval District.

In November 1938, Toyoda became commander of the Imperial Japanese Navy Air Service, and during three months in the summer of 1939, he jointly managed the Naval Shipbuilding Command.

== Political career ==
In 1940, Navy Minister Zengo Yoshida resigned. Despite opposition by Naval Minister Koshirō Oikawa, the Tripartite Pact between Japan, Nazi Germany and Fascist Italy was signed. Toyoda, who also personally opposed the treaty, became Vice Minister of the Navy on September 6, 1940.

In April 1941, the cabinet was reorganized and Toyoda was requested by Prime Minister Fumimaro Konoe to become Minister of Commerce and Industry. After careful consideration, Toyoda decided to leave the Imperial Japanese Navy; however, his letter of resignation was not accepted and he was promoted to full admiral and transferred to reserve duty instead. Admiral Mineichi Koga, who had switched to the world of politics as well, was critical of Toyoda's attempted resignation, accusing him of using the navy as a stepping stone to a political career.

After only three months, a cabinet reshuffle became necessary due to the forced resignation of the increasingly strident pro-Axis Foreign Minister Yōsuke Matsuoka. Toyoda, who had earlier opposed the Tripartite Pact and was vocal in this opposition to prospects for war with the Soviet Union, replaced Matsuoka as Minister of Foreign Affairs on July 18, 1941. One of his first priorities was to attempt to smooth over the rapidly deteriorating diplomatic relations with the United States, and he dispatched Admiral Kichisaburō Nomura as ambassador to Washington DC. Toyoda also advanced plans for a face to face meeting between Prime Minister Konoe and American President Franklin D. Roosevelt. However, the negotiations failed to occur. In July, Toyoda also predicted that the further Japanese aggression southwards per the Nanshin-ron policy, and specifically plans for the Japanese occupation of French Indochina, would lead to a total trade embargo by the United States, if not war. In October 1941, the entire Konoe Cabinet resigned.

== Later career ==
After his resignation from the cabinet, Toyoda accepted the post of director of the nationalized Japan Iron and Steel Works. He was finally able to pursue his interest in improving steel production, a topic in which he had shown much interest since his days as director of the Kure Naval Arsenal. Between the last half of 1941 and the first half of 1942, Japanese steel production decreased for lack of workers. Toyoda improved work methods and initiated welfare programs for children who had graduated from junior high school and for Korean workers as well as for those who had lost their jobs. By ensuring that there was always a steady work force, work conditions improved, which allowed steel production to keep up with war-created worsening conditions that created problems in maintaining the necessary amount of resources.

Toyoda remained distant from politics but in March 1943 he was called to be a special adviser to the Cabinet. There was intense confrontation between the army and navy over how war materials should be allocated between them. While Toyoda provided a formula to resolve this problem, it did not go according to plan.

Toyoda once again became a cabinet minister during the Suzuki administration and was appointed Minister for Transportation and Communications as well as Minister of Munitions. With an increasing portion of Japan's industrial base and infrastructure damaged by Allied air raids, Toyoda struggled to improve efficiency and to increase production levels, particularly that of combat aircraft.

After the surrender of Japan, most members of the wartime Japanese cabinets were accused of war crimes by the Allied occupation authorities and arrested. However, Toyoda was not prosecuted due to his efforts for peace prior to the start of the war.

In 1958, Toyoda was appointed Chairman of the Japan–Usiminas joint venture steel development in Brazil. On November 21, 1961, he died of kidney cancer at the age of 76.

== Bibliography ==
- Taliaferro, Jeffrey W. (2004). Balancing Risks: Great Power Intervention in the Periphery. Cornell University Press. ISBN 0-8014-4221-4.

Military offices
Preceded by Shiozawa Kōichi	Sasebo Naval District; Commander-in-chief; 1 December 1937 - 15 November 1938	Succeeded by Nakamura Kamezaburō
Political offices
Preceded by Sumiyama Tokutarō	Vice-Minister of the Navy; 5 September 1940 - 4 April 1941	Succeeded by Sawamoto Yorio
Preceded by Isao Kawada	Minister of Commerce and Industry; April 4, 1941 – July 18, 1941	Succeeded by Seizo Sakonji
Preceded by Yōsuke Matsuoka	Minister for Foreign Affairs; July 18, 1941 – October 18, 1941	Succeeded by Shigenori Tōgō
Preceded by Kiyoshi Akita	Minister for Colonial Affairs; July 18, 1941 – October 18, 1941	Succeeded by Shigenori Tōgō
Preceded by Yonezō Maeda	Minister for Transport and Communications; April 7, 1945 – April 9, 1945	Succeeded by Naoto Kohiyama
Preceded by Shigeru Yoshida	Minister of Munitions; April 7, 1945 – August 17, 1945	Succeeded by Chikuhei Nakajima
