= Kumakichi Nakajima =

Japanese politician

Baron Kumakichi Nakajima
- 中島 久万吉
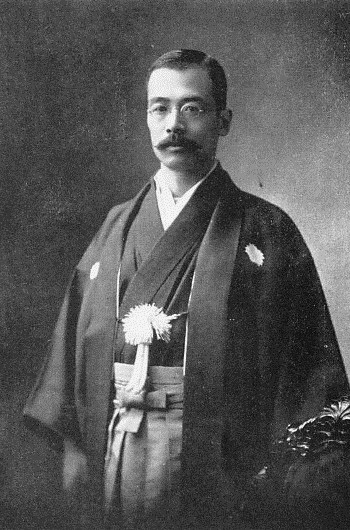

Minister of Commerce and Industry
- In office 26 May 1932 – 9 February 1934
- Prime Minister: Saitō Makoto
- Preceded by: Yonezō Maeda
- Succeeded by: Jōji Matsumoto

Member of the House of Peers
- In office 18 January 1919 – 9 July 1939 Elected by the Barons
- In office 10 July 1904 – 9 July 1911 Elected by the Barons

Personal details
- Born: 24 July 1873 Yokohama, Kanagawa, Japan
- Died: 25 April 1960 (aged 86) Hayama, Kanagawa, Japan
- Resting place: Yanaka Cemetery
- Party: Independent
- Relatives: Date Munehiro (grandfather); Mutsu Munemitsu (uncle)
- Education: Tokyo University of Commerce

Baron Kumakichi Nakajima (中島久万吉, Nakajima Kumakichi; 24 July 1873 – 25 April 1960) was an entrepreneur, politician and cabinet minister in the pre-war Empire of Japan.

== Biography ==
Nakajima was born in Yokohama. His father Baron Nakajima Nobuyuki was from Kōchi Prefecture, was the first Speaker of the House of Representatives of Japan and Japanese ambassador to Italy.

Nakajima initially entered Meiji University, but left without graduating, and obtained a degree from the Higher Commercial School (the predecessor to Hitotsubashi University) in 1897, obtaining a position at the Tokyo Stock Exchange on graduation. In 1899, he became secretary to Prime Minister Katsura Tarō and in 1906 served as secretary to Prime Minister Saionji Kinmochi.

In 1907, Nakajima went to work for the mining consortium Fukukawa Kogyo. He helped establish Josai University in 1918. In 1920, Nakajima was instrumental in joining Furukawa Electric, Fuji Electric, Yokohama Rubber and a number of smaller companies into the Furukawa Consortium, one of the 15 largest zaibatsu in pre-war Japan. In 1927, he was an influential member of the Deliberation Council within the Ministry of Commerce and Industry, pushing for increased compilation of industrial statistics, loans to small and medium businesses and export industries, and the adoption of the metric system. In 1932, Nakajima joined the Saitō Cabinet as Minister of Commerce and Industry.

In 1921, on viewing a wooden statue of Ashikaga Takauji at the temple of Seiken-ji in Shimizu-ku, Shizuoka, Nakajima had contributed a haiku poem to a literary magazine. He commented that the official educational policy vilifying Ashikaga Takauji as a traitor to the nation for his betrayal of Emperor Go-Daigo should be re-evaluated. The article was discovered by ultra-rightists and militarists eager to find leverage to embarrass and to bring down the Saitō Cabinet. Nakajima was called before the House of Peers, where he was browbeaten by retired General Baron Takeo Kikuchi and others, who forced his resignation on 2 February 1934, a date making the 600th anniversary of the Kemmu restoration.

In 1937, Nakajima was one of 16 officials arrested on trumped-up charges of corruption in the Teijin Incident. He was subsequently cleared of all charges after a lengthy trial, but withdrew from public service after this event.

After the surrender of Japan, Nakajima emerged from seclusion to become chairman of the Japan Trade Association in 1950. In 1955, he became president of the radio company, Nippon Cultural Broadcasting. He died at his villa in Hayama, Kanagawa in 1960. He was posthumously awarded the Order of the Rising Sun, 1st class.

== Notes ==
Political offices
Preceded by Yonezō Maeda	Minister of Commerce and Industry; March 1932 – Feb 1934	Succeeded by Jōji Matsumoto
