= Yukio Sakurauchi =

Japanese politician (1888–1947)

- 櫻内 幸雄
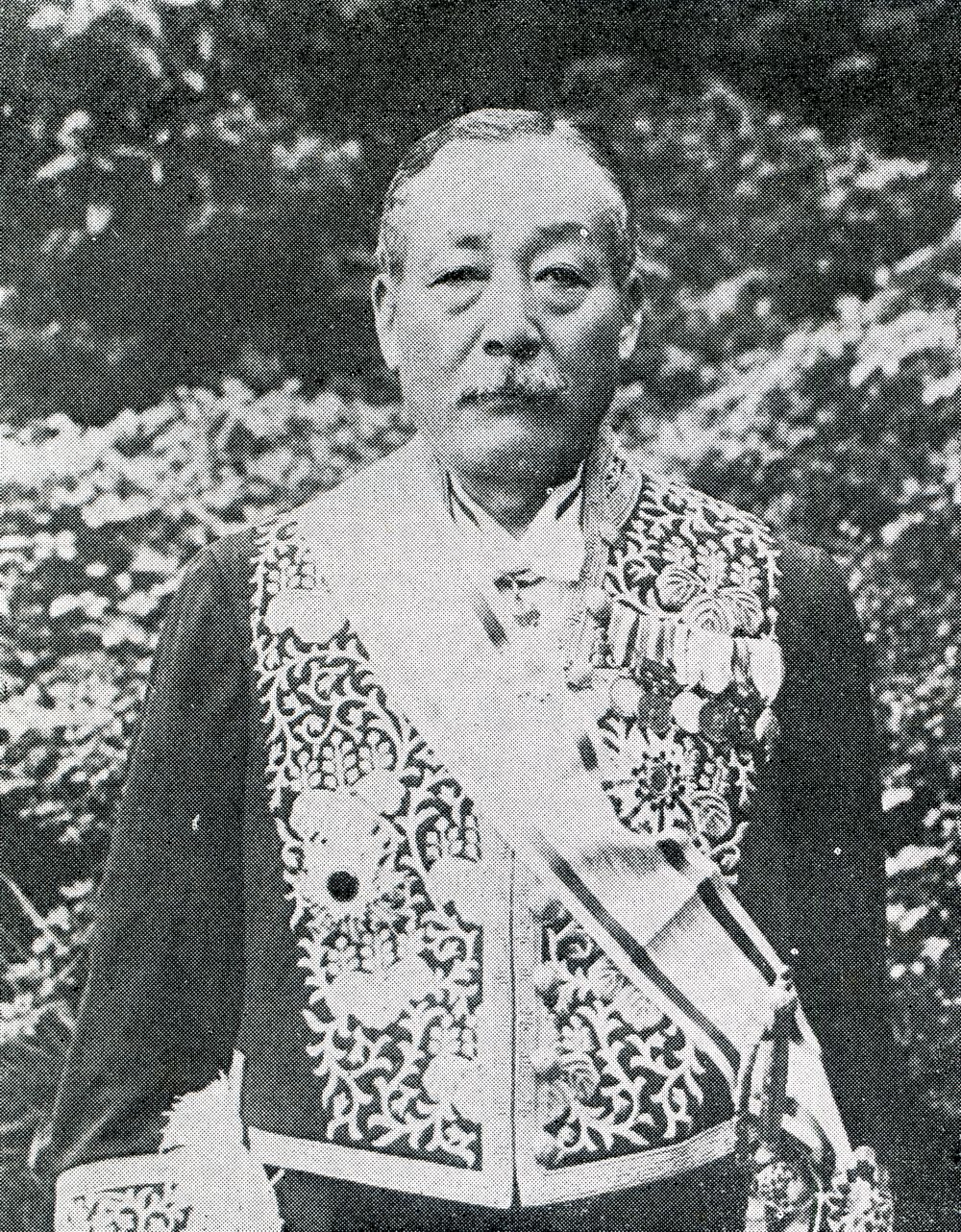
- Yukio Sakurauchi

Minister of Finance
- In office 16 January 1940 – 22 July 1940
- Prime Minister: Mitsumasa Yonai
- Preceded by: Kazuo Aoki
- Succeeded by: Isao Kawada

Minister of Agriculture and Forestry
- In office 5 January 1939 – 30 August 1939
- Prime Minister: Hiranuma Kiichirō
- Preceded by: Yoriyasu Arima
- Succeeded by: Takuo Godō

Minister of Commerce and Industry
- In office 14 April 1931 – 13 December 1931
- Prime Minister: Wakatsuki Reijirō
- Preceded by: Magoichi Tawara
- Succeeded by: Yonezō Maeda

Member of the Privy Council
- In office 19 May 1945 – 17 April 1946
- Monarch: Hirohito

Member of the House of Representatives
- In office 7 March 1920 – 19 May 1945
- Preceded by: Constituency established
- Succeeded by: Constituency abolished
- Constituency: Shimane 2nd (1920–1928); Shimane 1st (1928–1945)

Personal details
- Born: 14 October 1888 Hirose, Shimane, Japan
- Died: 9 October 1947 (aged 58) Minato, Tokyo, Japan
- Party: IRAA (1940–1945)
- Other political affiliations: Rikken Seiyūkai (1920–1924); Seiyūhontō (1924–1927); Rikken Minseitō (1927–1940)
- Children: Yoshio Sakurauchi
- Relatives: Tatsurō Sakurauchi (brother); Seiichi Ota (grandson); Tatsuo Fukuda (great-grandson)

Yukio Sakurauchi (櫻内 幸雄, Sakurauchi Yukio; 14 October 1888 – 9 October 1947) was an entrepreneur, politician and cabinet minister in the pre-war Empire of Japan. He was the father of prominent post-war politician Yoshio Sakurauchi, and grandfather of controversial politician Seiichi Ota.

== Early life ==
Sakurauchi was born in former Hirose Town Shimane Prefecture, in what is now part of the city of Yasugi, Shimane. The Sakurauchi family were former samurai in the service of Matsue Domain. His father relocated to Yonago in neighboring Tottori Prefecture in 1885, and started a company to produce and sell Water wheels. The venture did not succeed, and the family moved to Sakaiminato starting a business in commodity trading in 1886, followed by tofu production and retail sales in 1887.

Sakurauchi left home in 1893 to work in a paper mill in Yokohama in 1893 for minimal wages. In 1895, he was in Tokyo, working as a typesetter and artisan for a newspaper, becoming a reporter for the Nippon Telegraph news agency in 1902, and executive director of the Ogura Racing Association by 1907. Making a fortune in speculating in horses by 1908, he was appointed president of Saitama Electric Light Company in 1909 and president of Okayama Hydroelectric Company in 1917.

== Political career ==
Sakurauchi was elected to the Lower House of the Diet of Japan in the 1920 General Election, under the Rikken Seiyūkai banner, and was reelected for six terms. Sakurauchi became president of Ibiden company in 1925. He subsequently changed his political party affiliation to the Rikken Minseitō, and served as Secretary-General of the party in 1927.

In 1931, Prime Minister Wakatsuki Reijirō picked Sakurauchi as Minister of Commerce and Industry. He returned to the Cabinet under the Hirota administration as Minister of Agriculture and Forestry in 1939. In 1940, Sakurauchi was asked to serve as Treasury Minister under the Yonai administration. As with all other Japanese politicians, Sakurauchi was forced to join the Taisei Yokusankai created by Prime Minister Fumimaro Konoe. From May 1945 to April 1946, Sakurauchi served as a member of the Privy Council.

After the surrender of Japan, Sakurauchi was purged from public office in 1946 along with all other members of the wartime administration. He died the following year.

Political offices
Preceded by Magoichi Tawara	Minister of Commerce and Industry; 1931	Succeeded by Yonezo Maeda
Preceded by Yoriyasu Arima	Minister of Agriculture & Forestry; 1939	Succeeded by Takuo Godō
Preceded by Kazuo Aoki	Treasury Minister; 1940	Succeeded by Isao Kawada
