= Ministry of Munitions (Japan) =

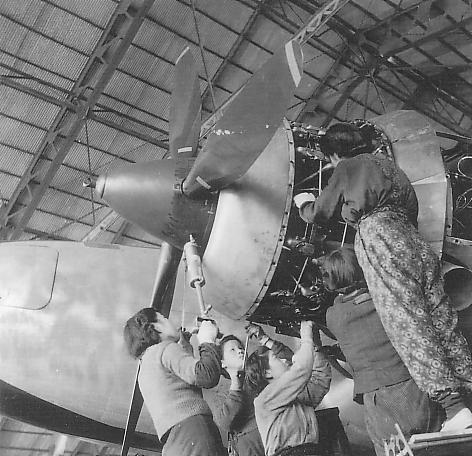
Labor Mobilization, 1944

The Ministry of Munitions (軍需省, Gunjushō) was a cabinet-level ministry in the Empire of Japan, charged with the procurement and manufacture of armaments, spare parts and munitions to support the Japanese war effort in World War II.

== History ==
The Ministry of Munitions was created on 1 November 1943 out of the Board of Planning of the Ministry of Commerce and Industry, which was subsequently abolished. With an increasing portion of Japan's industrial base and infrastructure damaged by Allied air raids, the Japanese government felt it necessary to unify the administration of munitions production to improve efficiency and to increase production levels, particularly that of military aircraft. The concept was inspired by the German Ministry of Armaments and Munitions under Fritz Todt and Albert Speer, which had successfully increased Nazi Germany's industrial production under similar adverse conditions, and was also an unsuccessful political move by the military to impose more control over the zaibatsu.

Although Prime Minister Tōjō concurrently was first Minister of Munitions, the actual day-to-day running of the Ministry devolved to his deputy, Nobusuke Kishi.

Key firms were designated as components of the nationalized Munitions Companies System, and managers were given positions as government officials. Production staff was regarded as conscript labor and was not allowed to quit, or go on strike. State-controlled financial institutions provided working capital and subsidized the firms for any losses.

The Ministry of Munitions was abolished in 1945, by the American occupation authorities, and its functions were absorbed into the modern Ministry of International Trade and Industry (MITI).

== Organization ==
Munitions Minister

- Secretariat
  - General Operations Bureau
  - Aircraft Production Bureau
  - Mechanical Bureau
  - Iron & Steel Bureau
  - Light Metals Bureau
  - Non-Metallic Materials Bureau
  - Chemical Bureau
  - Fuels Bureau
  - Electricity Bureau

== List of ministers ==
| No. | Portrait | Name | Term of office | | Cabinet |
|---|---|---|---|---|---|
| 1 | | Hideki Tōjō 東條 英機 | 1 November 1943 | 22 July 1944 | Tōjō |
| 2 | | Ginjirō Fujiwara 藤原 銀次郎 | 22 July 1944 | 19 December 1944 | Koiso |
| 3 | | Shigeru Yoshida 吉田 茂 | 19 December 1944 | 7 April 1945 | Koiso |
| 4 | | Teijirō Toyoda 豊田 貞次郎 | 7 April 1945 | 17 August 1945 | Suzuki |
| 5 | | Chikuhei Nakajima 中島 知久平 | 17 August 1945 | 26 August 1945 | Higashikuni |
