= Ministry of Commerce and Industry (Japan) =

Former governmental ministry of Japan

The Ministry of Commerce and Industry (商工省, Shōkō-shō) was a cabinet-level ministry in the government of the Empire of Japan from 1925 to 1947. It was created from the Ministry of Agriculture and Commerce (農商務省, Nō-shōmu-shō), and was briefly merged with the Ministry of Agriculture and Forestry (農林省, Nōrin-shō) to reestablish that Ministry during World War II.

== History ==
The original Ministry of Agriculture and Commerce was created on 7 April 1881, initially under the Meiji Daijō-kan Cabinet, and then under the Meiji Constitution. It combined the Bureaus of Agriculture, Forestry, Natural History and post station maintenance which were formerly directly under the Prime Minister with the Bureau of Commerce formerly under the control of the Ministry of Finance.

On 1 April 1925, under Prime Minister Takahashi Korekiyo, the Ministry of Agriculture and Commerce was divided into the Ministry of Agriculture and Forestry, and the Ministry of Commerce and Industry. The division was a result of long-standing acrimony within the ministry between the "commerce" portion of the ministry, which sought expanded overseas trade, and the protectionist "agriculture" portion of the ministry which sought to ban imports of food, especially rice.

In 1934, the Ministry of Commerce and Industry divested itself of the iron and steel industry, leading to the formation of the Nippon Steel Corporation. Following the start of the Second Sino-Japanese War, the Ministry of Commerce and Industry found its role changing from promotion of trade and commerce to enforcing restrictions on trade and management of rationing programs. By the middle of World War II, the Ministry of Munitions, Ministry of Transport and Communications and the Planning Board absorbed most of the functions of the Ministry of Commerce, and the vestigial remains were merged with the Ministry of Agriculture and Forestry to re-establish the Ministry of Agriculture and Commerce on November 1, 1943. The re-formed ministry was also in charge of distribution of rationed goods.

In the post-war period, the Ministry of Commerce and Industry was re-established briefly under the aegis of the Supreme Commander of the Allied Powers, and was assigned control of electrical power production and electrical power distribution. The Ministry of Commerce and Industry became the Ministry of International Trade and Industry, or MITI on May 25, 1949.

== Ministers of Commerce and Industry ==
	Name	Cabinet	From	To
1	Korekiyo Takahashi	Katō	1 April 1924	17 April 1925
2	Noda Utarō	Katō	17 April 1925	2 August 1925
3	Kataoka Naoharu	Katō; 1st Wakatsuki	2 August 1925	14 September 1926
4	Fujisawa Ikunosuke	1st Wakatsuki	14 September 1926	20 April 1927
5	Nakahashi Tokugorō	1st Tanaka	20 April 1927	3 July 1929
6	Tawara Magoichi	Hamaguchi	3 July 1929	14 April 1931
7	Sakurauchi Yukio	2nd Wakatsuki	14 April 1931	13 December 1931
8	Maeda Yonezo	Inukai	13 December 1931	26 May 1932
9	Nakajima Kumakichi	Saitō	26 May 1932	9 February 1933
10	Matsumoto Jōji	Saitō	9 February 1933	8 July 1934
11	Machida Chūji	Okada	8 July 1934	9 March 1936
12	Kawasaki Takukichi	Hirota	9 March 1936	27 March 1936
13	Ogawa Gōtarō	Hirota	27 March 1936	2 February 1937
14	Godō Takuo	Hayashi	2 February 1937	4 June 1937
15	Yoshino Shinji	1st Konoe	4 June 1937	26 May 1938
16	Ikeda Shigeaki	1st Konoe	26 May 1938	5 January 1939
17	Hatta Yoshiaki	Hiranuma	5 January 1939	30 August 1939
18	Godō Takuo	Abe	30 August 1939	16 October 1939
19	Godō Takuo	Abe	16 October 1939	16 January 1940
20	Fujiwara Ginjirō	Yonai	22 January 1940	5 July 1940
21	Kobayashi Ichizō	2nd Konoe	22 July 1940	4 April 1941
22	Toyoda Teijirō	2nd Konoe	4 April 1941	18 July 1941
23	Sakonji Seizō	3rd Konoe	18 July 1941	18 October 1941
24	Kishi Nobusuke	Tōjō	18 October 1941	8 October 1943
25	Tōjō Hideki	Tōjō	8 October 1943	1 November 1943
26	Chikuhei Nakajima	Higashikuni	26 August 1945	9 October 1945
27	Sankurō Ogasawara	Shidehara	9 October 1945	2 May 1946
28	Nirō Hoshijima	1st Yoshida	2 May 1946	31 January 1947
29	Mitsujirō Ishii	1st Yoshida	31 January 1947	26 May 1947
30	Chōsaburō Mizutani	Katayama	26 May 1947	10 March 1948
31	Chōsaburō Mizutani	Ashida	10 March 1948	15 October 1948
32	Sanzō Ōya	2nd Yoshida	15 October 1948	16 February 1949
32	Heitarō Inagaki	2nd Yoshida	16 February 1949	25 May 1949
