= Ikeda Shigeaki =

Japanese businessman and politician

- 池田 成彬
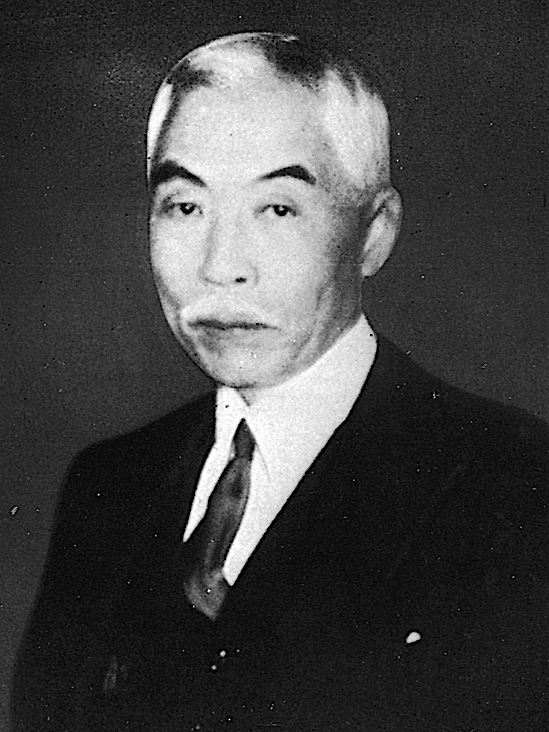
- Ikeda in 1937

Minister of Finance
- In office 26 May 1938 – 5 January 1939
- Prime Minister: Fumimaro Konoe
- Preceded by: Okinori Kaya
- Succeeded by: Sōtarō Ishiwata

Minister of Commerce and Industry
- In office 26 May 1938 – 5 January 1939
- Prime Minister: Fumimaro Konoe
- Preceded by: Shinji Yoshino
- Succeeded by: Yoshiaki Hatta

Governor of the Bank of Japan
- In office 9 February 1937 – 27 July 1937
- Prime Minister: Senjuro Hayashi; Fumimaro Konoe
- Preceded by: Eigo Fukai
- Succeeded by: Toyotarō Yūki

Personal details
- Born: 15 August 1867 Yonezawa Domain, Japan
- Died: 9 October 1950 (aged 83) Oiso, Kanagawa, Japan
- Party: Independent

Ikeda Shigeaki (池田成彬; 15 August 1867 – 9 October 1950), also known as Seihin Ikeda, was a politician, cabinet minister and businessman in the Empire of Japan, prominent in the early decades of the 20th century. He served as director of Mitsui Bank from 1909-1933, was appointed governor of the Bank of Japan in 1937, and served as Minister of Finance under Prime Minister Fumimaro Konoe from 1937 to 1939. In 1941, he was made a member of the Imperial Privy Council; following Japan's defeat in World War II, Ikeda was banned from public political service.

== Background ==
Ikeda was born in 1867, the final year of the Bakumatsu period in Yonezawa Domain (modern Yamagata Prefecture), as the eldest son of noted samurai Ikeda Nariaki. He moved to Tokyo at age 13. His initial efforts to enroll in either Keio University or Tokyo Imperial University failed due to his lack of English language skills; however after 18 months of private tutoring he was able to secure admission into the newly formed Department of Economics at Keio University in 1890. At the recommendation of Harvard professor Arthur Knapp, who was stationed at Keio University, Ikeda was sent to study at Harvard University in the United States from 1890-1895. After graduation, he returned to Japan and obtained a job at the Jiji Shimpo newspaper, but quit after only three weeks.

In December 1895, at the recommendation of director Nakamigawa Hirojirō, Ikeda began working at Mitsui Bank. After being assigned to the Osaka branch, he was made director of the bank's Ashikaga branch, following which he worked on reform proposals for the underwriting of municipal bonds for Osaka, and for deposit agreements between banks. He was then sent back to the United States in 1898 to study banking modernization. After his return in 1900, he rose rapidly through the hierarchy within the Mitsui zaibatsu. In 1904, he married the eldest daughter of managing director Nakamigawa Hirojirō. He helped establish Mitsui Bank as a stock company in 1911, of which he became a director and was appointed managing director in 1919.

After the Showa Financial Crisis of 1927, Ikeda came under criticism when it was discovered that his precipitous withdrawal of funds from the overextended Bank of Taiwan in order to protect Mitsui assets was one of the primary causes for the collapse of the Bank of Taiwan, the second-tier zaibatsu Suzuki Shoten, and the subsequent financial panic.

Ikeda became de facto head of the Mitsui zaibatsu in 1932. He was able to depose the Mitsui family from the senior management of the zaibatsu and from the leadership of key group companies, which he took public by offering stock on the Tokyo Stock Exchange. He was also influential in donations to numerous charity and social projects. Ikeda also implemented a retirement system within Mitsui set at the age of 70, at which point he also retired.

== Public career ==
On his retirement from Mitsui in 1937, Ikeda accepted the position of president of the Bank of Japan. The same year, he was asked to become a Cabinet councilor by Prime Minister Fumimaro Konoe. He was also an advisor to the Ministry of Finance, the North China Development Company and Central China Promotion Company. From 1938-1939, he became both Minister of Finance and Minister of Commerce and Industry.

On 5 December 1938, along with the Prime Minister, Foreign Minister Hachirō Arita, Army Minister Seishirō Itagaki, and Navy Minister Mitsumasa Yonai, Ikeda took part in the Five Ministers' Conference, a secret meeting of the highest officials in the Japanese government, to discuss the government's position on world Jewry. While the Foreign Minister and others were opposed to any formal involvement with the Jewish people, on the basis of their uncontrollable nature and devious schemes as detailed in the Protocols of the Elders of Zion and the threat they posed according to Nazi ideology, Ikeda, along with Army Minister Itagaki, argued that a population of Jews would be a great asset to Japan, attracting foreign capital and improving world opinion towards Japan. The meeting ultimately proved a crucial step in the development of the "Fugu Plan" which would bring several thousand Jews to the Empire of Japan, from Nazi-controlled Europe. Ikeda's name was floated as a possible successor to Konoe as Prime Minister; however, this was strongly opposed by the Imperial Japanese Army, with whom Ikeda had repeatedly clashed over matters of finance. However, he was retained as a Cabinet councilor under Prime Minister Hiranuma Kiichirō, and was also President of the Price Control Board.

Ikeda became a member of the Privy Council in 1941, and was banned from engaging in political activity as a result, following the end of World War II.

== Post-war period ==
In December 1945, following the surrender of Japan, Ikeda was arrested on the orders of the US occupation authorities as a suspect on charges of Class A war crimes. He was released without any charges filed in May 1946; however, as with all members of the wartime Japanese government, he was barred from holding any public office. He withdrew to his summer home in Oiso, Kanagawa, but cooperated with the American occupation officials in the dissolution of the zaibatsu, which earned him the enmity of many former colleagues within the Mitsui group. His close neighbor, Prime Minister Shigeru Yoshida also consulted with Ikeda frequently on matters of finance and personnel. Ikeda died at his home in Oiso in 1950, due to complications arising from intestinal ulcers.

== Notes ==
Political offices
Preceded by Okinori Kaya	Minister of Finance; 1938–1939	Succeeded by Sōtarō Ishiwata
Preceded by Shinji Yoshino	Minister of Commerce and Industry; 1938–1939	Succeeded by Yoshiaki Hatta
Government offices
Preceded by Eigo Fukai	Governor of the Bank of Japan; 1937	Succeeded by Toyotarō Yūki
