= Purge (occupied Japan) =

Prohibition of designated Japanese from public service

Following Japan's defeat in World War II, the Allied Occupation of Japan ordered the purge of tens of thousands of designated persons from public service positions. Individuals targeted in the purge included accused war criminals, military officers, leaders of ultranationalist societies, leaders in the Imperial Rule Assistance Association, business leaders involved in Japanese overseas economic expansion, governors of former Japanese colonies, and national leaders involved in the decisions leading Japan into war. Ultimately, SCAP screened a total of 717,415 individuals, and banned 201,815 of them from holding public office. However, as part of the "Reverse Course" in Occupation policy, most of the purgees would be de-purged and allowed to return to public life by 1951.

This purge of conservative elements during the Occupation is sometimes retroactively referred to as the "White Purge" to distinguish it from a similar "Red Purge" of communists and leftists.

== General descriptions ==
Edict No. 109 was issued in the name of the Japanese emperor prohibiting POWs, cooperators of World War II, those belonging to Dai Nippon Butoku Kai, Taisei Yokusankai and Gokokudoshikai from engaging in public service in 1946. In 1947, the range of prohibited positions widened, including private enterprises. More than 20,000 people were purged. A purge qualification committee was established to address objections between March 1947 and March 1948 and restarting in February 1949. The law was abolished by law No.94 in 1952 after the Allied occupation came to an end. In 1948, 148 people including politician Wataru Narahashi and Shigeru Hori were denied exoneration and four people including Takeru Inukai obtained release from the purge.

== Effects of the purge ==
Leading political figures disappeared and the next generation gained power. The purge of government officials, including judges and those belonging to Tokubetsu Kōtō Keisatsu, was less strict; the latter went to other posts. Eighty percent of the members of the House of Representatives were purged, but members of their families ran for election, preserving their seats.

== End of the purge ==
The policies of the Occupation authorities began to change with the cancellation of an intended February 1, 1947 general strike, which marked the start of the "Reverse Course" in Occupation policy, as goals shifted from demilitarizing and democratizing Japan to remilitarizing and strengthening Japan's economy. Fears of communist elements in Japan began to grow with the heightening of global Cold War tensions, and reached a peak in 1950 after the outbreak of the Korean War. The Occupation began to shift its attention from purging conservative elements to purging communists and leftists, not only from public service but also from the private and education sectors, in a new purge known as the "Red Purge."

In 1950, individuals purged earlier in the occupation began to be depurged, including some former military officers and conservative politicians. In May 1951, General Matthew Ridgway stated that the purge would be generally softened and authority would be transferred to the Japanese government. In 1951, nearly 200,000 people were depurged. At the end, Nobusuke Kishi and another 5,500 people remained purged.

== Politicians who were purged ==
- Bin Akao was an extreme-right Japanese politician.
- Shigeaki Ikeda also known as Seihin Ikeda, was a Japanese politician and businessman. He served as director of Mitsui Bank from 1909-1933, was appointed governor of the Bank of Japan in 1937, and served as Minister of Finance under Prime Minister Fumimaro Konoe from 1937 to 1939.
- Tanzan Ishibashi was a Japanese journalist and politician.
- Kanji Ishiwara was a general in the Imperial Japanese Army in World War II.
- Fusae Ichikawa was a Japanese feminist, politician and women's suffrage leader.
- Taketora Ogata was a Japanese journalist, Vice President of Asahi Shimbun newspaper and later a politician.
- Masatsune Ogura was a Japanese politician and business man.
- Keizō Shibusawa was a Japanese businessman, central banker and philanthropist. He was the 16th Governor of the Bank of Japan.
- Shigeyo Takeuchi was a Japanese physician, politician, and feminist
- Ichirō Hatoyama was a Japanese politician and the 52nd, 53rd and 54th Prime Minister of Japan.
- Prince Naruhiko Higashikuni was the 43rd Prime Minister of Japan from 17 August 1945 to 9 October 1945.
- Jiichirō Matsumoto was a famous Japanese politician and businessman. He was leader of burakumin liberation movement from the early beginning of it and was called "buraku liberation father" in Buraku Liberation League.

== Businessmen who were purged ==
- Namihei Odaira was a Japanese entrepreneur and philanthropist who founded what is now known as Hitachi Ltd.
- Ichizō Kobayashi, occasionally referred to by his pseudonym Itsuo, was a Japanese industrialist. He is best known as the founder of Hankyu Railway and Takarazuka Revue.
- Keita Gotō was a Japanese businessman who built the Tokyu Group into one of the leading corporate groups in Japan.
- Yasujirō Tsutsumi was a Japanese entrepreneur, politician, and business tycoon who founded a dynasty which became the wealthiest, most influential family of 20th century Japan.
- Kōnosuke Matsushita was a Japanese industrialist, the founder of Panasonic.
- Masatoshi Ōkōchi was a Japanese businessman, the third director of RIKEN.
- Masaichi Nagata was a Japanese businessman, the president of Daiei Film.

== Others ==
- Shigeyoshi Matsumae was a Japanese electrical engineer, inventor of the non-loaded cable carrier system, the top of the Ministry of Communications (Teishin-in, between August 30, 1945 and April 8, 1946), politician and the founder of Tokai University. Matsumae was involved in Taisei Yokusankai and was the head of the Ministry of Communications. The border of the latter was the date of signing of surrender.
- Kan Kikuchi also known as Hiroshi Kikuchi, was a Japanese author who established the publishing company Bungeishunju, the monthly magazine of the same name, the Japan Writer's Association and both the Akutagawa and Naoki Prize for popular literature. He was also the head of Daiei Motion Picture Company (currently Kadokawa Pictures).
- Matsutarō Shōriki was a "Class A" war criminal after the Second World War. He is also known as the father of Japanese professional baseball. He was a media mogul, owned the Yomiuri Shimbun, one of Japan's major daily newspapers, and founded Japan's first commercial television station, Nippon Television Network Corporation. He was also elected to the House of Representatives, appointed to the House of Peers and was one of the most successful judo masters.
- Tokutomi Sohō was the pen-name of a journalist and historian active from late Meiji period through mid-Showa period Japan. His real name was Tokutomi Iichiro.
- Tetsuzō Iwamoto was one of the top scoring fighter aces of the Empire of Japan, during World War II.
- Eiji Tsuburaya was the Japanese special effects director responsible for many Japanese science fiction movies, including the Godzilla series. In the United States, he is also remembered as the creator of Ultraman.
- Masahiro Yasuoka was a Japanese scholar of yangmingism who, through his philosophy, reportedly influenced many Japanese politicians, including postwar prime ministers of Japan. He has been considered to be a backroom power broker or eminence grise.
- Dairoku Harada was a Japanese archaeologist and studied in the Fukuoka area. He was drafted into the Army and was sent to China.
- Nisshō Inoue was a radical Buddhist preacher of Nichirenism who founded the interwar Japanese far-right militant organization Ketsumeidan (血盟団, League of Blood).
