= Keita Gotō (industrialist) =

Japanese businessman and politician (1882–1959)

- 五島 慶太
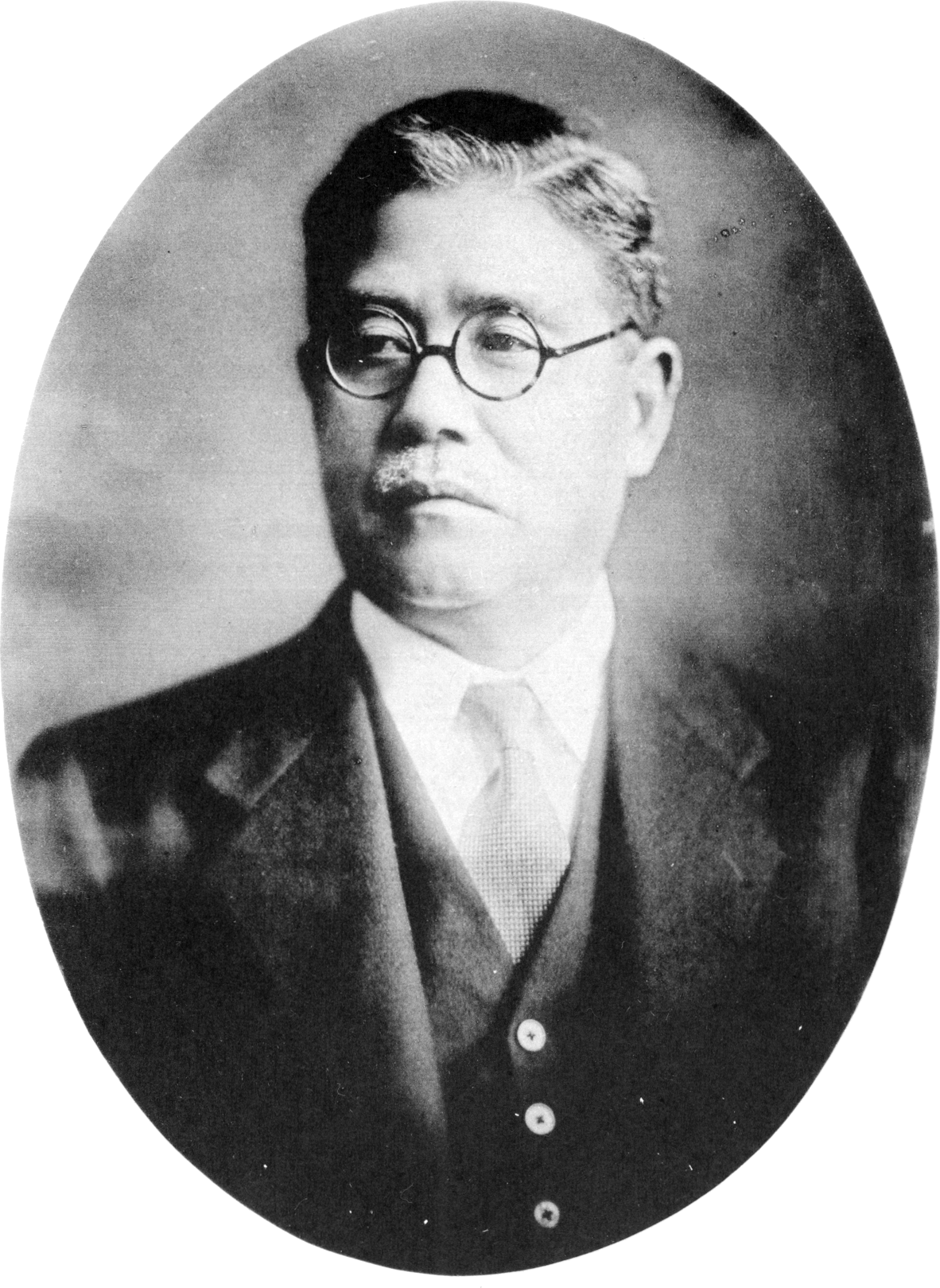

Minister of Transportation and Communications
- In office 19 February 1944 – 22 July 1944
- Prime Minister: Hideki Tojo
- Preceded by: Yoshiaki Hatta
- Succeeded by: Yonezō Maeda

Personal details
- Born: 18 April 1882 Tonoto, Chiisagata, Nagano Prefecture, Empire of Japan
- Died: 14 August 1959 (aged 77)
- Party: Independent
- Spouse: Kume Machiyo (m. 1912)
- Education: Tokyo Imperial University

Keita Gotō (五島 慶太, Gotō Keita; 18 April 1882 – 14 August 1959) was a Japanese businessman, politician and educator, who built the Tokyu Group into one of the leading corporate groups in Japan. He briefly served as Minister of Transportation and Communications in 1944. Prior to his business career, he worked as a government official in the Ministry of Agriculture and the Ministry of Transport. He founded the Tōyoko Commercial Girls' School and the Gotō Ikueikai. He is also the founder of Toei.

== Biography ==
=== Early life and career ===
Gotō was born as Keita Kobayashi on 18 April 1882, in the village of Tonodo in Chiisagata, Nagano Prefecture (present-day Tonodo, Aoki, Nagano Prefecture), the second son of Kobayashi Kikuemon and his wife Toshie. He attended Aoki Normal Elementary School and Urazato Upper Elementary School.

After graduating from Matsumoto High School, he worked as a substitute teacher at Aoki Elementary School through the recommendation of his former teacher Kobayashi Naojirō. In 1902, he entered Tokyo Higher Normal School, what is now the University of Tsukuba. After graduating, he briefly worked as an English teacher at Mie Prefectural Yokkaichi Commercial School in 1906. In 1907, he entered the law department of the Tokyo Imperial University. After graduating, he entered the Ministry of Agriculture, beginning a career as a government official in 1911, at the relatively late age of 29. Three years later he transferred to the Ministry of Transport, where he was involved in supervising the national railway system.

In 1912, while still working in the Ministry of Agriculture, he married Kume Machiyo, the eldest daughter of the engineer Kume Taminosuke who designed the Nijūbashi Bridge. He became the heir to the Gotō family, a former samurai family of the Numata Domain related to the Kume family, at the request of her family, and subsequently assumed the family name Gotō.

=== Business career ===
In 1920, Gotō was offered the post of Director of the Musashi Railway, a struggling company in need of capital to finance its expansion. He accepted and resigned from his post in the ministry the same year. In 1922, he founded the Meguro Kamata Electric Railway, at the age of 40.

By 1924, he had acquired a controlling interest in the Musashi Railway, using the profits from other railway ventures in the Tokyo area. This was the first of many acquisitions in which Gotō bought weak companies and transformed them into profitable members of a growing railway and real estate group. It was also around this time that he persuaded the Tokyo Institute of Technology to relocate along his railway from its former campus, which had been damaged in the 1923 Great Kantō earthquake. Over the next 10 years, this was followed by relocation assistance to several other schools and universities, including the Nippon Medical School and the high school of Tokyo Gakugei University. Together with numerous new residential developments along the railways, this strategy brought steady passengers and increased the value of the company's real estate holdings.

Gotō became president of the Tokyu Railways in 1942.

In 1944, he was appointed Minister of Transportation and Communications, and stepped down from his position in the Tokyu Railway. After the end of the World War II, he was banned from public office by the GHQ (Supreme Commander for the Allied Powers).

He founded the Tōyoko Commercial Girls' School in 1939, beginning his endeavors in the education business. He became chairman of the Tokyu Railway in 1952. He founded the educational institution Gotō Ikueikai in 1955.

Gotō died on 14 August 1959, aged 77. By the time of his death, his strategy of aggressive acquisitions had built the Tokyu Group into one of Japan's largest corporate empires, with businesses ranging from railways and department stores to hospitals, schools, and leisure and entertainment companies.

== Gotoh Educational Corporation ==
The Gotoh Educational Corporation which Gotō established and served as the first Director-General continues his philanthropic legacy managing eight private educational schools including Tokyo City University. The Tokyo City University and affiliated schools currently serve the educational needs of over 12,000 students.

== Art collection ==
In his later years, Gotō was a noted collector of Japanese and Asian art. His collection included several National Treasures, including calligraphy, ceramics, and one of the four surviving 13th-century Tale of Genji illustrated handscrolls. The collection is now preserved in the Gotoh Museum in Tokyo.
