= Kuniaki Koiso =

Japanese general, prime minister from 1944 to 1945

Junior Second Rank Kuniaki Koiso
- 小磯 國昭
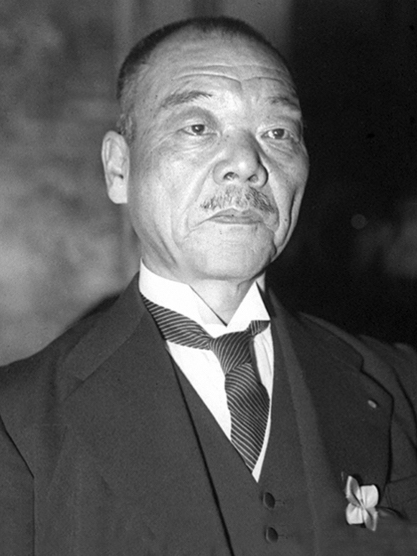
- Koiso c. 1940s

Prime Minister of Japan
- In office 22 July 1944 – 7 April 1945
- Monarch: Hirohito
- Preceded by: Hideki Tojo
- Succeeded by: Kantarō Suzuki

President of the Imperial Rule Assistance Association
- In office 22 July 1944 – 7 April 1945
- Deputy: Taketora Ogata
- Preceded by: Hideki Tojo
- Succeeded by: Kantarō Suzuki

Governor-General of Korea
- In office 15 June 1942 – 22 July 1944
- Monarch: Hirohito
- Preceded by: Jirō Minami
- Succeeded by: Nobuyuki Abe

Minister of Colonial Affairs
- In office 16 January 1940 – 22 July 1940
- Prime Minister: Mitsumasa Yonai
- Preceded by: Tsuneo Kanemitsu
- Succeeded by: Yōsuke Matsuoka
- In office 7 April 1939 – 30 August 1939
- Prime Minister: Kiichirō Hiranuma
- Preceded by: Yoshiaki Hatta
- Succeeded by: Tsuneo Kanemitsu

Personal details
- Born: 22 March 1880 Utsunomiya, Tochigi, Japan
- Died: 3 November 1950 (aged 70) Sugamo Prison, Tokyo, Japan
- Resting place: Aoyama Cemetery
- Party: Imperial Rule Assistance Association (1940–1945)
- Other political affiliations: Sakurakai
- Spouse: Kaoriko Koiso (m. 1907; died 1950)
- Education: Imperial Japanese Army Academy; Army War College
- Profession: Soldier
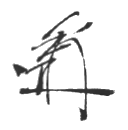
- Signature

Military service
- Allegiance: Japan
- Branch/service: Imperial Japanese Army
- Years of service: 1900–1938
- Rank: General
- Commands: Japanese Korean Army; Volunteer Fighting Corps

Kuniaki Koiso (小磯 國昭, Koiso Kuniaki; 22 March 1880 – 3 November 1950) was a Japanese politician and general who served as prime minister of Japan from 1944 to 1945, during World War II. He previously served as minister of colonial affairs in 1939 and 1940, and as governor-general of Korea from 1942 to 1944. Koiso resigned as premier after the start of the Battle of Okinawa, and following Japan's surrender he was convicted as a Class A war criminal and sentenced to life imprisonment, dying in prison in 1950.

== Early life ==
Koiso was born on March 22, 1880, in Utsunomiya, Tochigi Prefecture, the first son of chief inspector of police and shizoku (former samurai) Koiso Susumu. He attended eight different schools, graduating from Yamagata Middle School (today Yamagata Prefectural Yamagata East High School). He was accepted as an officer candidate in 1898.

== Military career ==
Koiso graduated from the Imperial Japanese Army Academy in 1900 and went on to attend the Army Staff College. Commissioned a 2nd Lieutenant in the 30th Infantry Regiment in June 1901, he was promoted to Lieutenant in November 1903. During the Russo-Japanese War, he served as Battalion Adjutant in September 1904, Company Commander in March 1905 and was promoted to captain in June 1905.

In November 1910, Koiso graduated from the Army Staff College, 33rd in a class of 55, and returned to the Imperial Japanese Army Academy as an instructor in December 1910.

Reassigned to the Kwantung Army General Staff in September 1912, Koiso was promoted to major and Battalion Commander of the 2d Infantry Regiment in August 1914. He returned to the Imperial Japanese Army General Staff Headquarters in June 1915, was promoted to lieutenant colonel in July 1918, and seconded to the Imperial Japanese Army Air Service in July 1921. After his promotion to colonel in February 1922, he was sent as a military attaché to Europe in June 1922, returning to assume command of the IJA 51st Division in August 1923. Returning to the Army General Staff in May 1925, he was promoted to major general in December 1926 and lieutenant general in August 1931.

In February 1932, Koiso became Vice-Minister of War and in August 1932, concurrently Chief of Staff of the Kwantung Army. In March 1934, he was transferred to command the IJA 5th Division (Hiroshima). He then assumed command of the Chōsen Army in Korea from December 1935. Promoted to full general in November 1937, he joined the Army General Staff in July 1938.

== Colonial affairs and Korea ==
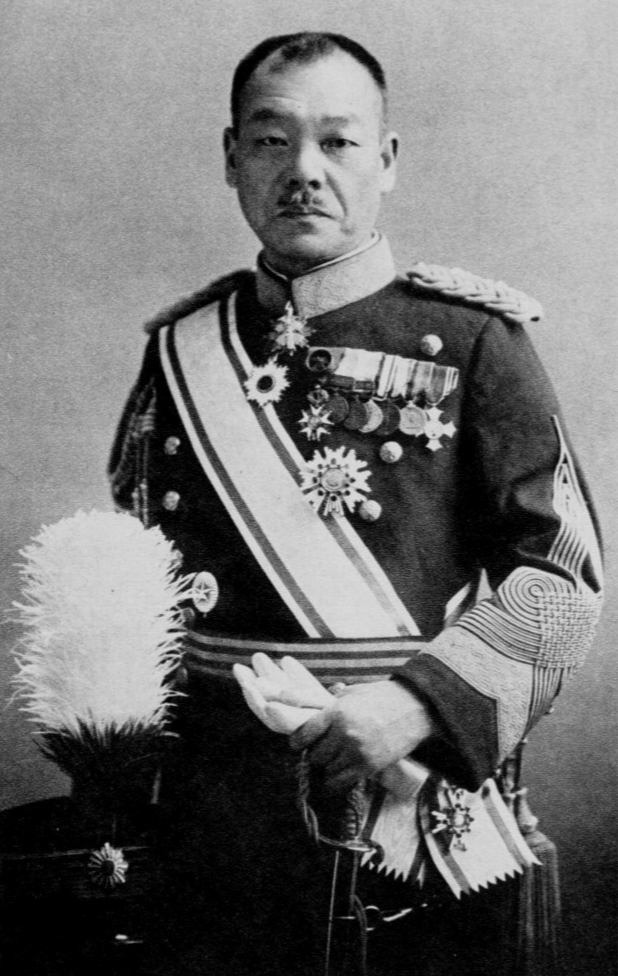
Kuniaki Koiso as the Governor General of Korea

Koiso left active duty in July 1938. From April to August 1939, he served in the cabinet of Prime Minister Hiranuma Kiichirō as Minister of Colonial Affairs. He returned to the same post again from January to July 1940 under the Yonai administration.

Koiso was appointed Governor-General of Korea, succeeding Jirō Minami, from May 1942 to 1944, during which time he gained the nickname "The Tiger of Korea" for his looks rather than his military prowess. Koiso continued his predecessor's hardline policies, such as imposing the highly unpopular universal military conscription on Koreans, which forced them to fight for the Japanese, on August 1, 1943.

When news of Korean independence reached him after the war, Koiso scoffed "the dream of Korean independence is as foolish as trying to plot the independence of Kyushu or Hokkaido."

== Premiership (1944–1945) ==
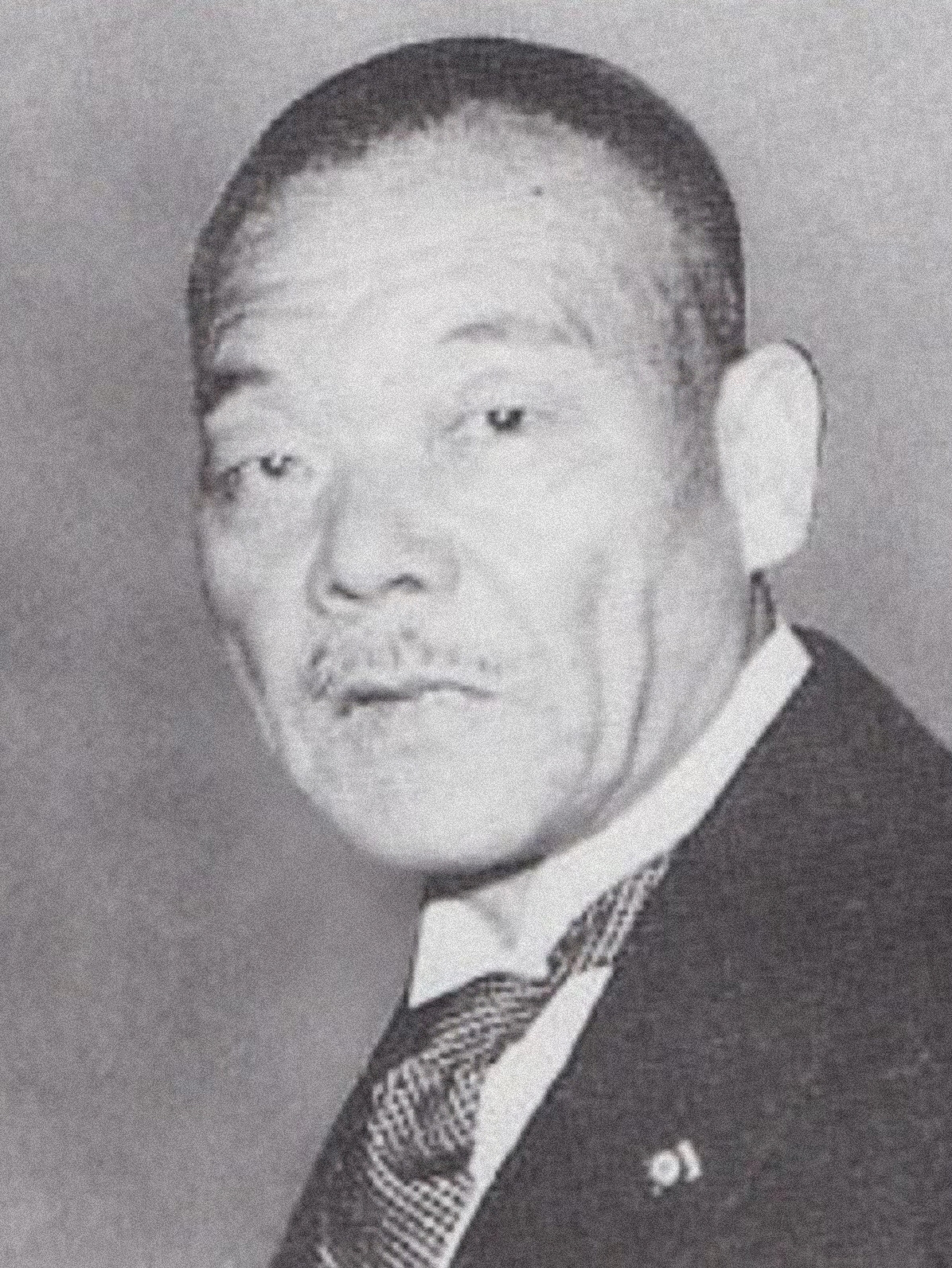
- Premiership of Kuniaki Koiso; 22 July 1944 – 7 April 1945
- Monarch: Emperor Shōwa
- Cabinet: Koiso Cabinet
- Party: Imperial Rule Assistance Association
- Seat: Naikaku Sōri Daijin Kantei
- Emblem of the Government of Japan

After the Allied landing in Normandy (June 6) and the successful capture of Saipan (9 July), Hideki Tojo resigned and a new cabinet was formed. In selecting a new prime minister, the elder statesmen narrowed the candidates down to three: Hisaichi Terauchi (commander of the Southern Expeditionary Army Group), Shunroku Hata (commander of the China Expeditionary Army), and Koiso.

The Army strongly favored General Hisaichi Terauchi; however, they could not afford to recall him to Japan from his role as commander-in-chief of all Japanese forces in Southeast Asia. The civilian government, especially Lord Keeper of the Privy Seal Kōichi Kido and former prime minister Fumimaro Konoe, also did not favor Koiso, due to Koiso's previous involvement with the ultranationalist Sakura Kai and its attempted coup d'état against the government in 1931 (i.e. the "March Incident"). These reservations were shared by the Emperor in his Privy Council meetings. Koiso was supported by two former prime ministers, Mitsumasa Yonai and Hiranuma Kiichirō, and as no consensus could be reached on a more suitable alternative, their arguments prevailed. Moreover, Mitsumasa Yonai was appointed vice-prime minister as a way of dealing with strong objections to Koiso.

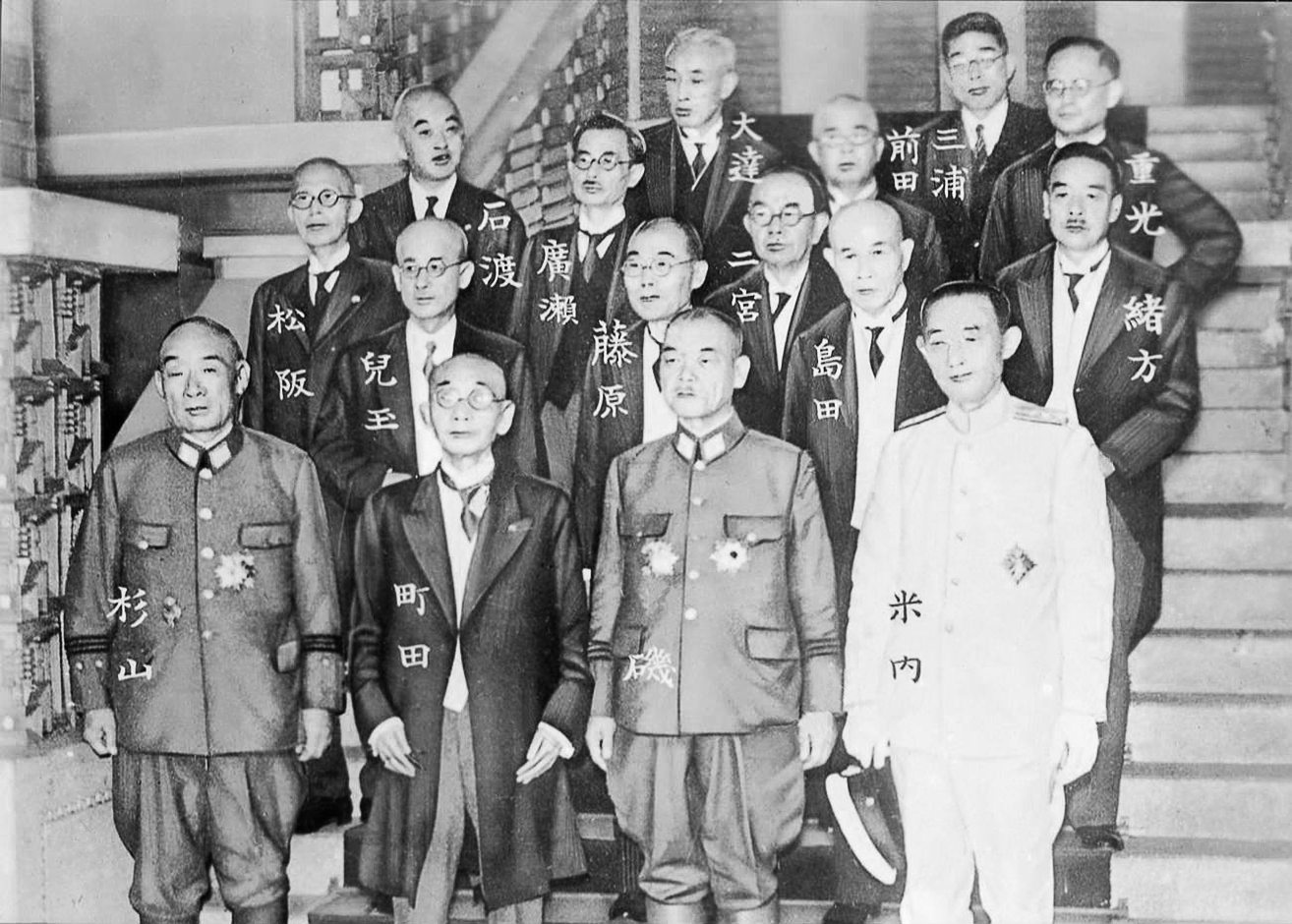
Kuniaki Koiso (third from left on front row) with his cabinet after being named prime minister

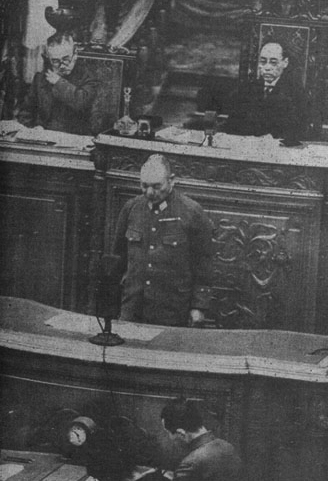
Koiso giving his administrative policy speech at the 86th Imperial Diet in January 1945.

Koiso attempted to end army-navy rivalry by creating a Supreme Chief of Staff (最高幕僚長), but this was structured to favor the army, thus bitter opposition from the navy doomed the plan. Instead, a Supreme War Guidance Council (最高戦争指導会議) was created (August 4, 1944 – August 22, 1945). Koiso was not taken seriously at Council meetings, where he was openly contradicted by Hata Hikosaburo. Within the top levels of the Imperial Army, rumors circulated that the Koiso Cabinet would only last two months (it lasted nine months).

Koiso's strategy for ending the war was to strike a hard blow against the American Army in the Philippines, forcing negotiations. However, the general entrusted with the defense of the Philippines, Tomoyuki Yamashita, disagreed with the planners in the Southern Expeditionary Army. As such, the Army and Navy could not agree on a coordinated plan. Nevertheless, the defenders were prepared to make considerable sacrifices when Douglas MacArthur invaded Leyte on October 17, with the first kamikaze attack carried out on October 21, and the Japanese Navy losing four aircraft carriers and three battleships during the Battle of Leyte Gulf. Although the strategy had failed, Koiso did not change his way of thinking. Late in 1944, Koiso still planned to send Prince Fumimaro Konoe on a peace mission to neutral countries, Switzerland and Sweden, but it came to nothing.

During the remainder of Koiso's premiership in office, Japanese forces continued to suffer a string of defeats on all fronts at the hands of the Allies. Also during his premiership, on 10 November 1944, Wang Jingwei died of pneumonia in a Japanese hospital in Nagoya, which effectively was the end of the Reorganized National Government of China in northern China. For a time, Koiso considered making peace, but he could not find a solution that would appease both the Japanese military and the Allies. Left with little choice but to continue the war effort, Koiso tried to extend his power over the army by attempting to assume the position of War Minister concurrently with that of Prime Minister, but was unable to legally do so as he was on the reserve list. Koiso resigned in April 1945 when American forces invaded Okinawa and his demands to be included in military decisions were rejected, the same date the Imperial Japanese Navy flagship Yamato was sunk by American aircraft during Operation Ten-Go.

== Later career ==
Koiso was an ardent supporter of State Shinto along with Heisuke Yanagawa, who directed the Government Imperial Aid Association. He restored the ancient sacred rites in the Sukumo river, near Hakone, the "Preliminary Misogi Rite".

After the end of World War II, Koiso was arrested by the Allied occupation powers and tried by the International Military Tribunal for the Far East for war crimes. Upon conviction as a Class-A war criminal on counts 1, 27, 29, 31, 32 and 55, he was given a sentence of life imprisonment. The Tribunal specifically cited Koiso's decisive role in starting the wars against China and the Allies. "Furthermore, despite the fact that Kuniaki Koiso was not directly responsible for the war crimes committed by the Japanese Army, he took no measures to prevent them or to punish the perpetrators when, as Prime Minister, it was within his power to do so." Koiso died of esophageal cancer in Sugamo Prison in 1950. His grave is at the Aoyama Cemetery in central Tokyo.

== Honors ==
From the corresponding article in the Japanese Wikipedia

- Grand Cordon of the Order of the Rising Sun (April 5, 1934)
- Grand Cordon of the Order of the Sacred Treasure (April 29, 1934)
- Order of the Golden Kite, 2nd class (April 29, 1934)

Political offices
Preceded by Yoshiaki Hatta	Minister of Colonial Affairs; 1939	Succeeded by Tsuneo Kanemitsu
Preceded by Tsuneo Kanemitsu	Minister of Colonial Affairs; 1940	Succeeded by Yōsuke Matsuoka
Preceded by Jirō Minami	Governor General of Korea; 1942–1944	Succeeded by Nobuyuki Abe
Preceded by Hideki Tōjō	Prime Minister of Japan; 1944–1945	Succeeded by Kantarō Suzuki
