= Konoe Cabinet =

Konoe Cabinet may refer to:

- First Konoe Cabinet, the Japanese government led by Fumimaro Konoe from 1937 to 1939
- Second Konoe Cabinet, the Japanese government led by Fumimaro Konoe from 1940 to 1941
- Third Konoe Cabinet, the Japanese government led by Fumimaro Konoe in 1941
