= Hiranuma cabinet =

Cabinet of Japan (January 5 - August 30, 1939)

Hiranuma Cabinet
- 35th Cabinet of Japan

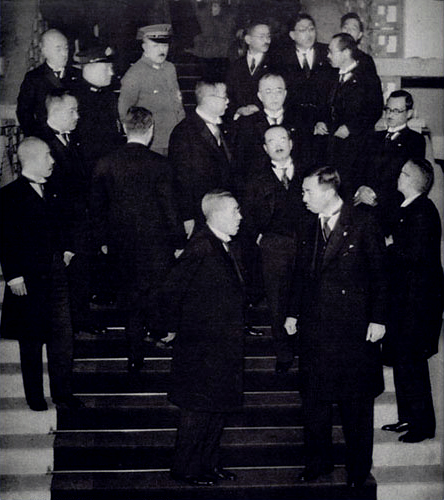
- Date formed: January 5, 1939
- Date dissolved: August 30, 1939

People and organisations
- Emperor: Shōwa
- Prime Minister: Hiranuma Kiichirō
- Status in legislature: Majority (coalition)

History
- Legislature term: 74th Imperial Diet
- Predecessor: First Konoe Cabinet
- Successor: Nobuyuki Abe Cabinet

The Hiranuma Cabinet is the 35th Cabinet of Japan led by Hiranuma Kiichirō from January 5, 1939, to August 30, 1939. The cabinet had to contend and enforce the mobilization of Japan's economic resources for total war started under his predecessor, Fumimaro Konoe who passed the State General Mobilization Law.

The Hiranuma Cabinet was formed as a result of the collapse of Konoe's first premiership, who had resigned over his failure to negotiate an end to the Second Sino-Japanese War after breaking off relations with the Nationalist government.

== Cabinet ==
Ministers
Portfolio	Name	Political party	Term start	Term end
Prime Minister	Baron Kiichirō Hiranuma	Independent	January 5, 1939	August 30, 1939
Minister for Foreign Affairs	Hachirō Arita	Independent	January 5, 1939	August 30, 1939
Minister of Home Affairs	Marquess Kōichi Kido	Independent	January 5, 1939	August 30, 1939
Minister of Finance	Sōtarō Ishiwata	Independent	January 5, 1939	August 30, 1939
Minister of the Army	Seishirō Itagaki	Military (Army)	January 5, 1939	August 30, 1939
Minister of the Navy	Mitsumasa Yonai	Military (Navy)	January 5, 1939	August 30, 1939
Minister of Justice	Suehiko Shiono	Independent	January 5, 1939	August 30, 1939
Minister of Education	Baron Sadao Araki	Military (Army)	January 5, 1939	August 30, 1939
Minister of Agriculture, Forestry and Fisheries	Yukio Sakurauchi	Rikken Minseitō	January 5, 1939	August 30, 1939
Minister of Commerce and Industry	Yoshiaki Hatta	Independent	January 5, 1939	August 30, 1939
Minister of Communications	Suehiko Shiono	Independent	January 5, 1939	April 7, 1939
Minister of Communications	Harumichi Tanabe	Independent	April 7, 1939	August 30, 1939
Minister of Railways	Yonezō Maeda	Rikken Seiyūkai	January 5, 1939	August 30, 1939
Minister of Colonial Affairs	Yoshiaki Hatta	Independent	January 5, 1939	April 7, 1939
Minister of Colonial Affairs	Kuniaki Koiso	Military (Army)	April 7, 1939	August 30, 1939
Minister of Health	Hisatada Hirose	Independent	January 5, 1939	August 30, 1939
Minister without portfolio	Prince Fumimaro Konoe	Independent	January 5, 1939	August 30, 1939
Chief Cabinet Secretary	Harumichi Tanabe	Independent	January 5, 1939	April 7, 1939
Chief Cabinet Secretary	Kōzō Ōta	Independent	April 7, 1939	August 30, 1939
Director-General of the Cabinet Legislation Bureau	Teizō Kurosaki	Independent	January 5, 1939	August 30, 1939
Parliamentary Vice-Ministers
Portfolio	Name	Political party	Term start	Term end
Parliamentary Vice-Minister for Foreign Affairs	Shimizu Tomesaburō	Rikken Minseitō	January 19, 1939	August 30, 1939
Parliamentary Vice-Minister of Home Affairs	Kanna Kenwa	Rikken Minseitō	January 19, 1939	August 30, 1939
Parliamentary Vice-Minister of Finance	Matsumura Kōzō	Rikken Seiyūkai	January 19, 1939	August 30, 1939
Parliamentary Vice-Minister of the Army	Nishimura Shigeo	Rikken Seiyūkai	January 19, 1939	August 30, 1939
Parliamentary Vice-Minister of the Navy	Takechiyo Matsuda	Rikken Minseitō	January 19, 1939	August 30, 1939
Parliamentary Vice-Minister of Justice	Kuramoto Yōichi	Rikken Seiyūkai	January 19, 1939	August 30, 1939
Parliamentary Vice-Minister of Education	Koyanagi Makie	Rikken Minseitō	January 19, 1939	August 30, 1939
Parliamentary Vice-Minister of Agriculture, Forestry and Fisheries	Kenzō Matsumura	Rikken Minseitō	January 19, 1939	August 30, 1939
Parliamentary Vice-Minister of Commerce and Industry	Imai Takehiko	Rikken Seiyūkai	January 19, 1939	August 30, 1939
Parliamentary Vice-Minister of Communications	Hirakawa Matsutarō	Rikken Minseitō	January 19, 1939	August 30, 1939
Parliamentary Vice-Minister of Railways	Kudō Tosao	Rikken Seiyūkai	January 19, 1939	August 30, 1939
Parliamentary Vice-Minister of Colonial Affairs	Terada Ichimasa	Rikken Seiyūkai	January 19, 1939	August 30, 1939
Parliamentary Vice-Minister of Health	Tsuzaki Naotake	Rikken Seiyūkai	January 19, 1939	August 30, 1939
Parliamentary Undersecretaries
Portfolio	Name	Political party	Term start	Term end
Parliamentary Undersecretary for Foreign Affairs	Hashimoto Takichi	Rikken Seiyūkai	January 19, 1939	August 30, 1939
Parliamentary Undersecretary of Home Affairs	Nakai Kazuo	Rikken Seiyūkai	January 19, 1939	August 30, 1939
Parliamentary Undersecretary of Finance	Yano Shōtarō	Rikken Minseitō	January 19, 1939	August 30, 1939
Parliamentary Undersecretary of the Army	Nakaigawa Hiroshi	Rikken Minseitō	January 19, 1939	August 30, 1939
Parliamentary Undersecretary of the Navy	Nakahara Kinji	Rikken Minseitō	January 19, 1939	August 30, 1939
Parliamentary Undersecretary of Justice	Hamano Tetsutarō	Rikken Minseitō	January 19, 1939	August 30, 1939
Parliamentary Undersecretary of Education	Nonaka Tetsuya	Kokumin Dōmei	January 19, 1939	August 30, 1939
Parliamentary Undersecretary of Agriculture, Forestry and Fisheries	Jōji Hayashi	Rikken Seiyūkai	January 19, 1939	August 30, 1939
Parliamentary Undersecretary of Commerce and Industry	Sawada Rikichi	Rikken Minseitō	January 19, 1939	August 30, 1939
Parliamentary Undersecretary of Communications	Ueda Kōkichi	Rikken Seiyūkai	January 19, 1939	August 30, 1939
Parliamentary Undersecretary of Railways	Aoki Ryōkan	Rikken Minseitō	January 19, 1939	August 30, 1939
Parliamentary Undersecretary of Colonial Affairs	Etō Genkurō	Nippon Kakushintō (Note: lit. 'Reformist Party of Japan', party formed by three far-right reformist deputies elected by the coalition Seiji Kakushin Kyōgikai (lit. 'Agreement for Political Reform'), namely, Etō Genkurō, Akamatsu Katsumaro and Koike Shirō. Etō had to resign from his party leadership position because his party expressed opposition to Hiranuma.)	January 19, 1939	August 30, 1939
Parliamentary Undersecretary of Health	Kentarō Ayabe	Rikken Seiyūkai	January 19, 1939	August 30, 1939
