= Harumichi Tanabe =

Japanese bureaucrat and politician (1879–1950)

- 田辺 治通
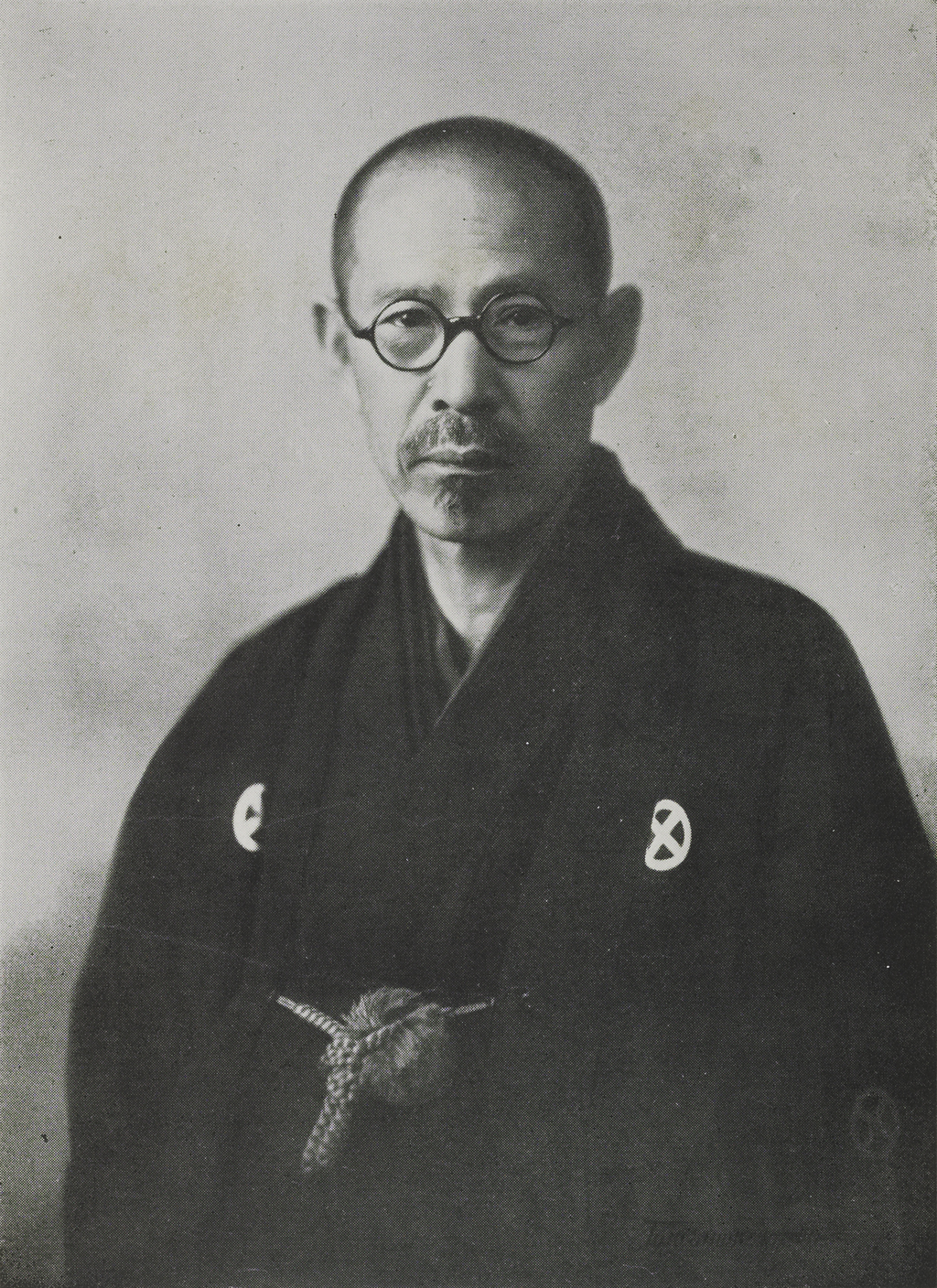
- Tanabe c. 1953

Minister of Home Affairs
- In office 18 July 1941 – 18 October 1941
- Prime Minister: Fumimaro Konoe
- Preceded by: Hiranuma Kiichirō
- Succeeded by: Hideki Tojo

Minister of Communications
- In office 7 April 1939 – 30 August 1939
- Prime Minister: Hiranuma Kiichirō
- Preceded by: Suehiko Shiono
- Succeeded by: Ryūtarō Nagai

Chief Cabinet Secretary
- In office 5 January 1939 – 7 April 1939
- Prime Minister: Hiranuma Kiichirō
- Preceded by: Akira Kazami
- Succeeded by: Kōzō Ōta

Member of the House of Peers
- In office 16 July 1940 – 13 March 1946 Nominated by the Emperor

Governor of Osaka Prefecture
- In office 17 May 1927 – 25 May 1928
- Monarch: Hirohito
- Preceded by: Nozomu Nakagawa
- Succeeded by: Yūichirō Chikaraishi

Personal details
- Born: 17 October 1879 Kōshū, Yamanashi, Japan
- Died: 30 January 1950 (aged 70)
- Party: Independent
- Education: Tokyo Imperial University
- Occupation: Bureaucrat, politician

Harumichi Tanabe (田辺 治通, Tanabe Harumichi; 17 October 1879 – 30 January 1950) was a Japanese bureaucrat and politician in the early Shōwa period.

== Biography ==
Tanabe was born in what is now Kōshū, Yamanashi as the younger son of a local sake brewer. He graduated from the law school of Tokyo Imperial University in 1905 and received a posting to the Ministry of Communications. He was subsequently sent to France for studies, and returned as an expert in wireless communications. Tanabe rose through the ranks within the ministry, becoming Bureau Chief in 1924.

Tanabe was drawn into politics over the debate for constitutional revision at the time of the Kiyoura Cabinet, and denounced the privileged position of the bureaucracy. He resigned from his post at the time of the Katō Takaaki Cabinet.

However, conservative Minister of Justice and President of the House of Peers, Kiichirō Hiranuma thought very highly of Tanabe, and invited him to accept a position on the board of his Kokuhonsha, a nationalist political group founded in 1924. Tanabe became Hiranuma's protégé and assistant. In 1927, he was appointed Governor of Osaka by Home Minister Suzuki Kisaburō, another Hiranuma protégé and Kokuhonsha member. However, he was forced to resign after a year when Suzuki was indicted on suspicion of electoral irregularities.

In 1933, Tanabe relocated to Manchukuo, where he served as vice president to the Privy Council of the Emperor of Manchukuo. He supported the viewpoint of the Kwantung Army that private management of industries was more realistic than a completely state-controlled economy. He was recalled to Japan with the formation of the Hiranuma Cabinet, and after serving for a brief period as Chief Cabinet Secretary from January to April 1939, he was appointed Minister of Communications, serving in that post from April through the end of August 1939.

In 1938, Tanabe was appointed to a seat in the House of Peers. In 1941, he succeeded his mentor Hiranuma in the post of Home Minister in the Third Konoe Cabinet for a period of three months.

After World War II, Tanabe was purged by the American occupation authorities. He died of illness in 1950.

Political offices
Preceded by Akira Kazami	Chief Cabinet Secretary; 5 January 1939 – 7 April 1939	Succeeded by Kōzō Ōta
Preceded by Suehiko Shiono	Minister of Communications; 7 April 1939 – 30 August 1939	Succeeded by Ryūtarō Nagai
Preceded by Kiichirō Hiranuma	Home Minister; 18 July 1941 – 18 October 1941	Succeeded by Hideki Tojo
