= Suehiko Shiono =

Japanese lawyer and politician (1880–1949)

- 塩野 季彦
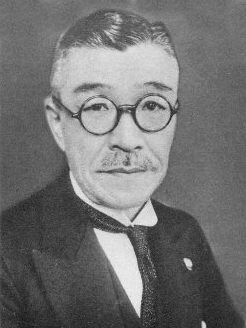

Minister of Justice
- In office 2 February 1937 – 30 August 1939
- Prime Minister: Senjuro Hayashi; Fumimaro Konoe; Hiranuma Kiichirō
- Preceded by: Raizaburō Hayashi
- Succeeded by: Chōgorō Miyagi

Minister of Communications
- In office 5 January 1939 – 7 April 1939
- Prime Minister: Hiranuma Kiichirō
- Preceded by: Ryūtarō Nagai
- Succeeded by: Harumichi Tanabe

Personal details
- Born: Shunpei Yamadera; 1 January 1880 Kanda, Tokyo, Japan
- Died: 7 January 1949 (aged 69)
- Education: Tokyo Imperial University

Suehiko Shiono (塩野季彦, Shiono Suehiko; born Shunpei Yamadera; 1 January 1880 – 7 January 1949) was a Japanese lawyer, politician and cabinet minister noted for his prosecution of high-profile cases of political crimes and thought crimes under the Peace Preservation Law of the Empire of Japan.

== Biography ==
Shiono was a native of Kanda in Tokyo (now part of Chiyoda, Tokyo) and was born as Shunpei Yamadera, the third son of an ex-samurai of Matsushiro Domain who had become a bureaucrat in the Meiji government's Ministry of Justice. As his father died when he was still a child, he was adopted by his uncle, Shiono Giken, who was chief prosecutor of the Tokyo District Court. He graduated in July 1906 from Tokyo Imperial University was a law degree, and had specialized in the study of German laws. The same year, he entered the Ministry of Justice. He subsequently served as substitute prosecutor at the Shizuoka District Court, deputy prosecutor at the Osaka District Court, and prosecutor at the Tokyo District Court in October 1927. Shiono conducted a thorough reform of the court, firing fifteen prosecutors he felt to be incompetent, and zealously pursuing a number of sensational political bribery cases involving high-ranking government officials, regardless of the political party affiliation of the suspects. He also presided of the massive arrests of communists and suspected communist sympathizers in the late 1920s.

Shiono was subsequently promoted to become head of the Prison Bureau in 1930, during his time he implemented prison reforms, such as the abolition of prison labor in mines and supporting efforts to "reform" people charged with thought crimes under the anti-communist Peace Preservation Laws. Shiono subsequently became prosecutor of the Court of Appeals, followed by chief prosecutor of the Tokyo District Court. Under his tenure, the prosecuted the Teijin Scandal, which brought down the government of Prime Minister Saito Makoto. In December 1936, Shiono was appointed vice-chief prosecutor of the Supreme Court of Judicature of Japan.

Shiono served as Minister of Justice under the Hayashi, First Konoe and Hiranuma cabinets from February 1937 to August 1939. He was concurrently Minister of Communications in the Hiranuma administration from January to April 1939. As Justice Minister, Shiono was noted for taking concrete action to increase police training in investigative methods, and to curb cases of police brutality and torture.

In 1946, along with all members of the wartime Japanese government, Shiono was purged from public office and was taken into custody by the American occupation authorities and held at Sugamo Prison. However, he was released without ever being formally charged.

Political offices
Preceded by Ryūtarō Nagai	Minister of Communications; 5 Jan 1939 – 7 Apr 1939	Succeeded by Harumichi Tanabe
Preceded by Raizaburō Hayashi	Minister of Justice; 2 Feb 1937 – 7 Apr 1939	Succeeded by Chōgorō Miyagi
