= Second Konoe cabinet =

Cabinet of Japan (1940–1941)

Second Konoe Cabinet
- 38th Cabinet of Japan

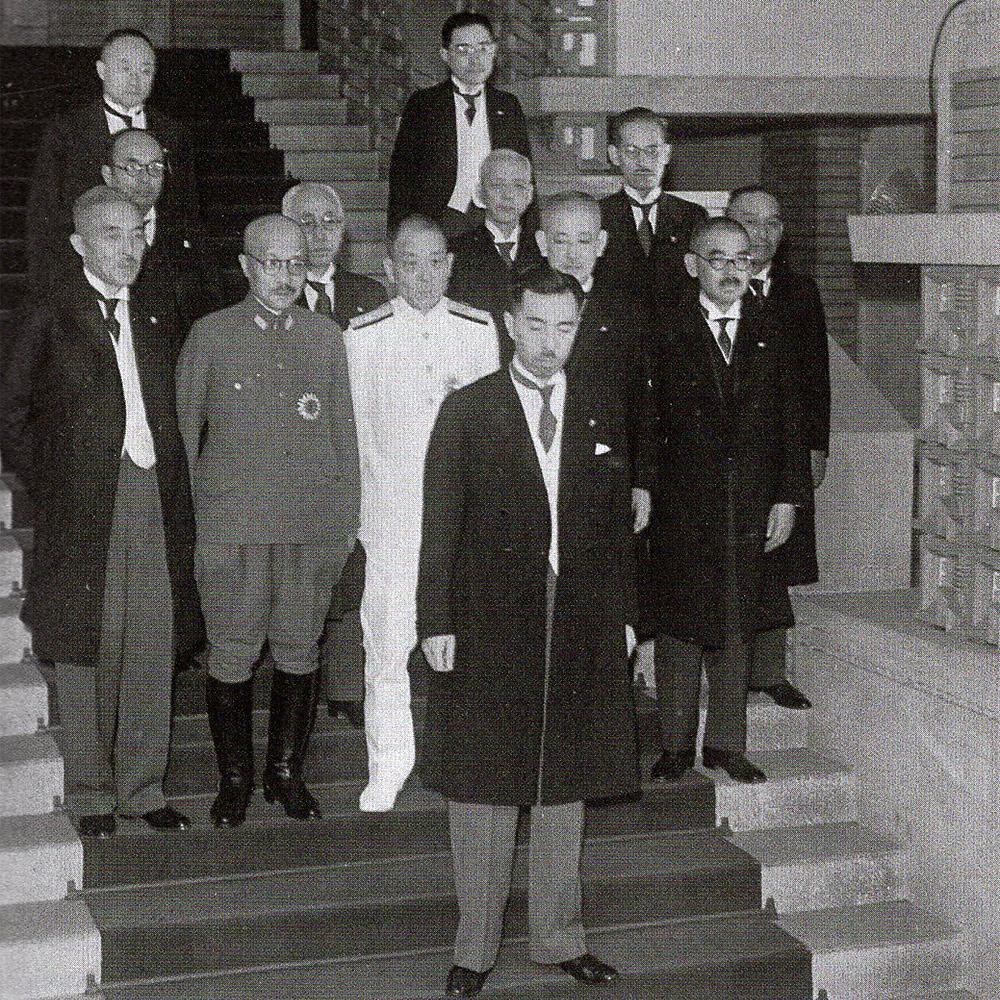
- Date formed: July 22, 1940
- Date dissolved: July 18, 1941

People and organisations
- Emperor: Shōwa
- Prime Minister: Fumimaro Konoe
- Member parties: Rikken Minseitō (until October 12, 1940); Rikken Seiyūkai (until October 12, 1940); Kokumin Dōmei (until October 12, 1940); Imperial Rule Assistance Association (from October 12, 1940); Independent; Military
- Status in legislature: Majority (coalition) (until October 12, 1940); One-party government (since October 12, 1940)

History
- Legislature term: 76th Imperial Diet
- Predecessor: Yonai Cabinet
- Successor: Third Konoe Cabinet

The Second Konoe Cabinet is the 38th Cabinet of Japan led by Fumimaro Konoe from July 22, 1940 to July 18, 1941.

== Cabinet ==
Ministers
Portfolio	Name	Political party	Term start	Term end
Prime Minister	Prince Fumimaro Konoe	Imperial Rule Assistance Association	July 22, 1940	July 18, 1941
Minister for Foreign Affairs	Yōsuke Matsuoka	Independent	July 22, 1940	July 18, 1941
Minister of Home Affairs	Yasui Eiji	Imperial Rule Assistance Association	July 22, 1940	December 21, 1940
Minister of Home Affairs	Baron Hiranuma Kiichirō	Independent	December 21, 1940	July 18, 1941
Minister of Finance	Kawada Isao	Independent	July 22, 1940	July 18, 1941
Minister of the Army	Hideki Tojo	Military (Army)	July 22, 1940	July 18, 1941
Minister of the Navy	Zengo Yoshida	Military (Navy)	July 22, 1940	September 5, 1940
Minister of the Navy	Koshirō Oikawa	Military (Navy)	September 5, 1940	July 18, 1941
Minister of Justice	Akira Kazami	Imperial Rule Assistance Association	July 22, 1940	December 21, 1940
Minister of Justice	Heisuke Yanagawa	Military (Army)	December 21, 1940	July 18, 1941
Minister of Education	Kunihiko Hashida	Independent	July 22, 1940	July 18, 1941
Minister of Agriculture, Forestry and Fisheries	Prince Fumimaro Konoe	Imperial Rule Assistance Association	July 22, 1940	July 24, 1940
Minister of Agriculture, Forestry and Fisheries	Tadaatsu Ishiguro	Independent	July 24, 1940	June 11, 1941
Minister of Agriculture, Forestry and Fisheries	Hiroya Ino	Independent	June 11, 1941	July 18, 1941
Minister of Commerce and Industry	Ichizō Kobayashi	Independent	July 24, 1940	April 4, 1941
Minister of Commerce and Industry	Teijirō Toyoda	Military (Navy)	April 4, 1941	July 18, 1941
Minister of Communications	Shōzō Murata	Independent	July 22, 1940	July 18, 1941
Minister of Railways	Shōzō Murata	Independent	July 22, 1940	September 28, 1940
Minister of Railways	Gōtarō Ogawa	Imperial Rule Assistance Association	September 28, 1940	July 18, 1941
Minister of Colonial Affairs	Yōsuke Matsuoka	Independent	July 22, 1940	September 28, 1940
Minister of Colonial Affairs	Kiyoshi Akita	Imperial Rule Assistance Association	September 28, 1940	July 18, 1941
Minister of Health	Yasui Eiji	Imperial Rule Assistance Association	July 22, 1940	September 28, 1940
Minister of Health	Tsuneo Kanemitsu	Imperial Rule Assistance Association	September 28, 1940	July 18, 1941
Minister without portfolio	Naoki Hoshino	Independent	July 22, 1940	December 6, 1940
Minister of State	Baron Hiranuma Kiichirō	Independent	December 6, 1940	December 21, 1940
Minister of State	Naoki Hoshino	Independent	December 6, 1940	April 4, 1941
Minister of State	Masatsune Ogura	Independent	April 4, 1941	July 18, 1941
Minister of State	Teiichi Suzuki	Military (Army)	April 4, 1941	July 18, 1941
Chief Cabinet Secretary	Kenji Tomita	Independent	July 22, 1940	July 18, 1941
Director-General of the Cabinet Legislation Bureau	Murase Naokai	Independent	July 22, 1940	July 18, 1941
