= Hiranuma Kiichirō =

Prime Minister of Japan in 1939

Baron Kiichirō Hiranuma
- 平沼 騏一郎
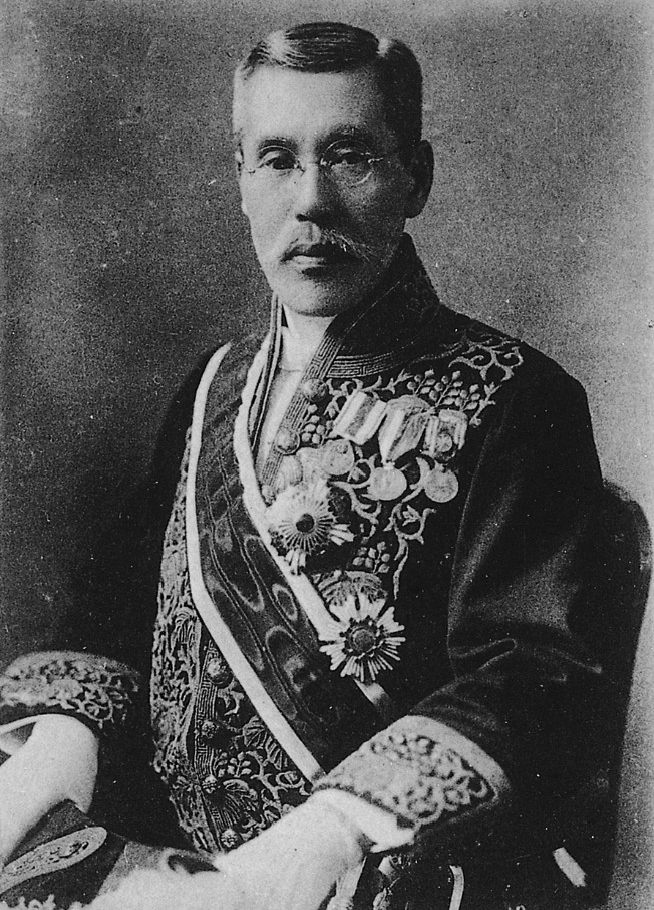
- Hiranuma in 1939, wearing his Privy Counsellor's uniform

Prime Minister of Japan
- In office 5 January 1939 – 30 August 1939
- Monarch: Shōwa
- Preceded by: Fumimaro Konoe
- Succeeded by: Nobuyuki Abe

President of the Privy Council
- In office 9 April 1945 – 3 December 1945
- Monarch: Shōwa
- Preceded by: Kantarō Suzuki
- Succeeded by: Kantarō Suzuki
- In office 13 March 1936 – 5 January 1939
- Monarch: Shōwa
- Preceded by: Ichiki Kitokuro
- Succeeded by: Fumimaro Konoe

Minister of Home Affairs
- In office 21 December 1940 – 18 July 1941
- Prime Minister: Fumimaro Konoe
- Preceded by: Eiji Yasui
- Succeeded by: Harumichi Tanabe

Vice President of the Privy Council
- In office 12 April 1926 – 13 March 1936
- Monarchs: Taishō; Shōwa
- President: Yūzaburō Kuratomi; Ichiki Kitokurō
- Preceded by: Yūzaburō Kuratomi
- Succeeded by: Arai Kentarō

Minister of Justice
- In office 6 September 1923 – 7 January 1924
- Prime Minister: Yamamoto Gonnohyōe
- Preceded by: Den Kenjirō
- Succeeded by: Suzuki Kisaburō

Member of the Privy Council
- In office 2 February 1924 – 12 April 1926
- Monarch: Taishō

Member of the House of Peers
- In office 9 January 1924 – 7 February 1924 Nominated by the Emperor

Chief Justice of the Supreme Court of Judicature of Japan
- In office 5 October 1921 – 5 September 1923
- Appointed by: Emperor Taishō
- Preceded by: Tomitani Shōtarō
- Succeeded by: Hideo Yokota

Personal details
- Born: 28 September 1867 Tsuyama, Mimasaka, Japan
- Died: 22 August 1952 (aged 84) Shinjuku, Tokyo, Japan
- Party: Independent
- Children: Takeo Hiranuma (adopted)
- Education: Tokyo Imperial University

Baron Kiichirō Hiranuma (平沼 騏一郎; 28 September 1867 – 22 August 1952) was a Japanese lawyer and politician who served as Prime Minister of Japan in 1939.

Hiranuma rose to prominence as a prosecutor and official in the Ministry of Justice. He served as minister of Justice under Prime Minister Yamamoto Gonnohyōe and later became a privy counsellor. After serving as president of the privy council, he became prime minister in 1939, but resigned later the same year. He later returned to cabinet under Fumimaro Konoe. After the Japanese surrender, he was sentenced to life imprisonment by the International Military Tribunal for the Far East for his role in World War II.

== Early life and education ==
Hiranuma was born on 28 September 1867, in what is now Tsuyama City, Okayama Prefecture, as the son of a low-ranking samurai from the Tsuyama Domain of Mimasaka Province. His upbringing and early education was steeped in bushido and the study of Chinese classics. Hiranuma graduated with a degree in English law from Tokyo Imperial University in 1888.

Hiranuma reacted against the rapid westernisation and disregard for Japanese culture common at that time. Throughout his life, his political principles would be substantially based on Confucianism as taught by the Mito School. Like the Mito scholars, Hiranuma believed that Japan possessed a particular essence, the kokutai, characterised by the moral bond between the nation and the Emperor as a sacred ruler. Foreign influences, unless properly adapted, he viewed as threats to the kokutai.

== Ministry of Justice ==
After graduation, Hiranuma obtained a post in the Ministry of Justice. Hiranuma established a reputation during his time at the Ministry of Justice as a strong opponent of government corruption, and successfully handled a number of high-profile cases. He served as director of the Tokyo High Court, public prosecutor of the Supreme Court of Japan, and Director of the Civil and Criminal Affairs Bureau. In 1909, he secured the conviction of 25 former and serving members of the Diet of Japan for accepting bribes from the Japan Sugar Company.

Hiranuma was highly outspoken against corruption and immorality in Japan's political parties, and that attitude soon expanded to include what he saw to be foreign threats, such as socialism and liberal democracy. As Hiranuma rose within the ministry he attracted a considerable following among his juniors, notably including Kisaburo Suzuki and Suehiko Shiono.

In 1911, he was chief prosecutor for the High Treason Incident, the 1910 socialist-anarchist plot to assassinate the Meiji Emperor. The closed-court trial of 25 men and 1 woman, including 4 Buddhist monks, resulted in the execution of 12, including the prominent anarchist Shūsui Kōtoku and the feminist Kanno Suga.

He rose to become Vice Minister of Justice in 1911 and Prosecutor General in 1912. In 1915, he forced Home Minister Ōura Kanetake in the cabinet of Prime Minister Ōkuma Shigenobu to resign for suspected bribery in what is known as the Ōura scandal. In 1921, Hiranuma became Chief Justice of the Supreme Court.

Hiranuma was appointed Minister of Justice in the second cabinet of Gonnohyōe Yamamoto, formed in the aftermath of the Great Kantō earthquake in September 1923. Hiranuma resigned along with rest of the cabinet in January 1924 to take responsibility for the lapse in security represented by the Toranomon incident, in which a communist attempted to assassinate Crown Prince Hirohito. The incident gave Hiranuma a renewed vigilance towards what he considered subversive ideology and for this reason he formed the Kokuhonsha, a political organisation with the intention of defending the kokutai. This organisation gathered a broad range of influential figures, including General Sadao Araki, Admiral Kanji Katō, Kisaburo Suzuki, Yoshimichi Hara and Harumichi Tanabe.

At the nomination of the new prime minister Keigo Kiyoura, Hiranuma was appointed to the Privy Council in February 1924.

== Privy Councillor ==
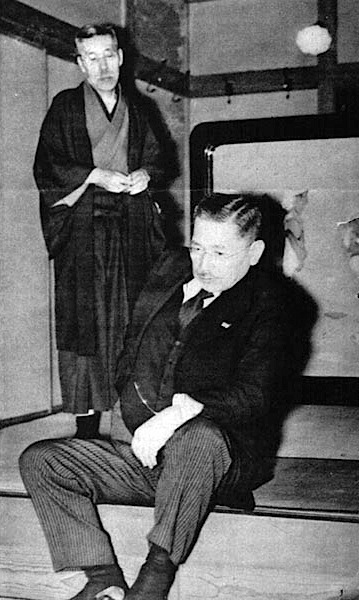
Lord Privy Seal Kurahei Yuasa visits Hiranuma in preparation to visit Prince Saionji for final selection of the next Prime Minister, 31 May 1937.

While serving on the Privy Council, Hiranuma continued to exercise a strong influence on the Ministry of Justice. Hiranuma and his clique were the driving force behind the adoption of the Peace Preservation Law, intended to combat communism and other threats to the kokutai.

In April 1926 Yūzaburō Kuratomi, one of Hiranuma's old superiors in the Ministry of Justice, was appointed president of the Privy Council. Upon Kuratomi's request, Hiranuma was appointed vice president. Hiranuma would serve in that role for ten years and exerted considerable influence. Hiranuma, together with the senior privy counsellors Miyoji Ito and Kentaro Kaneko, would lead the conservatives who dominated the council. In October of the same year, Hiranuma was elevated to the rank of baron (男爵, danshaku) in the Kazoku peerage system abolished by the 1947 Constitution.

Hiranuma was strongly opposed to Prime Minister Wakatsuki Reijirō's efforts at economic reform. He was also strongly opposed to the ratification of the London Naval Treaty of 1930. In 1931, he rallied support within the government for the Imperial Japanese Army after it had seized control of Manchuria without prior authorization, and he later helped in the creation of Manchukuo. He also pushed for Japan's withdrawal from the League of Nations. According to one theory, he in 1934 he directed the prosecution during the Teijin Incident.

During the 1930s, Hiranuma was often considered as a candidate for prime minister, but he had incurred the enmity of the last genrō Prince Saionji, who had the right to nominate the prime minister. As a supporter of parliamentary government, Saionji disliked Hiranuma for undermining party cabinets. Furthermore, Saionji was wary of the influence of the Kokuhonsha, which he considered to be close to fascism. Hiranuma himself denied any association with fascism, which he considered a foreign ideology unsuitable for Japan.

When Kuratomi retired in May 1934 he recommended Hiranuma as his successor, but due to Saionji's opposition the Imperial Household Minister Kitokurō Ichiki was appointed instead. Hiranuma was appointed President of the Privy Council after Ichiki's retirement in February 1936.

== Premiership (1939) ==
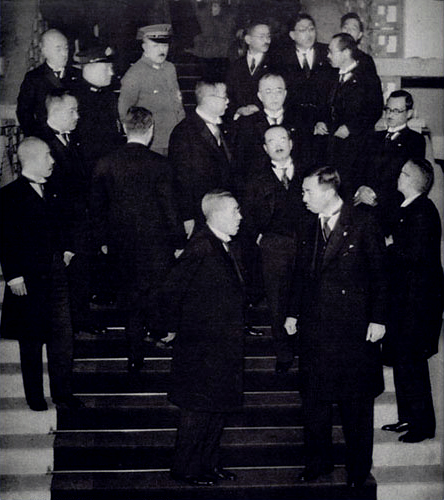
The Hiranuma Cabinet, including Minister-without-Portfolio Fumimaro Konoe (to the right of Hiranuma), Interior Minister Kōichi Kido (second row, between Hiranuma and Konoe), Naval Minister Mitsumasa Yonai (back row, with dark military suit) and War Minister Seishirō Itagaki (to the right of Yonai, with light military suit), 5 January 1939.

Hiranuma served as Prime Minister of Japan from 5 January to 30 August 1939. His administration was dominated by the debate on whether Japan should ally itself with Germany against the Soviet Union. Hiranuma wanted an anticommunist pact, but feared a military alliance would commit Japan to war against the United States and the United Kingdom when most of its armed forces were already committed to the Second Sino-Japanese War.

With the signing of the German-Soviet Non-Aggression Pact in August 1939, Hiranuma's cabinet resigned over that foreign policy issue and over the massive defeat of the Japanese Army in Mongolia during the Nomonhan Incident against the Soviet Union.

== Return to cabinet ==
Hiranuma became a central figure in a conservative reaction against the New Order Movement promoted by Fumimaro Konoe since his reappointment as prime minister in July 1940. Hiranuma criticised the Imperial Rule Assistance Association as a potential "new shogunate" prejudicial to the prerogatives of the Emperor. Hiranuma was furthermore concerned that the new organisation was being dominated by radicals with socialist tendencies, such as Yoriyasu Arima, Kingoro Hashimoto and Seigo Nakano.

Eventually Konoe himself began to feel that the New Order Movement had become too radical. As a solution for this Hiranuma entered the cabinet as Home Minister in December 1940. Hiranuma's associate, Lieutenant General Heisuke Yanagawa became minister of justice at the same time. Hiranuma moved to neutralise the IRAA, stating in the Diet in January 1941 that the IRAA would not conduct politics, but merely serve as a public association supporting the state. In March the leadership of the IRAA was replaced, with Yanagawa being appointed to the hitherto vacant post of vice president and the moderate former Finance Minister Sōtarō Ishiwata replacing Yoriyasu Arima as secretary general. Hiranuma declared in April that IRAA would be under the supervision and control of the Home Ministry.

As Home Minister, he was a staunch defender of State Shinto. Hiranuma declared: "We should research the ancient rites in detail and consider their application in administrative affairs in general and the common life of the nation.”

Hiranuma was strongly opposed to the political and diplomatic actions of Foreign Minister Yōsuke Matsuoka and to the Tripartite Pact concluded between Imperial Japan, Nazi Germany, and Fascist Italy in September 1940. The cabinet was reshuffled in July 1941 in order to remove Matsuoka, partially due to Hiranuma's maneuvering.

In the new cabinet Matsuoka was replaced by Admiral Teijiro Toyoda. Hiranuma and Yanagawa became ministers without portfolio, with Hiranuma's protégé Harumichi Tanabe as his successor in the Home Ministry. During this period Hiranuma frequently met with the American Ambassador Joseph Grew in order to de-escalate the conflict between Japan and America. In August 1941 was Hiranuma attacked in his home by a member of a small ultranationalist group. Despite being shot six times Hiranuma survived and fully recovered.

Hiranuma withdrew from government upon the resignation of Konoe in October 1941.

== Jushin ==
Like other former prime ministers, Hiranuma served as one of the jushin (重臣), or unofficial senior advisors, to Emperor Hirohito during World War II. Hiranuma saw the jushin as the core of a new group of genrō advisors, as the last surviving Meiji period genrō, Prince Saionji Kinmochi, had died in November 1940. The new group included former prime ministers Mitsumasa Yonai, Nobuyuki Abe and Fumimaro Konoe. In April 1945, Hiranuma was again appointed president of the Privy Council.

== Prosecution and conviction ==
After the War, he was arrested by the American Occupation Authorities and was convicted by the International Military Tribunal for the Far East as a Class A War Criminal.

He was given a life sentence, but paroled in early 1952, and died shortly afterwards. His grave is in Tama Cemetery, outside Tokyo.

Political offices
Preceded by Fumimaro Konoe	Prime Minister of Japan; 1939	Succeeded by Nobuyuki Abe
Preceded by Ejii Yasui	Minister of Home Affairs; 1940–1941	Succeeded by Harumichi Tanabe
