= First Konoe cabinet =

Cabinet of Japan (1937–1939)

First Konoe Cabinet
- 34th Cabinet of Japan

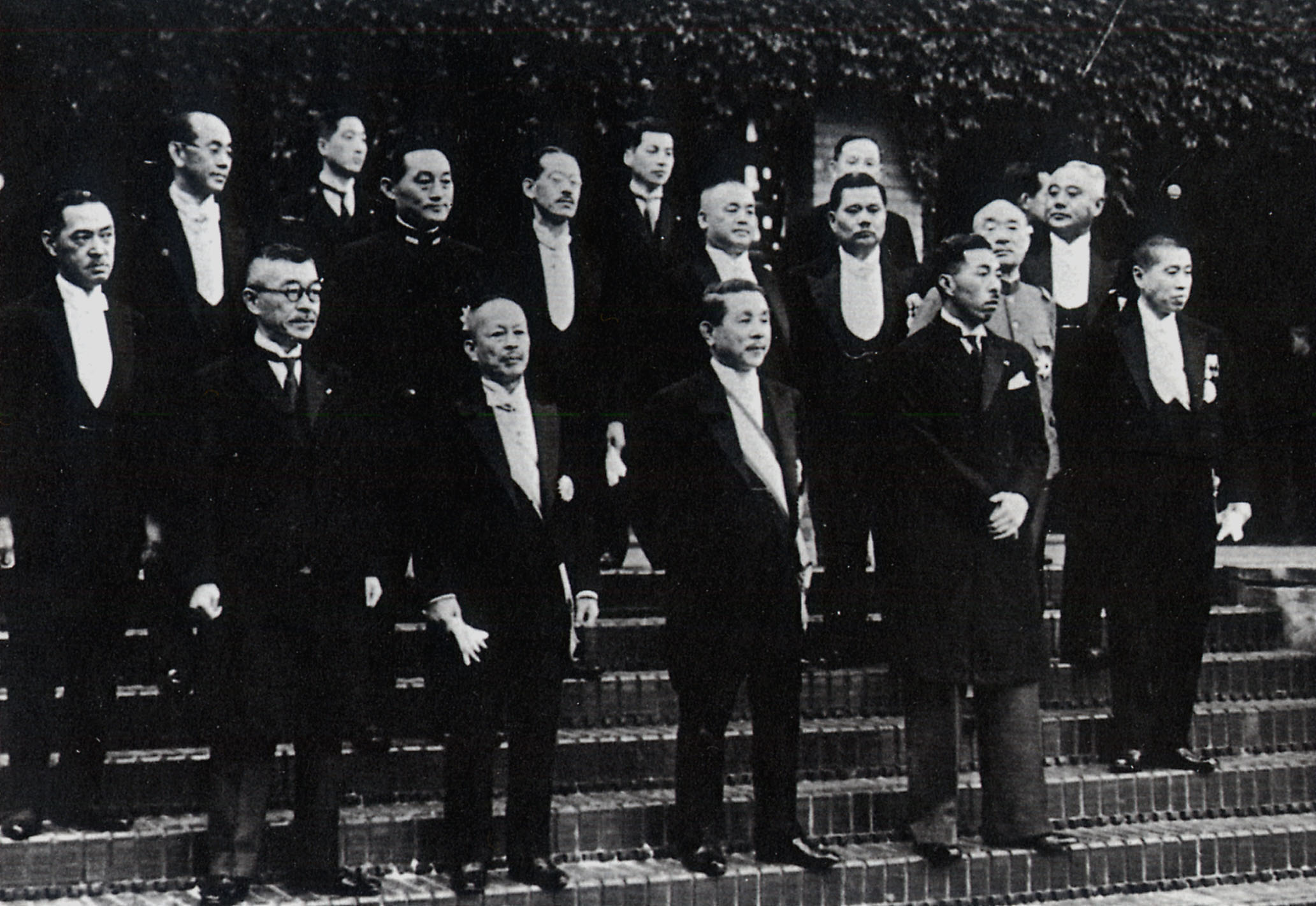
- Date formed: June 4, 1937
- Date dissolved: January 5, 1939

People and organisations
- Emperor: Shōwa
- Prime Minister: Fumimaro Konoe
- Status in legislature: Majority (coalition)

History
- Legislature terms: 71st Imperial Diet; 72nd Imperial Diet; 73rd Imperial Diet; 74th Imperial Diet
- Predecessor: Hayashi Cabinet
- Successor: Hiranuma Cabinet

The First Konoe Cabinet is the 34th Cabinet of Japan led by Fumimaro Konoe from June 4, 1937, to January 5, 1939.

== Cabinet ==
Ministers
Portfolio	Name	Political party	Term start	Term end
Prime Minister	Prince Fumimaro Konoe	Independent	June 4, 1937	January 5, 1939
Minister for Foreign Affairs	Kōki Hirota	Independent	June 4, 1937	May 26, 1938
Minister of Home Affairs	Eiichi Baba	Independent	June 4, 1937	December 14, 1937
Minister of Home Affairs	Nobumasa Suetsugu	Military (Navy)	December 14, 1937	January 5, 1939
Minister of Finance	Okinori Kaya	Independent	June 4, 1937	May 26, 1938
Minister of the Army	Hajime Sugiyama	Military (Army)	June 4, 1937	June 3, 1938
Minister of the Navy	Mitsumasa Yonai	Military (Navy)	June 4, 1937	January 5, 1939
Minister of Justice	Suehiko Shiono	Independent	June 4, 1937	January 5, 1939
Minister of Education	Eiji Yasui	Independent	June 4, 1937	October 22, 1937
Minister of Education	Marquess Kōichi Kido	Independent	October 22, 1937	May 26, 1938
Minister of Agriculture, Forestry and Fisheries	Count Yoriyasu Arima	Independent	June 4, 1937	January 5, 1939
Minister of Commerce and Industry	Shinji Yoshino	Independent	June 4, 1937	May 26, 1938
Minister of Communications	Ryūtarō Nagai	Rikken Minseitō	June 4, 1937	January 5, 1939
Minister of Railways	Chikuhei Nakajima	Rikken Seiyūkai	June 4, 1937	January 5, 1939
Minister of Colonial Affairs	Sonyu Ōtani	Independent	June 4, 1937	June 25, 1938
Minister of Health	Marquess Kōichi Kido	Independent	January 11, 1938	January 5, 1939
Chief Cabinet Secretary	Akira Kazami	Independent	June 4, 1937	January 5, 1939
Director-General of the Cabinet Legislation Bureau	Masao Taki	Independent	June 4, 1937	October 25, 1937
Director-General of the Cabinet Legislation Bureau	Naka Funada	Rikken Seiyūkai	October 25, 1937	January 5, 1939
Parliamentary Vice-Ministers
Portfolio	Name	Political party	Term start	Term end
Parliamentary Vice-Minister for Foreign Affairs	Matsumoto Tadao	Rikken Minseitō	June 24, 1937	January 5, 1939
Parliamentary Vice-Minister of Home Affairs	Katsuta Eikichi	Rikken Minseitō	June 24, 1937	January 5, 1939
Parliamentary Vice-Minister of Finance	Ōta Masataka	Rikken Seiyūkai	June 24, 1937	January 5, 1939
Parliamentary Vice-Minister of the Army	Katō Kumeshirō	Rikken Seiyūkai	June 24, 1937	January 5, 1939
Parliamentary Vice-Minister of the Navy	Ichinomiya Fusajirō	Rikken Minseitō	June 24, 1937	January 5, 1939
Parliamentary Vice-Minister of Justice	Hisayama Tomoyuki	Rikken Seiyūkai	June 24, 1937	January 5, 1939
Parliamentary Vice-Minister of Education	Uchigasaki Sakusaburō	Rikken Minseitō	June 24, 1937	January 5, 1939
Parliamentary Vice-Minister of Agriculture, Forestry and Fisheries	Takahashi Morihei	Rikken Minseitō	June 24, 1937	January 5, 1939
Parliamentary Vice-Minister of Commerce and Industry	Kogure Budayū	Rikken Seiyūkai	June 24, 1937	January 5, 1939
Parliamentary Vice-Minister of Communications	Tajima Katsutarō	Rikken Minseitō	June 24, 1937	January 5, 1939
Parliamentary Vice-Minister of Railways	Tajiri Seigo	Rikken Seiyūkai	June 24, 1937	January 5, 1939
Parliamentary Vice-Minister of Colonial Affairs	Yasumi Saburō	Rikken Seiyūkai	June 24, 1937	January 5, 1939
Parliamentary Vice-Minister of Health	Kudō Tetsuo	Rikken Minseitō	January 18, 1938	January 5, 1939
Parliamentary Undersecretaries
Portfolio	Name	Political party	Term start	Term end
Parliamentary Undersecretary for Foreign Affairs	Funada Naka	Rikken Seiyūkai	June 24, 1937	October 25, 1937
Parliamentary Undersecretary for Foreign Affairs	Vacant		October 25, 1937	December 15, 1937
Parliamentary Undersecretary for Foreign Affairs	Haruna Seishō	Independent	December 15, 1937	January 5, 1939
Parliamentary Undersecretary of Home Affairs	Kimura Masayoshi	Rikken Minseitō	June 24, 1937	January 5, 1939
Parliamentary Undersecretary of Finance	Nakamura Sannojo	Rikken Minseitō	June 24, 1937	January 5, 1939
Parliamentary Undersecretary of the Army	Hisa Shōhei	Rikken Minseitō	June 24, 1937	January 5, 1939
Parliamentary Undersecretary of the Navy	Kishida Masaki	Independent	June 24, 1937	January 5, 1939
Parliamentary Undersecretary of Justice	Fujita Wakami	Rikken Minseitō	June 24, 1937	January 5, 1939
Parliamentary Undersecretary of Education	Akagi Kōhei	Rikken Minseitō	June 24, 1937	January 5, 1939
Parliamentary Undersecretary of Agriculture, Forestry and Fisheries	Sukegawa Keishirō	Rikken Seiyūkai	June 24, 1937	January 5, 1939
Parliamentary Undersecretary of Commerce and Industry	Satō Kennosuke	Rikken Minseitō	June 24, 1937	January 5, 1939
Parliamentary Undersecretary of Communications	Takeru Inukai	Rikken Seiyūkai	June 24, 1937	January 5, 1939
Parliamentary Undersecretary of Railways	Masao Kanai	Independent	June 24, 1937	January 5, 1939
Parliamentary Undersecretary of Colonial Affairs	Irei Hajime	Kokumin Dōmei	June 24, 1937	January 5, 1939
Parliamentary Undersecretary of Health	Yamamoto Yoshiji	Rikken Seiyūkai	January 18, 1938	January 5, 1939

== Reshuffled Cabinet ==
A Cabinet reshuffle took place on May 26, 1938.

Ministers
Portfolio	Name	Political party	Term start	Term end
Prime Minister	Prince Fumimaro Konoe	Independent	June 4, 1937	January 5, 1939
Minister for Foreign Affairs	Kazushige Ugaki	Military (Army)	May 26, 1938	September 30, 1938
Minister for Foreign Affairs	Prince Fumimaro Konoe	Independent	September 30, 1938	October 29, 1938
Minister for Foreign Affairs	Hachirō Arita	Independent	October 29, 1938	January 5, 1939
Minister of Home Affairs	Nobumasa Suetsugu	Military (Navy)	December 14, 1937	January 5, 1939
Minister of Finance	Shigeaki Ikeda	Independent	May 26, 1938	January 5, 1939
Minister of the Army	Hajime Sugiyama	Military (Army)	June 4, 1937	June 3, 1938
Minister of the Army	Seishirō Itagaki	Military (Army)	June 3, 1938	January 5, 1939
Minister of the Navy	Mitsumasa Yonai	Military (Navy)	June 4, 1937	January 5, 1939
Minister of Justice	Suehiko Shiono	Independent	June 4, 1937	January 5, 1939
Minister of Education	Baron Sadao Araki	Military (Army)	May 26, 1938	January 5, 1939
Minister of Agriculture, Forestry and Fisheries	Count Yoriyasu Arima	Independent	June 4, 1937	January 5, 1939
Minister of Commerce and Industry	Shigeaki Ikeda	Independent	May 26, 1938	January 5, 1939
Minister of Communications	Ryūtarō Nagai	Rikken Minseitō	June 4, 1937	January 5, 1939
Minister of Railways	Chikuhei Nakajima	Rikken Seiyūkai	June 4, 1937	January 5, 1939
Minister of Colonial Affairs	Sonyu Ōtani	Independent	June 4, 1937	June 25, 1938
Minister of Colonial Affairs	Kazushige Ugaki	Military (Army)	June 25, 1938	September 30, 1938
Minister of Colonial Affairs	Prince Fumimaro Konoe	Independent	September 30, 1938	October 29, 1938
Minister of Colonial Affairs	Yoshiaki Hatta	Independent	October 29, 1938	January 5, 1939
Minister of Health	Marquess Kōichi Kido	Independent	January 11, 1938	January 5, 1939
Chief Cabinet Secretary	Akira Kazami	Independent	June 4, 1937	January 5, 1939
Director-General of the Cabinet Legislation Bureau	Naka Funada	Rikken Seiyūkai	October 25, 1937	January 5, 1939
Parliamentary Vice-Ministers
Portfolio	Name	Political party	Term start	Term end
Parliamentary Vice-Minister for Foreign Affairs	Matsumoto Tadao	Rikken Minseitō	June 24, 1937	January 5, 1939
Parliamentary Vice-Minister of Home Affairs	Katsuta Eikichi	Rikken Minseitō	June 24, 1937	January 5, 1939
Parliamentary Vice-Minister of Finance	Ōta Masataka	Rikken Seiyūkai	June 24, 1937	January 5, 1939
Parliamentary Vice-Minister of the Army	Katō Kumeshirō	Rikken Seiyūkai	June 24, 1937	January 5, 1939
Parliamentary Vice-Minister of the Navy	Ichinomiya Fusajirō	Rikken Minseitō	June 24, 1937	January 5, 1939
Parliamentary Vice-Minister of Justice	Hisayama Tomoyuki	Rikken Seiyūkai	June 24, 1937	January 5, 1939
Parliamentary Vice-Minister of Education	Uchigasaki Sakusaburō	Rikken Minseitō	June 24, 1937	January 5, 1939
Parliamentary Vice-Minister of Agriculture, Forestry and Fisheries	Takahashi Morihei	Rikken Minseitō	June 24, 1937	January 5, 1939
Parliamentary Vice-Minister of Commerce and Industry	Kogure Budayū	Rikken Seiyūkai	June 24, 1937	January 5, 1939
Parliamentary Vice-Minister of Communications	Tajima Katsutarō	Rikken Minseitō	June 24, 1937	January 5, 1939
Parliamentary Vice-Minister of Railways	Tajiri Seigo	Rikken Seiyūkai	June 24, 1937	January 5, 1939
Parliamentary Vice-Minister of Colonial Affairs	Yasumi Saburō	Rikken Seiyūkai	June 24, 1937	January 5, 1939
Parliamentary Vice-Minister of Health	Kudō Tetsuo	Rikken Minseitō	January 18, 1938	January 5, 1939
Parliamentary Undersecretaries
Portfolio	Name	Political party	Term start	Term end
Parliamentary Undersecretary for Foreign Affairs	Haruna Seishō	Independent	December 15, 1937	January 5, 1939
Parliamentary Undersecretary of Home Affairs	Kimura Masayoshi	Rikken Minseitō	June 24, 1937	January 5, 1939
Parliamentary Undersecretary of Finance	Nakamura Sannojo	Rikken Minseitō	June 24, 1937	January 5, 1939
Parliamentary Undersecretary of the Army	Hisa Shōhei	Rikken Minseitō	June 24, 1937	January 5, 1939
Parliamentary Undersecretary of the Navy	Kishida Masaki	Independent	June 24, 1937	January 5, 1939
Parliamentary Undersecretary of Justice	Fujita Wakami	Rikken Minseitō	June 24, 1937	January 5, 1939
Parliamentary Undersecretary of Education	Akagi Kōhei	Rikken Minseitō	June 24, 1937	January 5, 1939
Parliamentary Undersecretary of Agriculture, Forestry and Fisheries	Sukegawa Keishirō	Rikken Seiyūkai	June 24, 1937	January 5, 1939
Parliamentary Undersecretary of Commerce and Industry	Satō Kennosuke	Rikken Minseitō	June 24, 1937	January 5, 1939
Parliamentary Undersecretary of Communications	Takeru Inukai	Rikken Seiyūkai	June 24, 1937	January 5, 1939
Parliamentary Undersecretary of Railways	Masao Kanai	Independent	June 24, 1937	January 5, 1939
Parliamentary Undersecretary of Colonial Affairs	Irei Hajime	Kokumin Dōmei	June 24, 1937	January 5, 1939
Parliamentary Undersecretary of Health	Yamamoto Yoshiji	Rikken Seiyūkai	January 18, 1938	January 5, 1939
