= Naoki Hoshino =

Japanese official, war criminal 1892-1978

- 星野 直樹
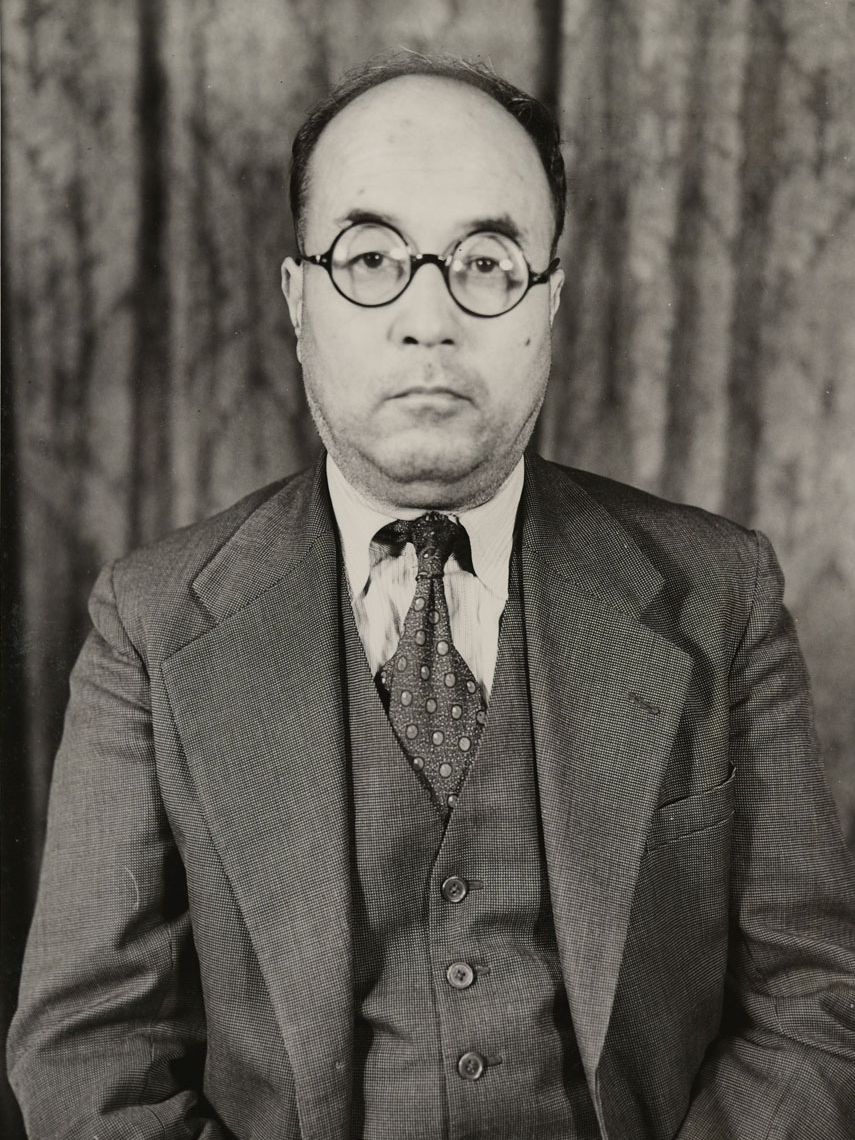
- Hoshino Naoki at time of Tokyo Tribunal

Chief Cabinet Secretary
- In office 18 October 1941 – 22 July 1944
- Prime Minister: Hideki Tojo
- Preceded by: Kenji Tomita
- Succeeded by: Kunio Miura

President of the Planning Board
- In office 22 July 1940 – 4 April 1941
- Prime Minister: Fumimaro Konoe
- Preceded by: Kakichi Takeuchi
- Succeeded by: Teiichi Suzuki

Member of the House of Peers
- In office 4 April 1941 – 15 December 1945 Nominated by the Emperor

Director of the General Affairs Board of Manchukuo
- In office 16 December 1936 – 21 July 1940
- Prime Minister: Zhang Jinghui
- Preceded by: Shigeo Ōdachi
- Succeeded by: Rokuzō Takebe

Personal details
- Born: 4 October 1892 Yokohama, Kanagawa, Japan
- Died: 16 January 1978 (aged 85) Tokyo, Japan
- Party: Independent
- Education: Tokyo Imperial University

Naoki Hoshino (星野 直樹, Hoshino Naoki; 10 April 1892 – 26 January 1978) was a Japanese politician who served as Chief Cabinet Secretary under Prime Minister Hideki Tojo from 1941 to 1944. He served in the Ministry of Finance during the Taishō and early Shōwa period, and was a senior official in the Empire of Manchukuo.

After World War II he was prosecuted for war crimes by the International Military Tribunal of the Far East and sentenced to life imprisonment, but he was released in 1958.

== Biography ==
=== Early life and career ===
Hoshino was born in Yokohama, where his father was involved in the textile industry. His paternal aunt was principal of the Tsuda College, a noted women's university. Hoshino graduated from the law school of Tokyo Imperial University, and on graduation he was employed by the Ministry of Finance. He rose through the ranks in various capacities, ranging from bank regulation to taxation, and in 1932, became chief of the state property section in the Ministry.

=== Manchukuo ===
Following the Japanese invasion of Manchuria and the establishment of the puppet state of Manchukuo he led a team of bureaucrats from the Ministry of Finance sent to provide an infrastructure for finances for the new territory in July 1932, first serving as chief of the General Affairs Bureau in the Department of Finance. Hoshino oversaw the creation of the state opium monopoly in Manchukuo. The official aim of the monopoly was the gradual suppression of opium addiction, which was widespread in the region, but critics alleged that the monopoly stimulated addiction, serving as a source of revenue and a tool to soften resistance to Japanese occupation.

In June 1936 Hoshino was appointed Vice Minister of Finance in Manchukuo. In December 1936 he was further promoted to director of the General Affairs Board (総務庁), the de facto senior civilian official in the country.

=== Wartime role ===
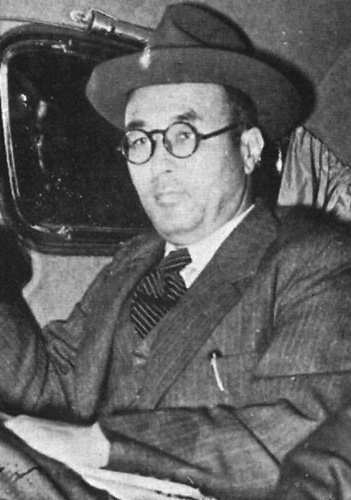
Hoshino in 1941

In July 1940, Hoshino was recalled to Japan to serve in the Second Konoe Cabinet as minister of state and chief of the Planning Board, an economic and policy planning organ under the Prime Minister. In this position he was in charge of formulating a plan for economic reorganization in line with the New Order Movement. The plan formulated by Hoshino aimed to take economic power from the zaibatsu and concentrate it in the government, but this was denounced as "communistic" by industry minister Ichizo Kobayashi and the Keidanren. A moderated plan was later adopted, but many officials in the Planning Board were arrested as suspected communists. Konoe had both Hoshino and Kobayashi resign from cabinet in April 1941. Upon his resignation, Hoshino was appointed to the House of Peers.

When General Hideki Tojo succeeded Konoe as Prime Minister in October 1941, he named Hoshino as his Chief Cabinet Secretary. Hoshino assisted Tojo in selecting the cabinet. Hoshino held his position until Tojo resigned in July 1944.

=== Trial and later life ===
After the surrender of Japan, he was arrested by the American occupation authorities and tried before the International Military Tribunal of the Far East as a Class A war criminal on counts 1, 27, 29, 31, 32 together with other members of the Manchurian administration responsible for the Japanese policies there. He was found guilty and sentenced to life imprisonment at Sugamo Prison in Tokyo.

He was released from jail in 1958 and served as director, president or chairman of a number of companies, including the Tokyu Corporation. He published his memoirs in 1963, which created somewhat of a sensation for his undiminished admiration of Japanese accomplishments in Manchukuo, and his unexpected lack of respect for Tojo. He died in Tokyo in 1978.
