= Suzuki Kisaburō =

Japanese politician

- 鈴木 喜三郎
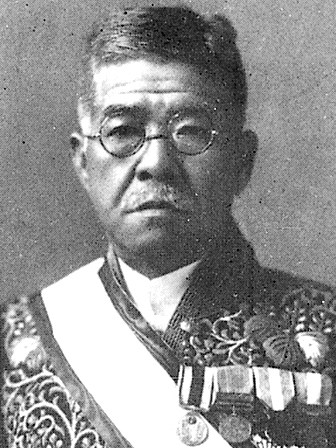

President of the Rikken Seiyūkai
- In office 20 May 1932 – 15 February 1937
- Preceded by: Inukai Tsuyoshi
- Succeeded by: Vacant

Minister of Home Affairs
- In office 25 March 1932 – 26 May 1932
- Prime Minister: Inukai Tsuyoshi
- Preceded by: Nakahashi Tokugorō
- Succeeded by: Yamamoto Tatsuo
- In office 20 April 1927 – 4 May 1928
- Prime Minister: Tanaka Giichi
- Preceded by: Hamaguchi Osachi
- Succeeded by: Mochizuki Keisuke

Minister of Justice
- In office 13 December 1931 – 25 March 1932
- Prime Minister: Inukai Tsuyoshi
- Preceded by: Chifuyu Watanabe
- Succeeded by: Kawamura Takeji
- In office 7 January 1924 – 11 June 1924
- Prime Minister: Kiyoura Keigo
- Preceded by: Hiranuma Kiichirō
- Succeeded by: Sennosuke Yokota

Member of the House of Peers
- In office 28 April 1936 – 24 June 1940 Nominated by the Emperor
- In office 2 June 1920 – 21 January 1932 Nominated by the Emperor

Member of the House of Representatives
- In office 20 February 1932 – 21 January 1936
- Preceded by: Tetsu Katayama
- Succeeded by: Tetsu Katayama
- Constituency: Kanagawa 2nd

Prosecutor-General of Japan
- In office 5 October 1921 – 7 January 1924
- Preceded by: Hiranuma Kiichirō
- Succeeded by: Matsukichi Koyama

Personal details
- Born: Kawashima Kisaburō; 6 November 1867 Kawasaki, Kanagawa, Japan
- Died: 24 June 1940 (aged 72) Chiyoda, Tokyo, Japan
- Resting place: Yanaka Cemetery
- Party: Rikken Seiyūkai
- Spouse: Kazuka Hatoyama
- Relatives: Hatoyama family
- Education: Tokyo Imperial University

Suzuki Kisaburō (鈴木 喜三郎; né Kawashima; 6 November 1867 – 24 June 1940) was a Japanese politician, judge, prosecutor and educator who was Minister of Justice from 1931 to 1932 and Minister of Home Affairs in 1932.

== Early life and education ==
Suzuki was born Kawashima Kisaburō in what is now part of the city of Kawasaki, Kanagawa. A younger son, he was adopted at an early age by Suzuki Jiko, a Buddhist prelate in Kawasaki, and received the Suzuki surname.

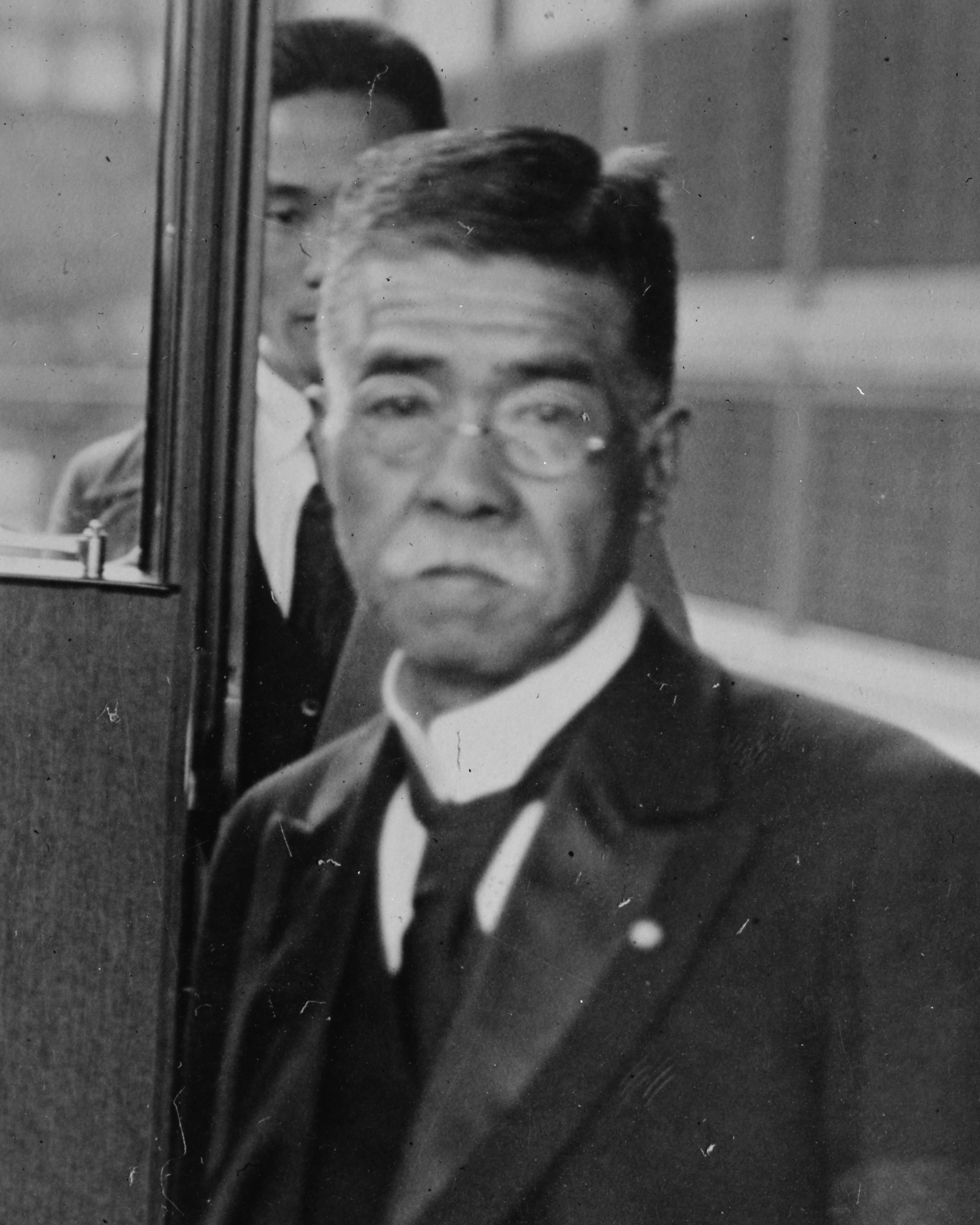
Kisaburo Suzuki after 1900

He was a graduate of the law school of Tokyo Imperial University in 1891.

== Career ==
Suzuki entered the Ministry of Justice in 1891 as a judge. In 1893, he became a judge at the Tokyo District Court then its Chief Judge in 1907 and subsequently was promoted to the Tokyo Court of Appeals, and finally to the Supreme Court of Judicature of Japan, where he was noted for his quick judgments. He then served as Chief of the Criminal Affairs Bureau of the Justice Ministry, Vice Minister of Justice, and Prosecutor General in 1921.

Suzuki’s political career began in 1920, when he was appointed to the House of Peers. In 1924, he was selected as Justice Minister in the cabinet of Kiyoura Keigo. During this period, he lent aid to and was "very active" in the Kokuhonsha, a nationalist organization founded by Hiranuma Kiichirō "to combat the spread of liberal and foreign ideas". Following the collapse of the Kiyoura administration in 1926, Suzuki joined the Rikken Seiyūkai. The following year, he joined the administration of Tanaka Giichi as Home Minister. While Home Minister, he strengthened the Tokubetsu Kōtō Keisatsu and enforcement of the stricter Peace Preservation Laws, and took an uncompromisingly harsh position against activities by the outlawed Japan Communist Party, culminating in the March 15 incident which involved the arrest of hundreds of known party members and suspected party sympathizers. He also used his position as Home Minister to replace 17 prefectural governors with Rikken Seiyūkai members, as well as showing favoritism to promotions within the Ministry itself towards party members. These actions led to his forced resignation in 1928 after charges were made this constituted illegal interference with the 1928 General Election.

Suzuki returned to the Diet of Japan in the 1932 General Election, when he was elected to the House of Representatives from the Kanagawa 2nd district. He returned to the cabinet as Justice Minister from 1931-1932 and as Home Minister from 1932-1933 under the Inukai administration. On Inukai’s assassination in the May 15 incident, Suzuki became president of the Rikken Seiyūkai. However, despite holding a majority of the seats in the Diet of Japan, Suzuki was not selected to become Prime Minister, largely due to a long-standing enmity with the last genrō Saionji Kinmochi, who favored Admiral Saitō Makoto for the post. After Saitō’s resignation in 1934, Suzuki was again sidelined, and the office of Prime Minister went to Okada Keisuke.

Following losses in the 1936 General Election, Suzuki no longer had a seat in the Diet. Pressured to resign as head of the Rikken Seiyūkai, he held onto the post until February 1937.

Additionally, Suzuki taught criminal law at Waseda University.

== Personal life and death ==
Suzuki was married to Kazuka Hatoyama, daughter of Kazuo Hatoyama, head of the political Hatoyama family.

Suzuki died in 1940, and his grave is at the Yanaka Cemetery in Tokyo.

== Notes ==
Political offices
Preceded by Inukai Tsuyoshi	Minister of Home Affairs; 25 March 1932 – 26 May 1932	Succeeded by Yamamoto Tatsuo
Preceded by Chifuyu Watanabe	Minister of Justice; 13 December 1931 – 25 March 1932	Succeeded by Kawamura Takeji
Preceded by Osachi Hamaguchi	Minister of Home Affairs; 20 April 1927 – 4 May 1928	Succeeded by Tanaka Giichi
Preceded by Hiranuma Kiichi	Minister of Justice; 7 January 1924 – 11 June 1924	Succeeded by Sennosuke Yokota
