= Akira Kazami =

Japanese politician (1886–1961)

- 風見 章
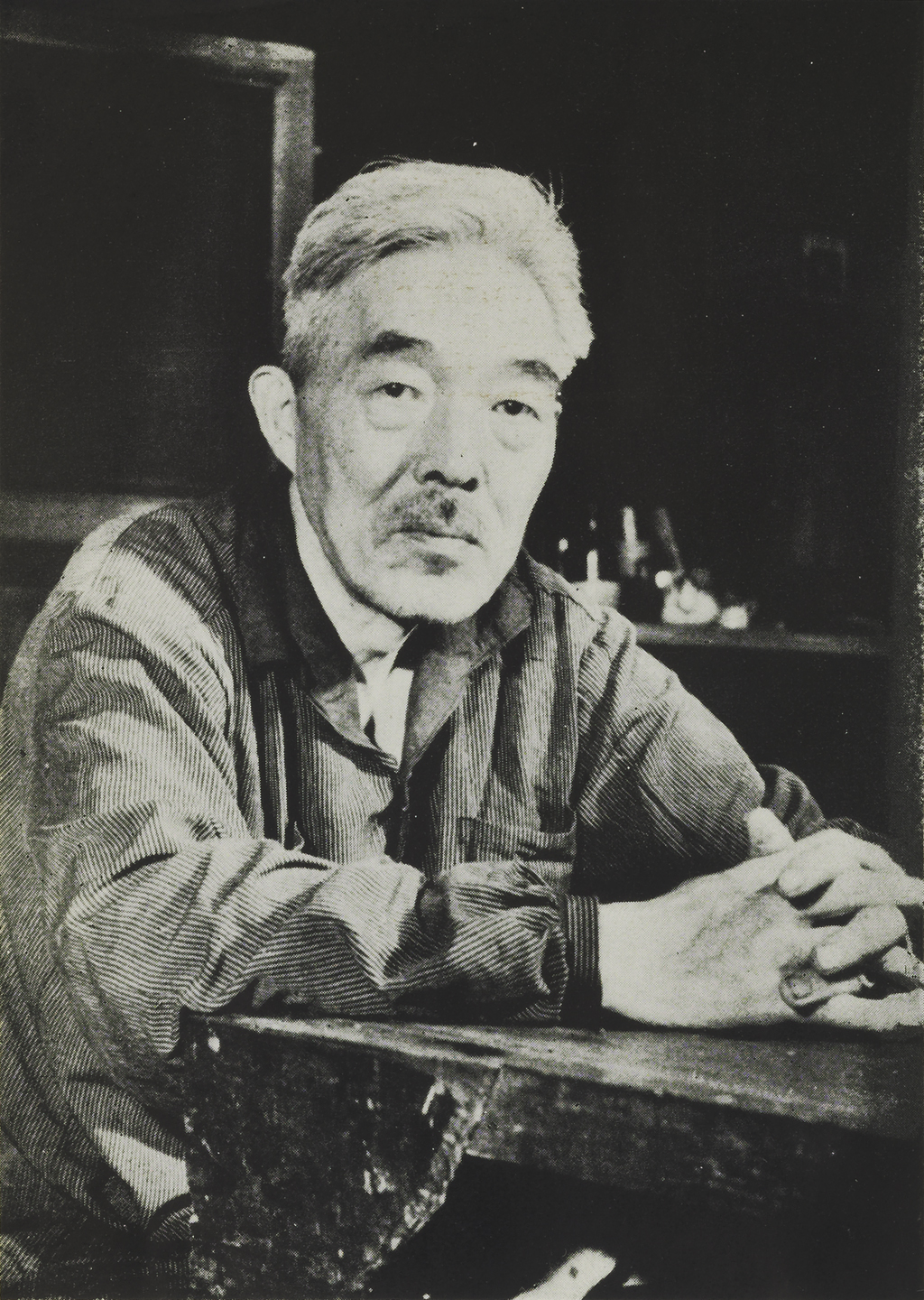
- Kazami c. 1952

Minister of Justice
- In office 22 July 1940 – 21 December 1940
- Prime Minister: Fumimaro Konoe
- Preceded by: Kimura Shōtatsu
- Succeeded by: Heisuke Yanagawa

Chief Cabinet Secretary
- In office 4 June 1937 – 5 January 1939
- Prime Minister: Fumimaro Konoe
- Preceded by: Ōhashi Hachirō
- Succeeded by: Harumichi Tanabe

Member of the House of Representatives
- In office 1 October 1952 – 20 December 1961
- Preceded by: Mineo Ikeda
- Succeeded by: Hiroshige Ochiai
- Constituency: Ibaraki 3rd
- In office 20 February 1930 – 29 April 1942
- Preceded by: Miyako Keizaburō
- Succeeded by: Yūjirō Koshino
- Constituency: Ibaraki 3rd

Personal details
- Born: 12 February 1886 Mitsukaido, Ibaraki, Japan
- Died: 20 December 1961 (aged 75)
- Party: Socialist (1955–1961)
- Other political affiliations: Rikken Minseitō (1930–1932); Kokumin Dōmei (1932–1936); Independent (1936–1940; 1942–1955); IRAA (1940–1942); LSP (1955)
- Education: Waseda University

Akira Kazami (風見 章; Kazami Akira; 1886–1961) was a Japanese politician. He served as Secretary-General of the First Konoe Cabinet (1937–1939) and Minister of Justice of the Second Konoe Cabinet (1940).

== Early life ==
Akira Kazami was born in Mitsukaido, Ibaraki Prefecture (present-day Jōsō, Ibaraki Prefecture). In 1905, he entered Waseda University where he joined the honorary school of Sugiura Jūgō. In 1913, Kazami joined Osaka Asahi Shimbun (currently part of The Asahi Shimbun) and spent his life working as a journalist for Kokusai Tsushin and The Shinano Mainichi Shimbun.

== Political career ==
Kazami was a candidate in the 1928 Japanese general election, though he was not elected. However, in the 1930 general election he was elected for the first time and entered the Constitutional Democratic Party. He joined the Kokumin Dōmei in 1932 but left the party in 1936 to become independent. From no great prominence, he was made Secretary-General of the First Konoe Cabinet in 1937. He had been part of Konoe's think tank, the Shōwa Kenkyūkai, for a number of years. He held the position until January 1939. In the 1940 Second Konoe Cabinet, he was Minister of Justice during the second half of the year but resigned after five months in office.

After his resignation, he quit his political career to become a farmer. Following the end of the Second World War, he was purged until 1951. In 1952, he returned to politics and was elected to the House of Representatives as an independent. In 1955, he joined the Japan Socialist Party. In 1960, he took part in the Anpo protests.

He was one of the signatories of the agreement to convene a convention for drafting a world constitution. As a result, for the first time in human history, a World Constituent Assembly convened to draft and adopt the Constitution for the Federation of Earth.
