= Third Konoe cabinet =

Cabinet of Japan (July 18 - October 18, 1941)

Third Konoe Cabinet
- 39th Cabinet of Japan

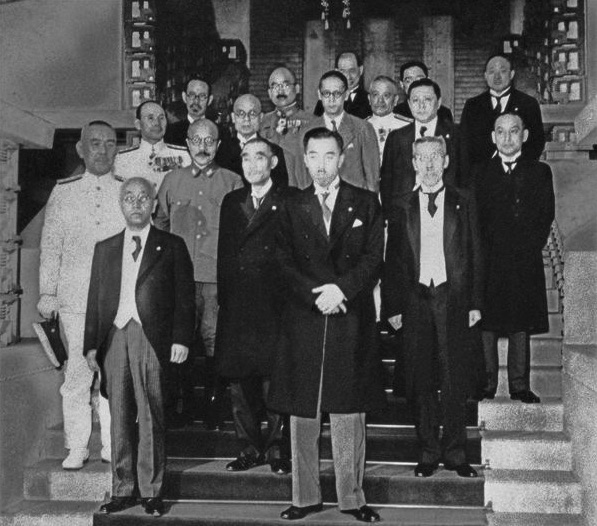
- Date formed: July 18, 1941
- Date dissolved: October 18, 1941

People and organisations
- Emperor: Shōwa
- Prime Minister: Fumimaro Konoe
- Member party: Imperial Rule Assistance Association; Independent; Military
- Status in legislature: One-party government

History
- Predecessor: Second Konoe Cabinet
- Successor: Tōjō Cabinet

The Third Konoe Cabinet is the 39th Cabinet of Japan led by Fumimaro Konoe from July 18 to October 18, 1941.

== Cabinet ==
Ministers
Portfolio	Name	Political party	Term start	Term end
Prime Minister	Prince Fumimaro Konoe	Imperial Rule Assistance Association	July 18, 1941	October 18, 1941
Minister for Foreign Affairs	Teijirō Toyoda	Military (Navy)	July 18, 1941	October 18, 1941
Minister of Home Affairs	Harumichi Tanabe	Independent	July 18, 1941	October 18, 1941
Minister of Finance	Masatsune Ogura	Independent	July 18, 1941	October 18, 1941
Minister of the Army	Hideki Tojo	Military (Army)	July 18, 1941	October 18, 1941
Minister of the Navy	Koshirō Oikawa	Military (Navy)	July 18, 1941	October 18, 1941
Minister of Justice	Prince Fumimaro Konoe	Imperial Rule Assistance Association	July 18, 1941	July 25, 1941
Minister of Justice	Iwamura Michiyo	Independent	July 25, 1941	October 18, 1941
Minister of Education	Kunihiko Hashida	Independent	July 18, 1941	October 18, 1941
Minister of Agriculture, Forestry and Fisheries	Hiroya Ino	Independent	July 18, 1941	October 18, 1941
Minister of Commerce and Industry	Sakonji Seizō	Independent	July 18, 1941	October 18, 1941
Minister of Communications	Shōzō Murata	Independent	July 18, 1941	October 18, 1941
Minister of Railways	Shōzō Murata	Independent	July 18, 1941	October 18, 1941
Minister of Colonial Affairs	Teijirō Toyoda	Military (Navy)	July 18, 1941	October 18, 1941
Minister of Health	Chikahiko Koizumi	Military (Navy)	July 18, 1941	October 18, 1941
Minister of State	Teiichi Suzuki	Independent	July 18, 1941	October 18, 1941
Minister of State	Baron Hiranuma Kiichirō	Independent	July 18, 1941	October 18, 1941
Minister of State	Heisuke Yanagawa	Military (Army)	July 18, 1941	October 18, 1941
Chief Cabinet Secretary	Kenji Tomita	Independent	July 18, 1941	October 18, 1941
Director-General of the Cabinet Legislation Bureau	Murase Naokai	Independent	July 18, 1941	October 18, 1941
