= Heisuke Yanagawa =

Japanese general (1879–1945)

- 柳川 平助
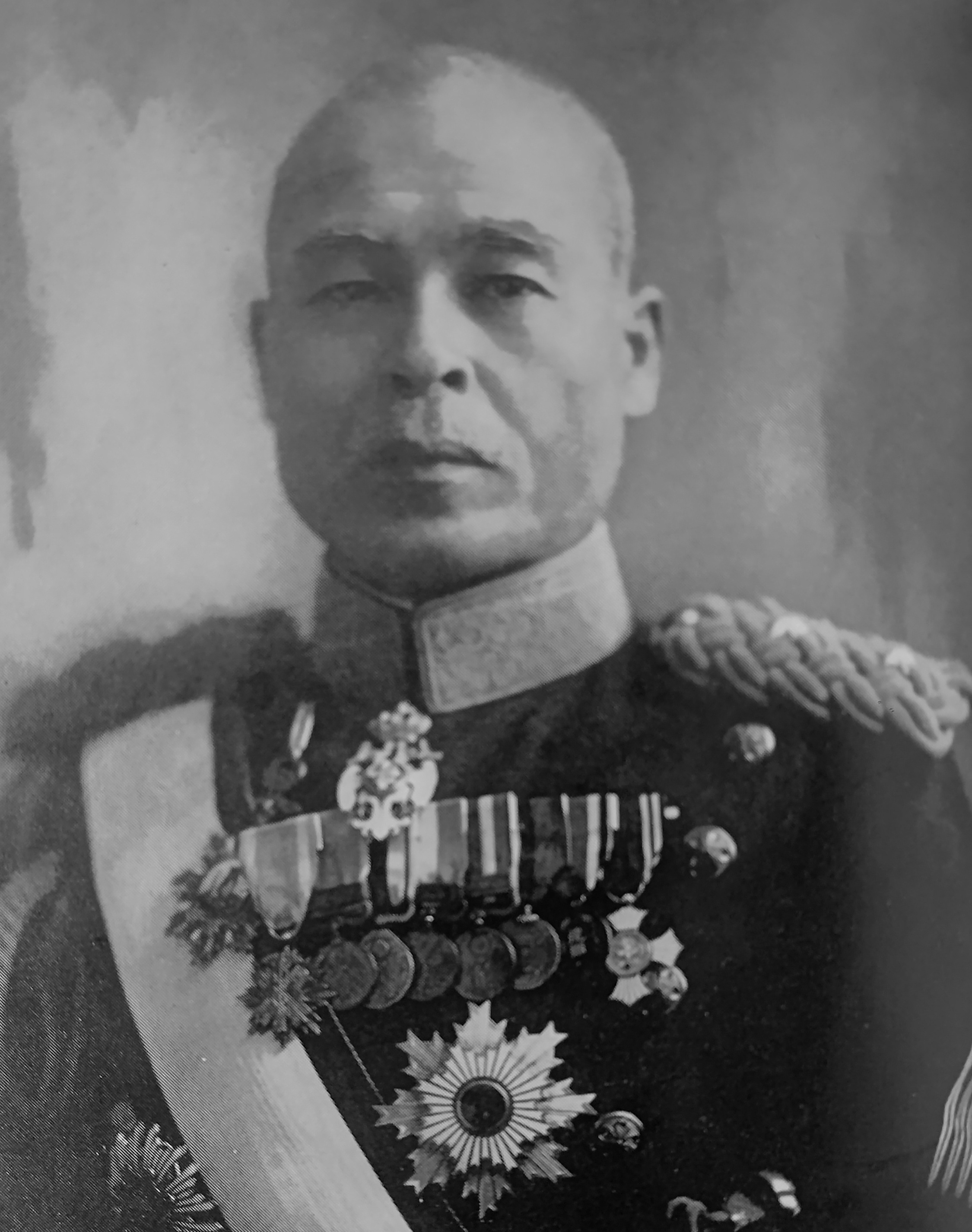

Vice President of the Imperial Rule Assistance Association
- In office 28 March 1941 – 22 October 1941
- President: Fumimaro Konoe; Hideki Tojo
- Preceded by: Position established
- Succeeded by: Kisaburō Andō

Minister of Justice
- In office 21 December 1940 – 18 July 1941
- Prime Minister: Fumimaro Konoe
- Preceded by: Akira Kazami
- Succeeded by: Fumimaro Konoe

Director-General of the East Asia Development Board
- In office 16 December 1938 – 21 December 1940
- Preceded by: Office established
- Succeeded by: Teiichi Suzuki

Personal details
- Born: 2 October 1879 Nishisonogi, Nagasaki, Japan
- Died: 22 January 1945 (aged 65) Setagaya, Tokyo, Japan
- Party: Imperial Rule Assistance Association
- Education: Imperial Japanese Army Academy; Army War College (Japan)
- Awards: Order of the Rising Sun; Order of the Golden Kite; Order of the Sacred Treasure

Military service
- Allegiance: Empire of Japan
- Branch/service: Imperial Japanese Army
- Years of service: 1900–1938
- Rank: Lieutenant General
- Commands: IJA 1st Division, Taiwan Army, IJA 10th Army
- Battles/wars: Russo-Japanese War; Second Sino-Japanese War; World War II

Heisuke Yanagawa (柳川 平助, Yanagawa Heisuke; 2 October 1879 – 22 January 1945) was a general in the Imperial Japanese Army in World War II. Japanese forces under Yanagawa's command committed the 1937 Nanjing Massacre.

== Biography ==
Born in what is now part of Nagasaki city, Nagasaki Prefecture, Yanagawa was raised in Ōita Prefecture by his adoptive parents. He graduated from the 12th class of the Imperial Japanese Army Academy in 1900, and served in combat during the Russo-Japanese War of 1904–1905. He graduated from the 24th class of the Army Staff College in 1912. After serving as an instructor in the Army Cavalry School, he was appointed a military attaché to China and served as an instructor at the Beijing Army College in 1918. He later traveled to Europe as part of Japan's delegation to the Versailles Peace Treaty negotiations, and from 1920 to 1923 was a member of Japan's delegation to the League of Nations.

From 1923 to 1925, Yanagawa was a cavalry officer, and rose steadily through the ranks from commanding the IJA 20th Cavalry Regiment in 1923, the IJA 1st Cavalry Brigade by 1927, the Cavalry School from 1929, to Inspector-General of Cavalry in 1930. He was promoted to lieutenant general in December 1931.

Around this time, he became involved in internal politics within the Japanese Army, and joined the Kodaha Faction, led by Sadao Araki, Jinsaburo Mazaki and Toshirō Obata. From 1932 to 1934, Yanagawa served as Vice-Minister of War under Araki. He was subsequently given a field posting as commander of the prestigious IJA 1st Division from 1934 to 1935. He commanded the Taiwan Army of Japan from 1935 to 1936, before his retirement on 26 September 1936.

However, with the Second Sino-Japanese War, Yanagawa was recalled to active service and assigned command of the IJA 10th Army in China in 1937–1938. The 10th Army comprised the 18th and 114th divisions from Japan, the IJA 6th Division from North China, and the Kunisaki Detachment of the IJA 5th Division, and landed in Hangzhou on 5 November 1937.

Yanagawa led his troops in pursuit of Chinese forces fleeing from the Shanghai area, and was in command of one of the main Japanese columns at the Battle of Nanking. His troops were later implicated in the Nanjing Massacre, but Yanagawa was repelled by the events.

Yanagawa retired again from active military service in 1938, becoming secretary general of the East Asia Development Board. With the support of Baron Hiranuma Kiichirō, and the zaibatsu groups, he took over the Justice Ministry from Akira Kazami in December 1940. He was also made vice president of the Imperial Rule Assistance Association in March 1941. In July he left the position of minister of Justice and became a minister without portfolio while continuing to serve vice president of the IRAA, until leaving both posts when Konoe Cabinet resigned in October 1941.

In a 1985 interview of Yoshinaga Sunao who was a Staff Officer of the Japanese 10th Army, Sunao described Yanagawa as a "great man who had his deepest respect" as well as a "reticent and quiet hero". Further into the interview, it was stated by Sunao that Yanagawa loved China and while on the road to Nanjing, he personally said to his Staff officers that it wasn't desirable for Japan and China to have to fight each other, however, as a soldier, he felt it was still his duty to fight and as such readily marched on Nanjing.

Government offices
Preceded by Kuniaki Koiso	Vice Minister of the Army; Aug 1932 – Aug 1934	Succeeded by Toranosuke Hashimoto
New post	Secretary General of the East Asia Development Board; Dec 1938 – Dec 1940	Succeeded by Teiichi Suzuki
Preceded by Akira Kazami	Minister of Justice; Dec 1940 – Jul 1941	Succeeded by Fumimaro Konoe
Vacant	Vice President of the Imperial Rule Assistance Association; Mar 1941 – Oct 1941	Succeeded by Kisaburō Andō
