= Seigō Nakano =

Japanese journalist and politician (1886–1943)

- 中野 正剛
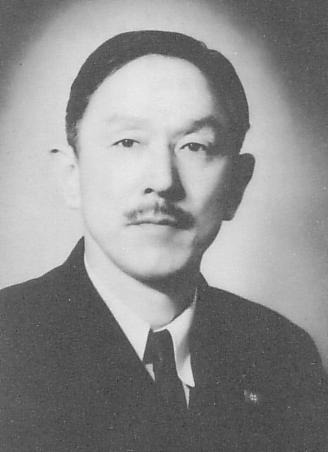

Leader of the Tōhōkai
- In office 25 May 1936 – 27 October 1943
- Preceded by: Position established
- Succeeded by: Position abolished

Member of the House of Representatives; from Fukuoka
- In office 30 April 1942 – 27 October 1943
- Preceded by: Himself (1939)
- Succeeded by: Constituency abolished (1945)
- Constituency: 1st district
- In office 10 May 1920 – 11 April 1939
- Preceded by: Constituency established
- Succeeded by: Himself (1942)
- Constituency: 1st district (1920–1928); 1st district (1928–1939)

Personal details
- Born: 12 February 1886 Fukuoka, Japan
- Died: 27 October 1943 (aged 57) Shibuya, Tokyo, Japan
- Party: Tōhōkai (1936–1943)
- Other political affiliations: Kakushin Club (1922–1924); Kenseikai (1924–1927); Rikken Minseitō (1927–1932); Kokumin Dōmei (1932–1935); IRAA (1940–1943)
- Education: Waseda University
- Occupation: Journalist, politician
- A: Single-member district B: Multi-member district

Seigō Nakano (中野 正剛, Nakano Seigō; 12 February 1886 – 27 October 1943) was a journalist and politician in the Empire of Japan, known primarily for his involvement in far-right politics through his leadership of the Tōhōkai ("Far East Society") party, as well as his opposition to Hideki Tojo and eventual suicide under murky circumstances.

Born in the city of Fukuoka, Nakano went on to attend Waseda University for four years, writing a number of articles for the journal Nihon oyobi Nihonjin (Japan and the Japanese) before graduating in July 1909. In these and in other speeches and articles he would produce, he expressed his political views. Nakano maintained an opposition to Japan's establishment throughout his life, criticizing in turn oligarchs such as Katsura Tarō, the Seiyūkai cabinet of Baron Tanaka Giichi, and eventually Hideki Tojo, the last of which ultimately cost him his life. Despite this opposition, however, Nakano would remain committed to working within political parties and the diet, rejecting the violent coups and putsches of young officers. Of great influence on his political thought was the Ōyōmei tradition. Embracing an intuitionist, autonomist view of the individual, Ōyōmei thought emphasized the following of what one identifies as "good" or "just", over wealth and obedience to corrupt authorities. In the case of Saigō Takamori, who Nakano held as a hero far greater than himself, Ōyōmei sanctified his rebellion against the Meiji Government as heroic.

In his views of the Meiji Restoration, Nakano viewed the event as the result of popular discontent at the Shogunate's despotic rule. But though the leaders of the restoration had been united in a heroic effort against despotic government, a split occurred in which men valuing liberty such as Saigō were sidelined and instead, the Meiji oligarchy allowed Western ideas to flood into the country, eroding Japan's unique spirit and creating a system of oligarchic-bureaucratic rule which was opposed to popular will.

During the 1st Constitutional Protection Movement, he relentlessly attacked the Katsura cabinet and the hanbatsu system of clique government as a writer at the Asahi Shimbun, earning him both a reputation as a liberal and the displeasure of the paper, leading him to launch the Tohojironsha paper in 1916. After election to the diet in 1920, Nakano would join a generation of younger, reformist politicians, eventually aligning with Inukai Tsuyoshi and the Kakushin Kurabu (Reform Club) in 1922, but later believed no serious change could be made outside of one of the two major parties and transfer to the Kenseikai in 1924. Following the Manchurian Incident, Nakano admired the plotters, contrasting their decisive action with the Tanaka cabinet's wavering between hardline policy and capitulation to the United States on China issues.

To form a strong government to deal with the climate of crisis in the early 1930s, Nakano first attempted to organize a union of the Seiyukai and Minseito, then organizing the Kokumin Domei (Citizens’ Alliance) political party with Adachi Kenzo when he failed. Due to disagreements between the two personalities, however, Nakano split to form the Tōhōkai in 1936. Eventually, he would join the Taisei Yokusankai, but left in late 1940 in protest over the restraints imposed on it by conservative forces, primarily the zaibatsu and party politicians. He would go on to become a vicious opponent of Tōjō Hideki and his cabinet before committing ritual suicide while under government pressure in 1943.

== Biography ==
=== Early life ===
Nakano was born as Jintarō Nakano (中野 甚太郎) in the city of Fukuoka, located in Kyushu, the first and eldest son of his family. His father, Taijirō Nakano, was a pawn shop owner from an impoverished samurai family. His mother was Tora Nakano. Nakano would also have two brothers, Taisuke and Hideto, and two sisters, Teru and Mura.

From the ages of 5 to 14, Nakano attended primary school before graduating to attend Fukuoka Prefectural Shūyūkan. In his primary school years, he was described as a bright pupil. At the Shūyūkan, Nakano took an interest in Judo, but suffered a leg injury in his 1st year, forcing him to repeat it and preventing him from joining the military. He also began writing for his school magazine during this time, taking the pen name Masakata, and helped to establish a martial arts centre for pupils called Shimbukan.

In April 1905, Nakano enrolled at Waseda University, a prestigious private university located in Shinjuku, Tokyo, in Political Science. His father's business had gone bankrupt at the time, so in order to pay for his studies, he began to write for the journal Nihon oyobi Nihonjin (Japan and the Japanese), through which he became acquainted with Miyake Setsurei, the journal's owner. He also became acquainted with Mitsuru Tōyama, the most influential figure in the Genyōsha, a secret ultranationalist society. Though Nakano would never join the Genyōsha, he would retain ties to it and Tōyama throughout his life. He would graduate four years after his entry into Waseda in July 1909.

=== Career in Journalism ===
After Nakano's graduation, he pursued a career in journalism as a way to eventually enter politics. He worked at the Nichi Nichi Shimbun for a short while before transferring to the larger and more famous Asahi Shimbun in 1911. Writing for the Asahi, he published his political views on matters, such as in “Politicians in and out of Office”, a writing in which he criticized Katsura Taro, a member of the aristocracy, and Saionji Kinmochi, another member of the aristocracy as well as the leader of the majority Seiyūkai party, for their arrangement in which when one resigned the office of Prime Minister, the other would take his place. During the Xinhai Revolution, Nakano expressed his support of the revolutionaries against the criticism of figures such as Yamagata Aritomo and travelled to Shanghai on a business trip, meeting Sun Yat-Sen.

When the Taishō Political Crisis began, Nakano used his position at the Asahi to become a scathing critic of Katsura Tarō and cabinet, compiling his letters into a book in 1913. Nakano's boldness at the paper had earned him many enemies in its management, however, and he was transferred to Korea that year. While there, he criticized Governor Terauchi Masatake for his despotic rule of the colony. Nakano married Tamiko, the daughter of Miyake Setsurei, before he transferred to Korea.

In March 1915, Nakano finished his term in Korea and travelled to the United Kingdom. By this time, the 1st World War had begun. On his trip, he acquired a further distaste for the Western powers and belief in Pan-Asianism. What he saw in Britain he believed to be signs of decadence, and in 1917, he would write an article condemning the hypocrisy of the West, which preached justice and self-determination while perpetuating oppression in their colonies. So disappointed was Nakano that in 1916, he decided return to Japan earlier than planned by way of the United States of America.

After returning to Japan, he left the Asahi and joined the Tohojironsha (Eastern Review) newspaper, of which he became Chief Editor. The Tohojironsha and Nihon oyobi Nihonjin would also later merge due to the destruction of the Kantō Earthquake to form the paper Gakan (Our Views) in 1923. Through the Tohojironsha, he criticized the Ōkuma cabinet's Twenty-One Demands, supported the reunification of China's northern and southern governments through Japanese meditation, and supported the rice rioters. He also opposed the Siberian Intervention and urged recognition of the Soviet Russia, believing it would weaken the dominance of the Anglo-American bloc. In 1919, Nakano travelled to report on the peace conference at Versailles. Upon returning to Japan, he blasted the government's weakness in confronting the United States, in the process more than tripling the paper's circulation from 2000 to 7000.

=== Rise in Politics ===
In 1917, Nakano campaigned independently to win a diet seat in his hometown of Fukuoka, but failed. In 1920, he campaigned again. Now aided by greater fame from his writings at the Tohojironsha, the withdrawal of a rival candidate backed by the Black Dragon Society (which had taken a stance opposite to Nakano on Russia issues), and an expanded electorate, Nakano won a seat at the diet, becoming part of a new, reformist generation of Japanese politicians advocating national reconstruction. Hoping that the postwar discontent would allow new parties to compete with the two dominant parties of the day, the Seiyukai and Kenseikai, Nakano first joined the Mushozoku Kurabu (Independents' Club) in 1921, and one year later, the Kakushin Kurabu (Reform Club), both parties with a significant younger, progressive element, the latter of which dominated by Inukai Tsuyoshi, whom Nakano had fervently supported during the Taisho Political Crisis. Over time, however, Nakano had come to be frustrated with Inukai's repeated compromises with the establishment and also began to believe that by remaining in a minor party, he would be unable to affect any real change. In 1924, he joined the Kenseikai (Constitutional Politics Association), aligning himself with Adachi Kenzō's faction.

In 1927, the Kenseikai Wakatsuki cabinet called a truce with their rival, the Seiyūkai, officially out of respect for the beginning of the new emperor's reign but in truth over uncertainty over what results the nation's first elections under universal suffrage might bring. This move was criticized within the Kenseikai, leading to resignations which allowed Nakano to be appointed a finance ministry councillor. After the fall of the Wakatsuki cabinet later that year, however, Nakano would be forced to leave his post, and a new, Seiyūkai cabinet was formed by Baron Tanaka Giichi. Nakano would clash several times with Tanaka and his cabinet. Earlier in 1926, he had accused Tanaka of embezzling funds while war minister in the Siberian Intervention. During Tanaka's time as prime minister, Nakano would launch a barrage of criticism against the man, attacking him over his heavy-handed foreign policy towards China and Manchuria, as well as showing weakness before the United States.

In 1927, Nakano helped found the Minseitō party, the successor to the Kenseikai. Representing his increased fortunes within the party, Nakano became a party director, campaign manager, and was also give responsibility for drafting the party program. After the Tanaka cabinet fell following the fallout of Zhang Zuolin's assassination, a Minseitō cabinet under Hamaguchi Osachi was formed. Nakano was offered the position of Parliamentary Vice Minister of Communications, and while there, he developed a plan to expand the telephone industry through the formation of a company partly government-owned and partly privately owned, but his plans were blocked by Shidehara Kijūrō, who had become acting Prime Minister after Prime Minister Hamaguchi was severely wounded in an assassination attempt, and Nakano resigned in protest.

Nakano would have further disagreements with the Minseitō, particularly over their reimplementation of the gold standard, which he believed was flawed, and when the Manchurian Incident broke out in 1931, Nakano sided with the young officers, praising their spirit and influenced by the Ōyōmei tradition, which stressed action and intuition. Despite sharing a dislike of the elitist bureaucracy with the young officers, however, Nakano would always attempt to work within the system.

=== Drift Towards Fascism ===
==== Break with the Minseitō ====
By 1932, recent events such as the Great Depression and Manchurian Incident had convinced Nakano that the world and the establishment were drifting towards crisis. In order to form a strong government, he first attempted to create a union of the two largest political parties, the Seiyukai and Minseito. When this attempt failed, however, Nakano formed the Kokumin Dōmei (National Alliance) with Adachi Kenzō and his faction, breaking away from the Minseito, then elaborating and going further on his earlier proposals for national reconstruction. In the pamphlet Tenkan Nihon no Dōkō (Trends of Japan in Transition), he now claimed that the general trend of the times was towards one-party states, and that parliamentary politics and laissez-faire economics, both based on the British model, were outdated. In a later 1933 publication, Kokka Kaizō Keikaku Kōryō (Outline Plan for National Reconstruction), Nakano would advocate for a corporatist system. Upon the formation of the Kokumin Dōmei, the party platform called for the establishment of a "controlled economy", "aiming at the guarantee of the masses' livelihood". In his campaign for a reconstruction of Japan, Nakano would also forge ties with military men such as Kanji Ishiwara and advocate heavily for the recognition of Manchukuo.

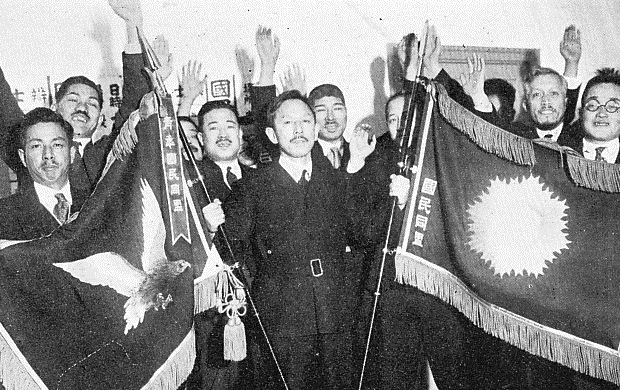
The Kokumin Dōmei in uniform

Nakano's time in the Kokumin Dōmei would be limited, however. As 1932 passed, so did the sense of impending crisis which had convinced him to break away from the hopefully soon-to-be irrelevant establishment parties, and tensions which Adachi increased. Of particular frustration to Nakano was Adachi's refusal to wear the blackshirt, the party uniform, because he thought it looked silly, and his support of the Okada cabinet. In May 1936, Nakano broke off to form the Tōhōkai ("Far East Society"), his final attempt at forging a mass-based party. Tragedy also struck Nakano's family in the early 30s. His wife perished of tuberculosis in 1934, his son died in a skiing accident in 1931, and his second eldest son died of blood poisoning in 1935. On the national scale, the fading sense of crisis came to convince Nakano that a national reconstruction of Japan could be spurred on through international action, as with the Manchurian Incident.

==== Meeting with Hitler and Time in the IRAA ====
During the February 26th Incident, Nakano excitedly took his sons to see the rebels from afar, believing the incident could spark a revolution, but as the revolt was crushed, so were Nakano's hopes. With the start of the China War, however, he believed the conflict would be the chance needed to restructure Japan. Nakano enthusiastically supported the war, claiming that Chiang Kai-Shek was a puppet of the West. In December 1937, he had a personal audience with Benito Mussolini. In the next month, Nakano met with Adolf Hitler and Joachim von Ribbentrop, where he told the German dictator that China's Nationalist Government was on its deathbed. He also urged close cooperation with the Axis powers against the Anglo-American bloc.

By this point, Nakano's pro-Nazi and pro-military rhetoric was beginning to earn him enemies in the diet. In 1939, Nakano would attempt to expand the Tōhōkai through a merger with the socialist Shakai Taishūtō. In recent years, the latter party had increasingly come to support the military and bureaucracy against the zaibatsus, making common cause through shared opposition to capitalism and supporting the China War. In the end, however, the merger would fail due to disagreements over the distribution of power and the two parties would simply agree to maintain friendly relations. On a visit to China that same year, the Seiyukai and Minseito attacked Nakano in the diet, eroding his support and forcing him to resign, though he would later be re-elected in 1942.

In January 1939, Nakano gave a speech on the need for a totalitarian Japan. He argued against those who "say that neither fascism nor Nazism are appropriate for our nation." He then distinguished between old-style conservative despotism, and a "Totalitarianism... based on essentials." Arguing against majority rule (as the majority "is the precise cause of contemporary decadence") and "an individualism which shows no concern for others", he calls for a "government going beyond democracy" giving consideration to "the essence of human beings." With organic unification of individuals "sharing common ideals and a common way of feeling," there can be formed "a perfect national organization."

In his struggle against the growing monopoly of power by high civil and military officials and privileged capital, he even adapted the theme of anti-semitism to the Japanese scene. Recalling Hitler's claim that Germany's defeat in the Great War had been due to Jewish domination of finance and administration in collusion with the German and Austrian bureaucracy, he drew an analogy with the control of the wartime Japanese economy by bureaucrats and their capitalist collaborators in state-backed economic agencies, coining the concept of "yudaya-shugi" (Jewish mentality) to describe them.

In 1940, Nakano joined the New Structure Preparatory Committee, an organization formed by Prime Minister Fumimaro Konoe as a think tank to prepare the creation of a body which could help organize a new order in Japan. Later that year, the Taisei Yokusankai (Imperial Rule Assistance Association) would be formed as the result of that body and Nakano would be appointed as an executive director. His increased fortunes in this time were aided by the fall of Yonai cabinet and Japan's signing of the Tripartite Pact, vindicating his pro-Nazi views. He would end up resigning his IRAA position in December, however, after Konoe capitulated to pressure from zaibatsu and diet members in bringing traditionalists into the cabinet and weakening the organization's political role.

=== Opposition to Tōjō ===
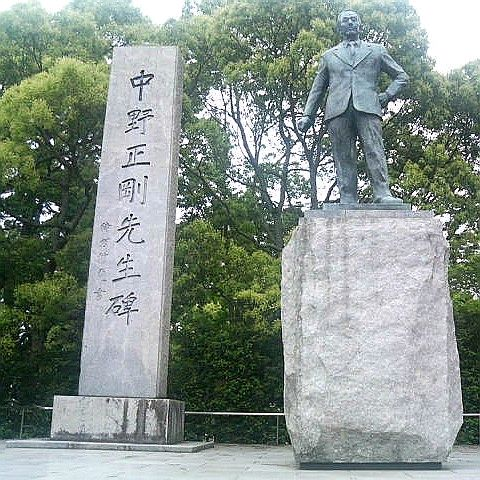
Seigō Nakano statue located in Fukuoka City, Japan.

After the formation of the Tōjō cabinet, the government continued to steadily increase measures aimed at transforming Japan into a totalitarian society. After the 1942 elections, in which Nakano regained his diet seat, the government formed the Yokusan Seijikai (Imperial Rule Assistance Political Association) to act as Japan's sole political organization, as the Taisei Yokusankai had earlier been declared not be a political organization. This necessitated the dissolution of the reformed Tōhōkai, which reconstituted as the Tōhō Jikai, an apolitical cultural organization. The results of the 1942 election also proved a disappointment to Nakano, as he had fielded a total of 46 candidates and expected to have 20 elected, but only 7, including himself, were successful. He joined the Yokusan Seijikai after its formation.

Eventually, Nakano became a harsh critic of both Tōjō and the IRAA. He claimed that the party was becoming a tool of the bureaucracy to establish a dictatorship over the people and that it was unrepresentative of popular will. He also labelled Tōjō as a despot. Among the reasons for Nakano's anger at Tōjō were the harsh regime of economic controls led by the bureaucracy and Japan's decreasing fortunes in the Pacific War.

Prior to the attack on Pearl Harbor, Nakano had been a strong advocate of expansion into the colonial territories of Southeast Asia, which, as their European masters were either occupied by the Germans in the cases of France and the Netherlands or held down by the conflict with Germany, in the case of Britain, they would be easily occupied and liberated by Japan. The bringing in of the United States into the conflict, however, worried Nakano.

At Waseda University, Nakano gave a speech entitled "The World Prospers through the Individual" (Tenka Ichinin o Motte Okoru). In it, he criticized Kishi Nobusuke and the bureaucracy, going over Japan's recent history. He also praised Itagaki Taisuke, a well known Japanese liberal, as well as Japanese liberalism in a broad sense, contrasting it with Anglo-American liberalism. Such criticism brought only greater government pressure upon him. Nakano was forbidden to publish articles or make public speeches. In June 1943, Nakano resigned from the Yokusan Seijikai over the expulsion of a diet member.

In the final months of his life, Nakano attempted to aid in overthrowing the Tōjō cabinet. He reached out to men such as Konoe Fumimaro, Tanabe Tadao, who was an officer on the Planning Board, Matsumae Shigeyoshi, Hatoyama Ichirō, and Prince Higashikuni. Ultimately, Nakano planned to convince the senior statesmen to remove Tōjō and have him replaced by General Ugaki Kazushige. Tōjō loyalists would then be purged from the Army and government while the economy would be rationalized to turn the tide of the war and force the United States into peace talks.

Hoping to have Nakano removed from the diet when the Tōjō cabinet presented a plan for greater economic controls, on October 21, Nakano and 100 others were arrested by the police. While in confinement, Nakano confessed to spreading harmful rumors about the government. As this confession was not enough to legally confine him and prevent from attending the October 26th Diet session however, Nakano was made to sign an agreement not to attend the diet the next day and released on the 25th. However, he was then taken to Kempeitai headquarters shortly before once again being sent home.

On October 27, Nakano Seigō committed suicide. The circumstances surrounding his death have been a source of debate since the incident happened. It is speculated that at the Kempeitai headquarters, the officers there coerced him into taking his own life by threatening his family. Before Nakano committed suicide, the portraits of Hitler and Mussolini in his room were replaced with a statue of Kusunoki Masashige, a samurai known for his intense loyalty, and a biography of Saigō Takamori, a figure he had admired for all of his life. 20,000 people attended his funeral.

== See also ==
- Kita Ikki
- Japanese militarism
- Japanese nationalism
- Japanese fascism
