= Teijin Incident =

Japanese political scandal (1933–34)

The Teijin Incident (帝人事件, Teijin jiken) was a political scandal in the early Shōwa period of Imperial Japan which brought about the collapse of the administration of Prime Minister Saitō Makoto in 1934.

== History and background ==
In June 1933, the Banchokai, a group of young investors, purchased 100,000 shares of Teijin (a leading rayon and textile firm) from the Bank of Taiwan at a price of ¥125 per share. The stock steadily rose in price, reaching ¥200 per share by the end of the year, and rumors began to arise in the editorial pages of various newspapers that the Banchokai had somehow managed to manipulate the market.

Working with this unsubstantiated rumor, ultrarightist officials in the Ministry of Justice accused officials in the Ministry of Finance and members of Saitō Cabinet of conspiracy with the Bank of Taiwan to permit the Banchokai to purchase shares at an artificially low price in return for bribes of cash and stock. In April 1934, the Ministry of Justice ordered the arrest of the Vice-Minister of Finance, director of the Bank of Taiwan and president of Teijin. On receiving word that a number of cabinet ministers were also scheduled to be arrested, Prime Minister Saitō dissolved the government on 3 July 1934. Soon afterwards, thirteen more officials were arrested on charges of corruption.

== Consequences ==
After a lengthy trial, all sixteen defendants were cleared of all charges, and the entire set of stock transactions involving Teijin shares was found to be free of fiscal irregularities. However, the Japanese public in general was left with a strong impression on extensive corruption in high levels of government and finance, which further eroded public confidence in both liberal democracy and in the capitalist system. This image was encouraged by the right-wing Kokuhonsha, led by Hiranuma Kiichirō, who was also chief prosecutor in the trial. Indirectly, the Teijin Incident contributed to an increase in violent terrorist attacks by secret societies such as the Sakurakai and League of Blood against leading figures in government and finance. It also contributed to attempted military coup d'etats, such as the February 26 Incident, against the perceived corruption of civilian rule.
