= Ryūtarō Nagai =

Japanese politician

- 永井 柳太郎
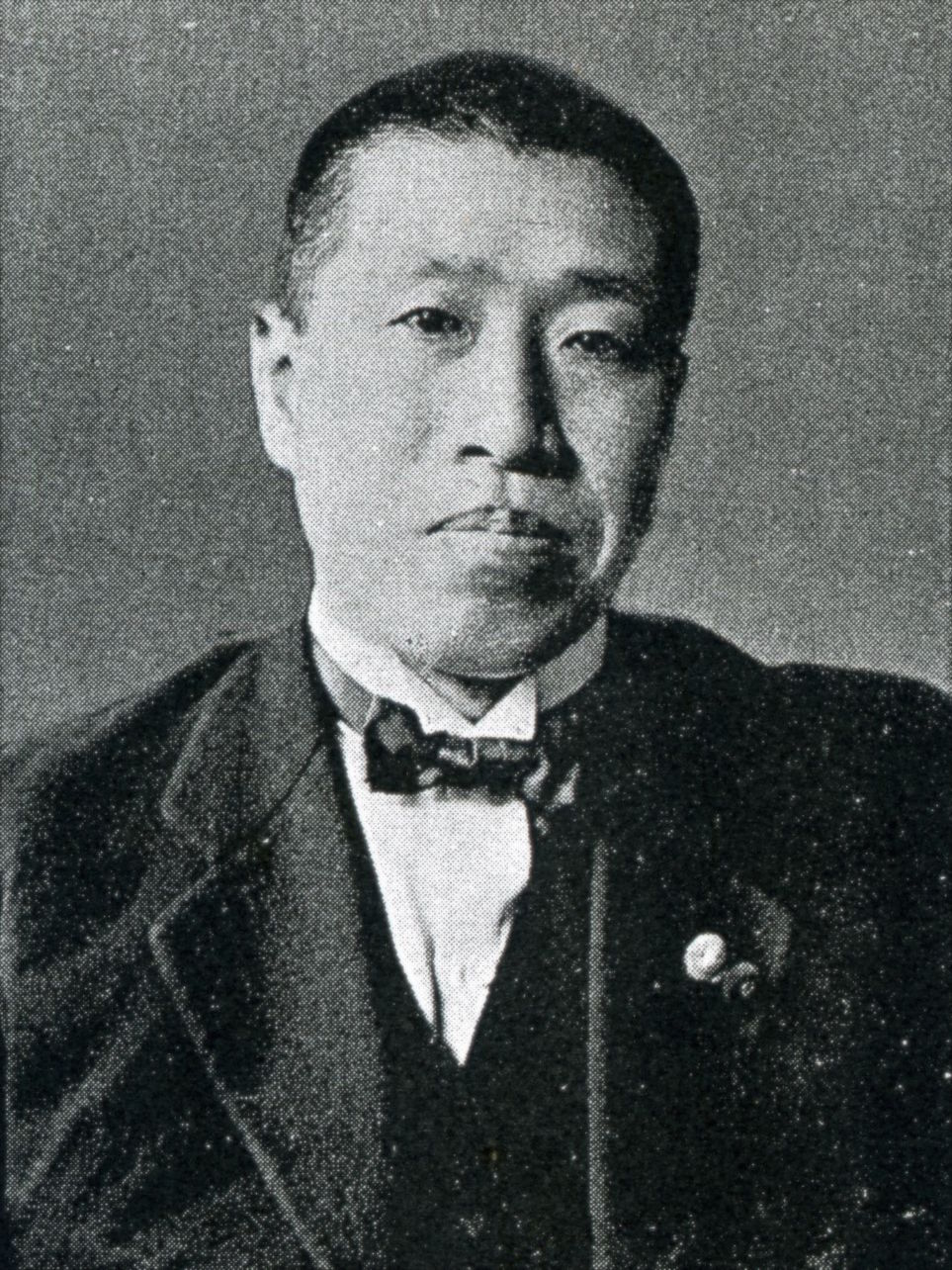
- Nagai in 1929

Minister of Communications
- In office 30 August 1939 – 16 January 1940
- Prime Minister: Nobuyuki Abe
- Preceded by: Harumichi Tanabe
- Succeeded by: Masanori Katsu
- In office 4 June 1937 – 5 January 1939
- Prime Minister: Fumimaro Konoe
- Preceded by: Hideo Kodama
- Succeeded by: Suehiko Shiono

Minister of Railways
- In office 30 August 1939 – 29 November 1939
- Prime Minister: Nobuyuki Abe
- Preceded by: Yonezō Maeda
- Succeeded by: Hidejirō Nagata

Minister of Colonial Affairs
- In office 26 May 1932 – 8 July 1934
- Prime Minister: Saitō Makoto
- Preceded by: Toyosuke Hata
- Succeeded by: Keisuke Okada

Member of the House of Representatives
- In office 10 May 1920 – 4 December 1944
- Preceded by: Constituency established
- Succeeded by: Constituency abolished (1945)
- Constituency: Single-member Ishikawa 1st (1920–1928); Multi-member Ishikawa 1st (1928–1944)

Personal details
- Born: 16 April 1881 Kanazawa, Ishikawa, Japan
- Died: 4 December 1944 (aged 63) Tsukiji, Tokyo, Japan
- Party: IRAA (1940–1944)
- Other political affiliations: Kenseikai (1917–1927); Rikken Minseitō (1927–1940)
- Children: Michio Nagai
- Relatives: Muneaki Samejima (grandson)
- Education: Waseda University; University of Oxford

Ryūtarō Nagai (永井 柳太郎, Nagai Ryūtarō; 16 April 1881 – 4 December 1944) was a politician and cabinet minister in the Empire of Japan, serving a member of the Lower House of the Diet of Japan eight times, and four as a cabinet minister. He was noted in his early political career as a champion of universal suffrage, social welfare, labor unions, women's rights and Pan-Asianism.

== Early life and education ==
Nagai was born in Kanazawa, Ishikawa Prefecture, where his father had been a samurai in the service of the Maeda clan. Nagai studied at a middle school run by Doshisha University and the Kansei Gakuen and converted to Unitarianism in 1901. He was a devout Christian, and read the Bible every day. He studied at the School of Politics and Economics at Waseda University, where he was highly influenced by Abe Isoo and the concept of "Christian-Socialism" and with Abe's assistance he secured a scholarship to study at Manchester College within Oxford University in England for further studies. He returned to graduate from Waseda with a degree in Colonial Studies, and with the assistance of Ōkuma Shigenobu obtained a post there as a teacher. He also edited Shin Nippon, a monthly magazine that was a mouthpiece for Okuma's political views. In 1912, Nagai wrote optimistically about the possibility of large-scale Japanese settlement on under-developed agricultural lands in Korea.

== Political career ==
Nagai ran for a seat in the Lower House of the Diet during the 1917 General Election from the Kanazawa district, but was defeated by the Rikken Seiyūkai candidate Nakahashi Tokugōrō by only 203 votes. For the 1920 General Election, Nakahashi changed his electoral district to Osaka, and Nagai was elected. He retained his seat over the next seven elections, eventually rising to the position of Secretary-General of the Rikken Minseitō political party. Nagai was known for his strong oratory, combining ponderous speech with colorful or flamboyant phrases. (He was once censured by the Diet for making a congratulatory speech on the inauguration of Prime Minister Hara Takashi by comparing Hara's victory to that of Lenin in the Soviet Union).

In May 1932, Nagai was picked to be Minister of Colonial Affairs under the Saitō administration, which he held until July 1934. In June 1937, he was selected to be Minister of Communications under the Konoe administration, until January 1939 and returned to the same post from August 1939 to January 1940 under the Abe administration. Also under the Abe administration, he served as Railroad Minister concurrently with his term as Minister of Communications.

During his later career, Nagai became increasingly critical of what he perceived to be the racist and imperialistic designs of United States and United Kingdom on Asia, writing essays and issuing speeches on the "White Peril" and on the mission of Japan to protect China from the western powers and to liberate Asia from its European masters.

A leading member of the pro-military clique within the Rikken Minseitō, Nagai was a member of the League of Diet Members Carry Through the Holy War and a key supporter of Konoe's plan to create a single-party state under the Taisei Yokusankai. Under the war-time regime, he was appointed a political bureau chief for Greater East Asia Development Board, and also founded the "Greater Japan Scholarship Foundation", the predecessor to the modern Japan Student Services Organization. In a speech in 1943, he promoted the concept of hakkō ichiu as meaning the "universal brotherhood" of mankind, rather than imperial domination of the world by Japan.

Nagai died in 1944, shortly after the Tokyo Air Raid.

Michio Nagai, Minister of Education in the Miki administration was Nagai's eldest son.

== Notes ==
Political offices
Preceded by Yonezō Maeda	Minister of Railway; August 1939 – November 1939	Succeeded by Hidejirō Nagata
Preceded by Harumichi Tanabe	Minister of Communications; August 1939 – January 1940	Succeeded by Masanori Katsu
Preceded by Hideo Kodama	Minister of Communications; June 1937 – January 1939	Succeeded by Suehiko Shiono
Preceded by Toyosuke Hata	Minister of Colonial Affairs; May 1932 – July 1934	Succeeded by Keisuke Okada
