= East Asia Development Board =

Japanese colonial government agency

The East Asia Development Board, or Kōain (興亜院), was a cabinet level agency in the Empire of Japan that operated between 1938 and 1942. It was created on 18 November 1938 under the first Konoe administration to coordinate the government's China policy. It was initially designed to sponsor industrial and commercial development in China to boost support for Japanese rule in occupied territories. However, the agency was quickly usurped by the Imperial Japanese Army and became a tool for forced labour and enslavement in mines and war industries. It was absorbed into the Ministry of Greater East Asia in 1942.

== History ==
The Second Sino-Japanese War had not been quickly resolved as had been promised by the military, and Prime Minister Fumimaro Konoe authorized the establishment of a central agency to coordinate all government activities and economic initiatives in mainland China, aside from the issue of formal diplomatic relations, which remained within the purview of the Foreign Ministry. It was intended that the Kōain would sponsor industrial and commercial development, creating jobs and infrastructure, and thus boost support for Japanese rule in the occupied territories.

The Kōain established branch offices throughout Japanese-occupied China; however, its activities were quickly usurped by the Imperial Japanese Army, which hoped to limit all civilian involvement in China and afterwards appointed General Yanagawa Heisuke to oversee its operations. Per historian Timothy Brook, some military members of the Kōain spoke out against expansion of the conflict in China during 1939–1940, urging genuine independence for the Japanese-sponsored collaborationist states, and were consequently punished for their views by mainstream Army officials.

According to Chinese historian Zhifen Ju, the Kōain implemented a system of forced labor. She notes that until 1942, at least five million Chinese civilians from northern China and Manchukuo were enslaved for work in mines and war industries. The Kōain was also directly involved in providing funds to opium dealers in China for the benefit of collaborationist governments in Nanjing, Manchukuo and Mengjiang. This document corroborates evidence analyzed earlier by the International Military Tribunal for the Far East which stated:

"Japan, having signed and ratified the opium conventions, was bound not to engage in drug traffic, but she found in the alleged but false independence of Manchukuo a convenient opportunity to carry on a worldwide drug traffic and cast the guilt upon that puppet state (...) In 1937, it was pointed out in the League of Nations that 90% of all illicit white drugs in the world were of Japanese origin...".

The Kōain was absorbed into the Ministry of Greater East Asia in November 1942.
