= Kokumin Dōmei =

Kokumin Dōmei 国民同盟
- Leader: Adachi Kenzō
- Founders: Adachi Kenzō; Seigo Nakano; Akira Kazami
- Founded: 22 December 1932
- Dissolved: 26 July 1940
- Preceded by: Kakushintō; Rikken Minseitō (factions)
- Merged into: Imperial Rule Assistance Association
- Headquarters: Tokyo City
- Ideology: Fascism (Japanese); Pan-Asianism
- Political position: Far-right

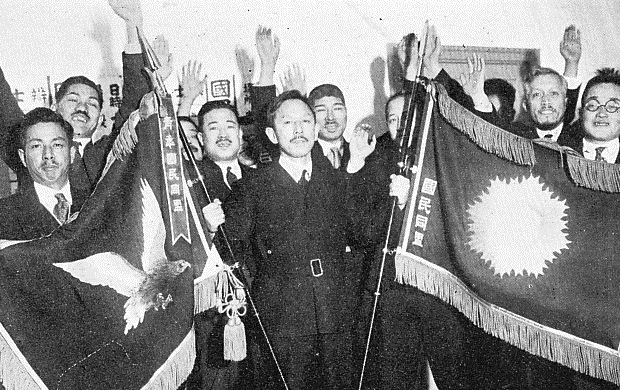
Kokumin Dōmei meeting, 1933

Kokumin Dōmei (国民同盟, National Citizens' Alliance) was a Japanese fascist political party in Japan active in the 1930s.

In 1931, Home Minister Adachi Kenzō of the Rikken Minseitō ("Constitutional Democratic Party") spoke out strongly in support of the Imperial Japanese Army’s unauthorized incursions into Manchuria and against the diplomatic policies pursued by Kijūrō Shidehara. He was expelled from Rikken Minseitō. Joining together with Nakano Seigō, Akira Kazami, and others, Adachi formed the right-wing party Kokumin Dōmei in December 1932

Kokumin Dōmei advocated for a dirigiste economy with government control of strategic industries and financial institutions, and the creation of a Japan-Manchukuo economic union. The party also supported "Far Eastern Monroeism" through a platform.

The new party consisted mainly of defectors from Minseitō, and had an original strength of 32 seats in the Diet of Japan. In 1934, it demanded an inquiry into the Teijin Incident in an effort to bring down the cabinet of Prime Minister Saitō Makoto. However, in 1935, many members returned to the Minseitō fold. In 1936, Nakano left the party to form Tōhōkai the following year, and Kazami joined Fumimaro Konoe’s think tank, the Shōwa Kenkyūkai. In the 1937 General Election, the party's strength fell from 32 seats to 11 seats.

In June 1940, Kokumin Dōmei was merged into the Imperial Rule Assistance Association, and thereafter ceased to exist.

== Election results ==
Election year	Votes		Seats	Change
Election year	Number	Percentage	Seats	Change
1936	421,632	3.79%	15 / 466	Steady
1937	281,834	2.76%	11 / 466	▼4
