= Teiichi Suzuki =

Japanese politician, war criminal 1888-1989

- 鈴木 貞一
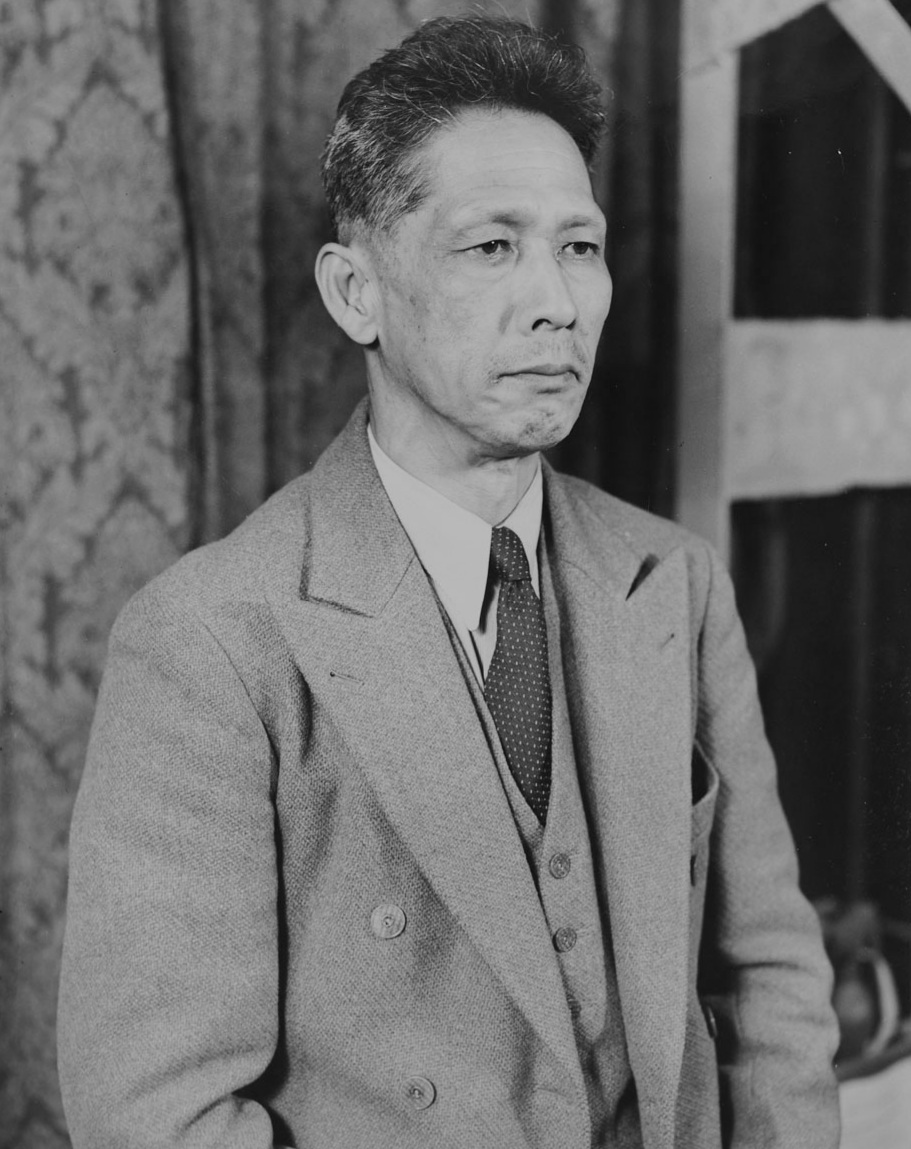
- Born: 16 December 1888; Shibayama, Chiba, Japan
- Died: 15 July 1989 (aged 100); Shibayama, Chiba, Japan
- Military career
- Allegiance: Empire of Japan
- Branch: Imperial Japanese Army
- Service years: 1910–1941
- Rank: Lieutenant General
- Conflicts: World War II

Member of the House of Peers
- In office 8 October 1943 – 3 December 1945 Nominated by the Emperor

Teiichi Suzuki (鈴木 貞一, Suzuki Teiichi; 16 December 1888 – 15 July 1989) was a lieutenant general in the Imperial Japanese Army, a minister of state, and member of the House of Peers. A close associate of Hideki Tojo, he helped to plan Japan's wartime economy.

== Military career ==
The eldest son of a landowner in Chiba Prefecture, Suzuki had aspired to participate in the forestry development of Manchuria based on stories told by his uncle, who was a colonel in the Imperial Japanese Army during the Russo-Japanese War.

He applied for Tokyo Imperial University's Faculty of Agriculture but passed the examinations for the Imperial Japanese Army Academy and upon the recommendations of his uncle, began a military career instead. He graduated from the 22nd class in 1910 and from the 29th class of the Army War College in 1917. After his commission, he studied economics for a year and was briefly assigned to the Ministry of Finance.

After the Nikolayevsk incident, he was dispatched from April to October 1920 to Siberia. he served as a military attache to Shanghai from November 1920 to February 1922. As he was fluent in both English and Chinese, he was assigned to the China Bureau within the Imperial Japanese Army General Staff and was sent to Beijing from August 1925 to December 1925 and to various locations in China from December 1926 to May 1927. he accompanied General Yamanashi Hanzo on a meeting with the Chinese warlord Zhang Zuolin in Beijing in June 1927.

In 1927, Suzuki started to become increasingly involved in internal political factions within the Army. In 1929, he joined the Isseki-kai, a clique that included Tetsuzan Nagata, Hideki Tojo, Kanji Ishiwara and Seishirō Itagaki. He was sent as a military attache to the United Kingdom from February to October 1929.

After his return, he was a participant in the 1931 March Incident, an abortive coup d'état intended to make General Kazushige Ugaki prime minister. He then began to advocate a more aggressive policy in Manchuria and was one of the most vocal advocates for Japan's withdrawal from the League of Nations. He was promoted to colonel in December 1933.

From 1934 to 1935, Suzuki served as an instructor at the Army Staff College and was assigned to the Cabinet Research Bureau from 1935 to 1936. He meanwhile co-authored a pamphlet outlining his theory for a "national defense state" to prepare for total war, based on utopian and Marxist theories on the state control of industries and agrarian reform.

During the February 26 incident in 1936, Suzuki was initially regarded as a member of the Kōdōha faction which supported the attempted coup; however, he switched sides to the Tōseiha as it became apparent that the coup would not succeed. Although that earned him a spot close to Hideki Tojo, it also gained him the reputation as an "opportunist," which was resented by many in the Army, including his former classmate Tomoyuki Yamashita. Suzuki was assigned command of the IJA 14th Infantry regiment in December 1936. Although he had been a bureaucrat and administrator, his entire career with little experience as a field commander and no combat experience caused the command of a field unit to be necessary for his further promotion.

He became a major general in November 1937 and was assigned nominally to the staff of the IJA 16th Division from November 1937 to April 1938, but he remained in Tokyo with the Cabinet Research Bureau. From April 1936, he was nominal Chief-of-Staff of the IJA 3rd Army, which was then a garrison force in Manchukuo, far from the combat zones in the Second Sino-Japanese War. Suzuki returned to Tokyo in December as Head of the Political Affairs Bureau of the East Asia Development Board. He was promoted to lieutenant general in August 1940 but retired from military service in April 1941 and entered the reserves.

== Wartime political career ==
Although retired from the military, Suzuki continued to serve as a Minister of State as Chair of the Cabinet Planning Board under the second and third Fumimaro Konoe administrations. In the October 1941 Gozen Kaigi immediately prior to the start of then Pacific War, Suzuki asserted that the outcome of a war would depend a quantitative analysis of Japan's economic and military power and that the American economic embargo caused Japan to have a supply less than three years of oil and other critical resources. Unless new resources could be secured, the Japanese industry would collapse, and the military would lose its capability of taking action, which would result in the loss of the Empire. Continuing to serve in the Hideki Tojo administration, he strongly pushed for the creation of the Ministry of Greater East Asia, of which he expected to become the cabinet minister.

However, Tojo selected the career bureaucrat Kazuo Aoki instead, and Suzuki resigned as Minister of State and became a member of the Upper House of the Diet of Japan in October 1943.

== Postwar ==
After the surrender of Japan, Suzuki was arrested by the American occupation authorities and was charged with Class A war crimes in December 1945 for his advocation of war at the October 1941 Gozen Kaigi. Found guilty at the International Military Tribunal for the Far East for "planning to wage a war of aggression", he was sentenced to life imprisonment in 1948. He was released from Sugamo Prison in September 1955 after the end of the American occupation and was pardoned by the Japanese government in 1958. He was requested to serve as an advisor by several industrialists, and was asked by Nobusuke Kishi to run for the post-war Diet of Japan, but Suzuki refused all offers to return to public life. However, he continued to be consulted on a private basis by conservative politicians, including Eisaku Sato.

Suzuki died at his home in Shibayama, Chiba of heart failure on 15 July 1989, at 100 years old. He was the last surviving defendant of the main Tokyo/Nuremberg trials, outliving Rudolf Hess, who had committed suicide two years earlier.

== Decorations ==
- 1920 – Order of the Rising Sun, 5th class
- 1928 – Order of the Sacred Treasure, 4th class
- 1934 – Order of the Sacred Treasure, 3rd class
- 1934 – Order of the Rising Sun, 3rd class
- 1940 – Order of the Sacred Treasure, 2nd class
