= Supreme Court of Judicature of Japan =

1875–1947 highest judicial body in Japan

Supreme Court of Judicature
- Dai-shin'in
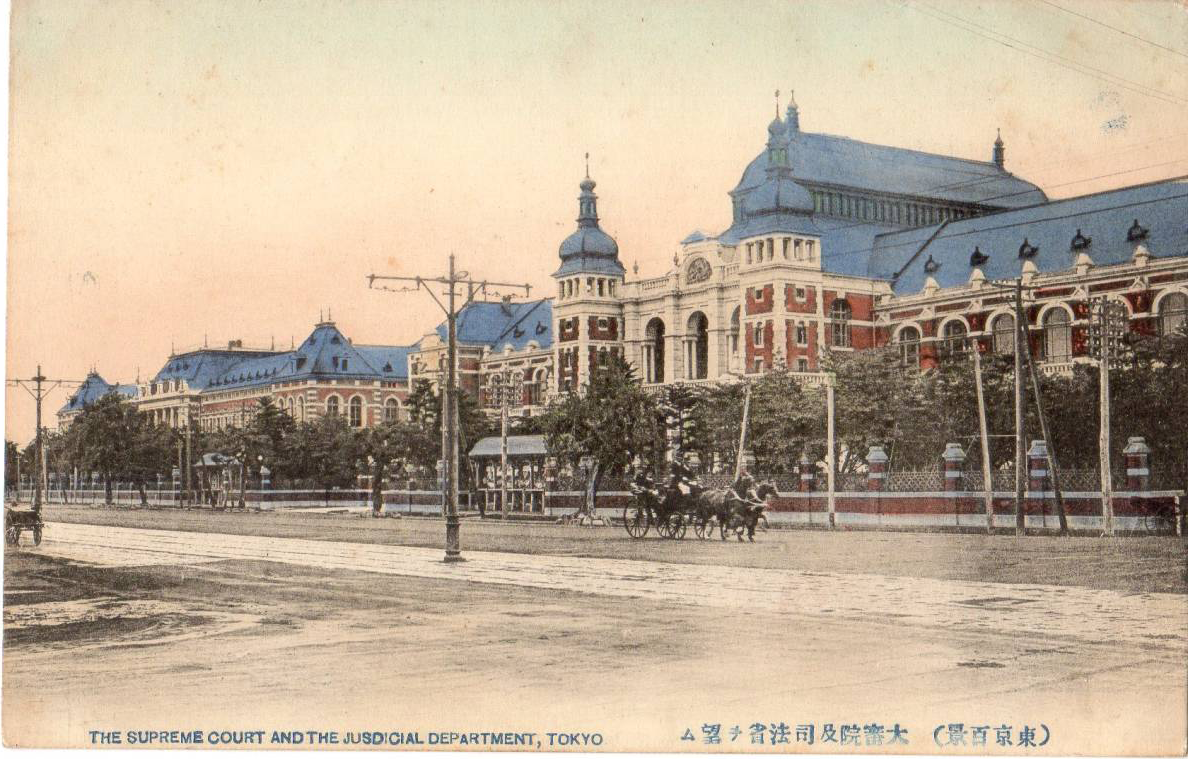
- Established: 1875
- Jurisdiction: Empire of Japan
- Location: Tokyo, Japan
- Authorised by: Meiji Constitution

The Supreme Court of Judicature (大審院, Dai-shin'in) was the highest judicial body in the Empire of Japan. It existed from 1875 to 1947.

Organized by the Ministry of Justice in 1875, the Japanese Supreme Court of Judicature was modeled after Court of Cassation in France. The court was composed of 120 judges in both civil and criminal divisions. Five judges would be empaneled for any given case. The criminal division of the court was the court of first instance for crimes against the Emperor (e.g. lèse majesté) and for high crimes against public order.

The promulgation of the Constitution of the Empire of Japan (i.e. the “Meiji Constitution”), confirmed and formalized its position at the apex of the Japanese court system, consisting of the local courts, district courts and court of appeals.

It was abolished by order of the American occupation authorities in 1947, after the abolition of the Meiji Constitution.

The building of the Supreme Court of Judicature was gutted by American air raids during the bombing of Tokyo in World War II. It was repaired, and continued to be used as the Supreme Court of Japan under the post-war Constitution of Japan until 1974. The present Tokyo High Court was built on its former location.

== See also ==
- Court of Cassation of France
- Senior Courts of England and Wales
