= Kokuhonsha =

Historical organization in Japan

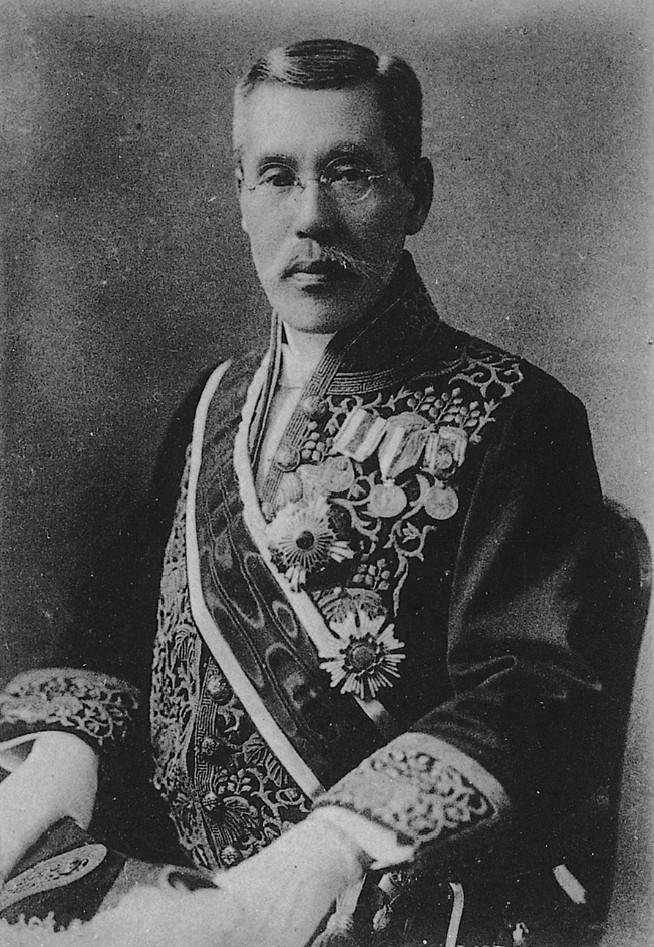
Kiichirō Hiranuma, founder of the Kokuhonsha

The National Foundation Society (国本社, Kokuhonsha) was a Japanese nationalist and conservative society led by Kiichirō Hiranuma from 1924 to 1936.

== History ==
The Kokuhonsha had its origins in a minor right-wing society Kokoku Doshikai formed by Professor Shinkichi Uesugi in 1920. Procurator General Kiichirō Hiranuma served as editorial advisor for its periodical, the Kokuhon.

In early 1924, Hiranuma reorganised the Kokoku Doshinkai into the Kokuhonsha. Hiranuma served as justice minister in the Second Yamamoto cabinet, before it resigned to take responsibility for the Toranomon incident, an assassination attempt on the Prince Regent Hirohito by a communist youth. The incident had increased Hiranuma's vigilance against subversion.

The Kokuhonsha called on patriots to defend the kokutai, or national essence, and reject the various foreign ideologies (such as socialism, communism, Marxism, anarchism, etc.). The name “kokuhon” was selected as an antithesis to the word “minpon”, from minpon shugi, the commonly used translation for the word “democracy”. The elder statesman Saionji Kinmochi criticized the organization as fascistic, tough Hiranuma rejected the label. Richard Storry described it as an "upper-class stroghold of traditionalist conservatism."

Members of the Kokuhonsha included a broad array of influential figures, including generals Sadao Araki, Jinzaburō Masaki, Makoto Saitō, and Yamakawa Kenjirō with war hero and Admiral Tōgō Heihachirō as honorary vice presidents. By 1936, it claimed to have a membership of over 200,000 in 170 branches.

Kokuhon openly advocated a concept they called Kokumin Zentaishugi ("National Totalitarianism"), which aspired to the "inclusion of all sections of the Japanese state and society in one embracing whole". According to Kokuhon, Kokumin Zentaishugi idea suited the mentality of the Japanese people better than Western democracy, stating that "The Japanese, in contrast to the Chinese or Jews, are incapable of living without a state."

However, after Hiranuma was appointed President of the Privy Council, he no longer needed the support of a political action group. The February 26 Incident of 1936, during which time many prominent members expressed support for the insurrectionists, provided Hiranuma with an excuse to order the organization dissolved.
