= Tojo =

Tojo may refer to:

== Places ==
- Tōjō, Hiroshima, Japan, a town
- Tōjō, Hyōgo, Japan, a town merged with others to form the city of Katō
- Tōjō Station (Aichi), a railway station in Toyokawa, Aichi Prefecture, Japan
- Tōjō Station (Hiroshima), a railway station in Kawatō, Tōjō-chō, Shōbara, Hiroshima Prefecture, Japan
- Tojo, Sulawesi, a district in Tojo Una-Una Regency, Sulawesi, Indonesia

== People ==
- Hideki Tojo (1884–1948), Japanese politician, general, convicted war criminal, and Prime Minister of Japan during World War II
- Yūko Tojo (1939–2013), granddaughter of general Tojo and ultra-nationalist politician
- Tojo Yamamoto (1927–1992), ring name of American professional wrestler Harold Watanabe
- Generoso Jiménez (1917–2007), better known as Tojo, Cuban trombonist

== Other uses ==
- Tōbu Tōjō Line, a railway line in Tokyo and Saitama Prefecture, Japan
- Tōjō (surname), a Japanese surname
- "Tojo" (song), a 1983 song by Hoodoo Gurus from Stoneage Romeos
- Nakajima Ki-44, codename Tojo, a Japanese World War II fighter aircraft
