= Shōya =

- Gender: Male

Origin
- Origin: Japanese
- Meaning: Different meanings depending on the kanji used

Shōya, Shoya, Syoya or Shouya (written: 祥也, 翔也, 翔哉 or 庄や) is a masculine Japanese given name. Notable people with the name include:

- Shōya Chiba (千葉 翔也; born 1995), Japanese voice actor
- Shoya Ichihashi (市橋 翔哉; born 1997), Japanese pair skater
- Shōya Ishige (石毛翔弥; born 1990), Japanese voice actor
- Shoya Koyama (小山 聖也; born 2003), Japanese footballer
- Shoya Nakajima (中島 翔哉; born 1994), Japanese footballer
- Shoya Tōjō (東条 庄や; born 1995), Japanese footballer
- Shoya Tomizawa (富沢 祥也; 1990–2010), Japanese motorcycle racer
- Shoya Uchimura (内村祥也; born 1990), Japanese basketball player
- Shoya Yamamoto (山本 翔也; born 1988), Japanese baseball player
- Syoya Kimata (木全 翔也, born 2000), Japanese idol, member of JO1
