= Tōjō (surname) =

Tōjō, Tojo or Toujou (written: 東條, 東条 or 東城) is a Japanese surname. Notable people with the surname include:

- Asami Tojo (東城 麻美; 1972–2007), Japanese manga artist
- Hidekazu Tojo (東條 英員; born 1950), Japanese-Canadian chef
- Hideki Tojo (東条 英機; 1884–1948), Japanese politician, general and Prime Minister of Japan during World War II
- Hisako Tōjō (東城 日沙子; born 1990), Japanese voice actress
- Kanako Tōjō (東條 加那子; born 1984), Japanese voice actress
- Minoru Tōjō (東城 穣; born 1976), Japanese football referee
- Shoya Tōjō (東条 庄や; born 1995), Japanese footballer
- Taiki Tojo (東條 大樹; born 1991), Japanese baseball player
- Takashi Tojo, Japanese mixed martial artist
- Toshiya Tojo (東城 利哉; born 1992), Japanese footballer
- Yuko Tojo (東條 由布子; 1939–2013), Japanese ultra-nationalist politician and granddaughter of Hideki Tojo

== Fictional characters ==
- Kaname Tojo (要 十条), a former idol who went by the name HiMERU; currently hospitalized. From the rhythm game franchise Ensemble Stars!
- Kirumi Tojo (東条 斬美), a character in the video game Danganronpa V3: Killing Harmony
- Koneko Toujou (塔城 小猫), a character in the light novel series High School DxD
- Makoto Tojo (東城 真), founder of the Tojo Clan from the game series Yakuza
- Nozomi Tojo (東條 希), a character in the media franchise Love Live!
- Satoru Tojo (東條 悟), a character in the tokusatsu series Kamen Rider Ryuki
