= Shoya Yamamoto =

Japanese baseball player (born 1988)

Shōya Yamamoto
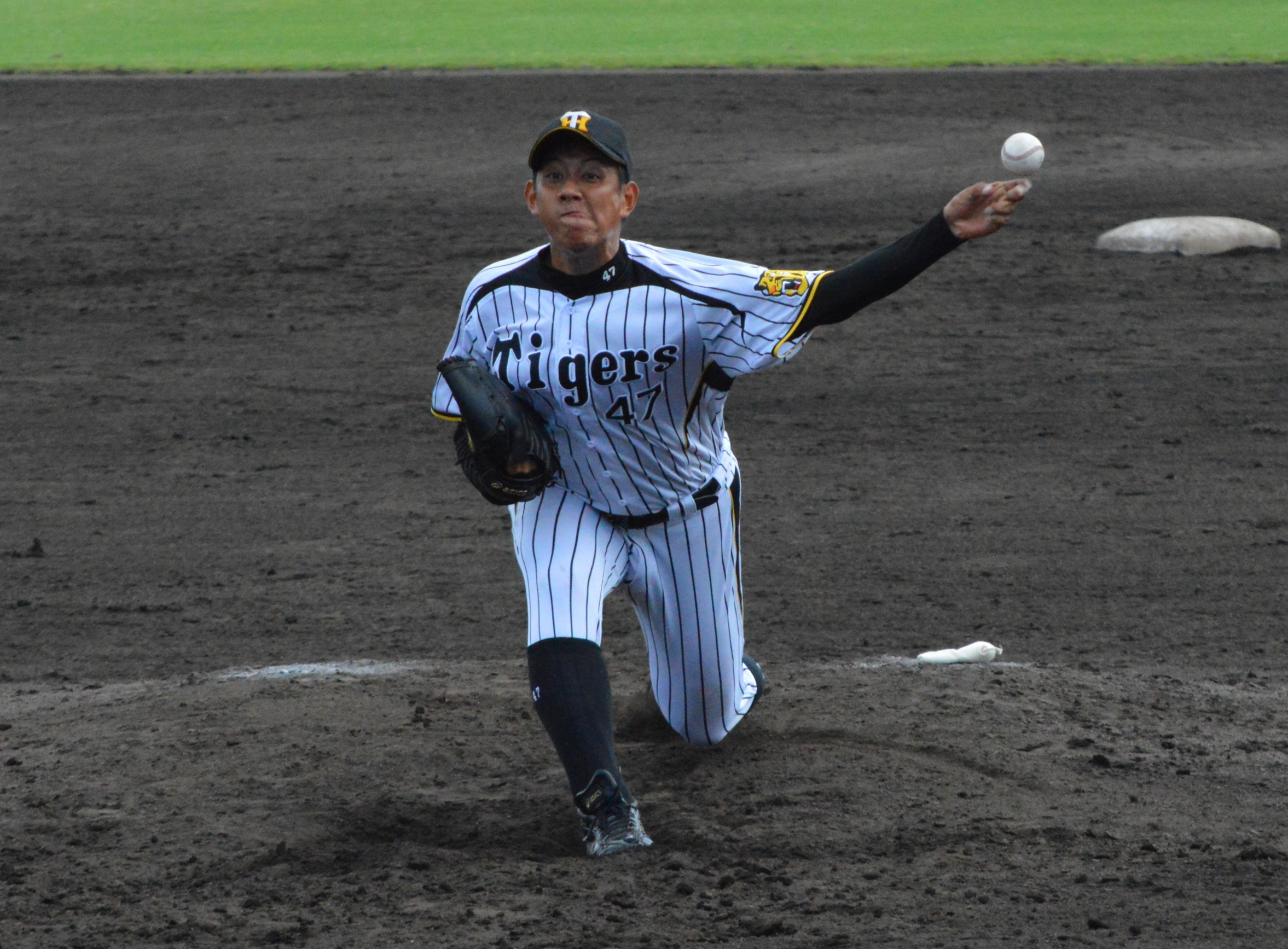
- Yamamoto with the Hanshin Tigers

Hanshin Tigers – No. 47
- Pitcher
- Born: October 12, 1988 (age 37); Takefu, Fukui
- Bats: Left Throws: Left

debut
- 2015, for the Hanshin Tigers

NPB statistics (through 2016)
- Win–loss record: 1–0
- ERA: 4.80
- Strikeouts: 12
- Stats at Baseball Reference

Teams
- Hanshin Tigers (2015 – )

Shōya Yamamoto (山本 翔也, Yamamoto Shōya; born October 12, 1988 in Takefu, Fukui) is a Japanese Nippon Professional Baseball pitcher for the Hanshin Tigers in Japan's Central League.

== Early baseball career ==
During his younger years, Shōya's interest in baseball was largely influenced by his father who was an avid fan of the Hanshin Tigers. He started pitching in 3rd grade for the Takefu Blue Wave (little league) under the supervision of his father who was the team's manager, and continued playing for the "Takefu Boys" during junior high.

During his first year at Fukui University of Technology & High School, his team represented the prefecture to the Summer Koshien tournament, although he did not appear in any games. He played as the team's ace from the autumn of his 1st year until he graduated.

He entered Hosei University in Tokyo and continued pitching for its baseball team where he played with soon-to-be Hanshin teammate Kazuhito Futagami. His team was one of the regulars in the Tokyo Big6 Baseball League, but his game appearances were limited to only 6 innings (4 games) during his entire stay in university.

After graduation in 2010, he joined Oji Holdings Corp to play for the industrial leagues. In his 1st year, he was given the Best Pitcher Award during the Aichi Federation President's Cup, and from then onwards, he led his team to the intercity baseball tournament for 3 years straight.

== Hanshin Tigers ==
He was the Hanshin Tigers' 5th round pick in the 2013 Nippon Professional Baseball draft.

=== 2014 ===
He was able to immediately join the main roster's spring training camp in February, which was considered quite an achievement for a rookie who was a 5th round pick or lower. Afterwards, he was given the chance to pitch in 4 pre-season exhibition games. On March 11, he suffered his first loss when he surrendered a home run to Giants rookie Seiji Kobayashi, and eventually lost his chance to make it to the opening day roster when he finished the preseason games with a 13.5 ERA.

He played in western league (farm) games for most of the season, but he finally made it to the main roster on July 14, replacing Kosuke Katoh. He debuted on July 27 as a reliever against the Hiroshima Carps, where he faced 2 batters and struck out one. Four days later however, he gave away his first run when he pitched 2/3rds of an inning against the Swallows. Due to his difficulty in pitching against left-handed hitters (3 hits in 4 at-bats), he was demoted back to ni-gun. He spent the remainder of the season pitching in the minors, where he pitched in a total of 34 games and finished with a 1.95 ERA.

=== 2015 ===
On 4 July 2015 Yamamoto made his first professional start, pitching 5 innings in a 7-6 win against the Yokohama DeNA BayStars and earning the first win of his career.
