= Shoya Koyama =

Japanese footballer

Personal information
- Full name: Shoya Koyama
- Date of birth: 21 April 2003 (age 23)
- Place of birth: Yamaguchi, Japan
- Height: 1.74 m (5 ft 9 in)
- Position: Forward

Team information
- Current team: Kamatamare Sanuki
- Number: 26

Youth career
- Clefio Yamaguchi FC
- Kamatamare Sanuki

Senior career*
Years	Team	Apps	(Gls)
2021–	Kamatamare Sanuki	23	(0)
- * Club domestic league appearances and goals as of 23:22, 5 November 2023

Shoya Koyama (小山 聖也, Koyama Shōya; born 21 April 2003) is a Japanese footballer currently playing as a forward for Kamatamare Sanuki.

== Early life ==
Shoya was born in Yamaguchi. He played for Clefio Yamaguchi and Kamatamare Sanuki's youth sides.

== Career ==
Shoya made his debut for Kamatamare against Fujieda MYFC on the 4th of September 2021, coming on in the 46th minute for Mark Ajay Kurita.

== Career statistics ==
=== Club ===
As of 13 September 2021.

Club	Season	League			National Cup		League Cup		Other		Total	
Club	Season	Division	Apps	Goals	Apps	Goals	Apps	Goals	Apps	Goals	Apps	Goals
Kamatamare Sanuki	2021	J3 League	2	0	0	0	–		0	0	2	0
Career total			2	0	0	0	0	0	0	0	2	0
