= Gozen Kaigi =

Conference convened in the presence of the Japanese emperor

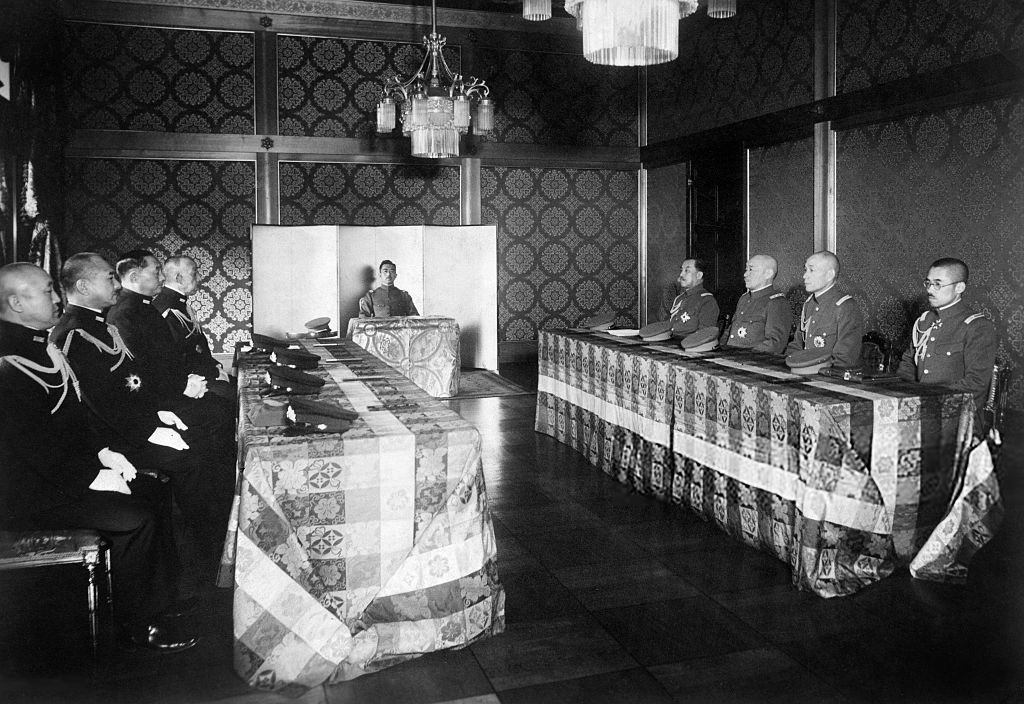
Gozen-kaigi January 11, 1938

In the Empire of Japan, an Imperial Conference (御前会議, Gozen Kaigi) (literally, a conference before the emperor) was an extraconstitutional conference on foreign matters of grave national importance that was convened by the government in the presence of the Emperor.

== History and background ==
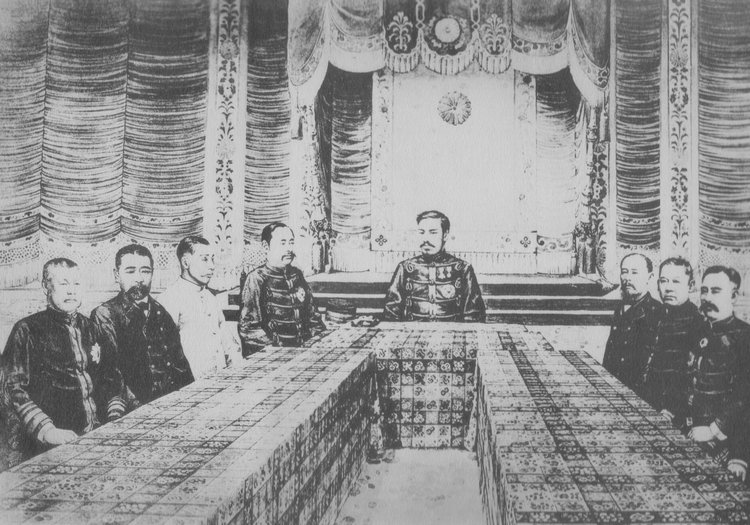
Emperor Meiji attends a Gozen Kaigi at the Imperial Headquarters in Hiroshima before the Sino-Japanese War

After the implementation of the Meiji Constitution, day-to-day affairs in the Meiji government were managed by a cabinet system arranged around the emperor as the head of state and the prime minister as the aide of the emperor.

However, on critical matters, extraconstitutional conferences were called to obtain final imperial approval for specific courses of action, which had already been previously decided upon by the civilian government, elder statesmen (genrō) and/or the military authorities at Liaison Conferences (連絡会議, Renraku kaigi). As a ruler, the emperor listened to discussions, but remained silent through the proceedings. That the emperor would ever disagree with, let alone veto, the prearranged decisions presented at the Gozen Kaigi was unthinkable.

Typically attending the Gozen Kaigi were (in addition to the Emperor himself):

- the Prime Minister
- the Minister of Foreign Affairs
- the Minister of Finance
- the President of the Planning Board
- the Minister of War
- the Minister of the Navy
- the Chief of the Army General Staff
- the Chief of the Navy General Staff

Press announcements were typically issued immediately after each Gozen Kaigi, listing attendees, what each person wore, and stressing the unanimity of any decision.

The first Gozen Kaigi was convened just before the First Sino-Japanese War. Others were held just before the Russo-Japanese War, entry into World War I, the signing of the Tripartite Pact, and various times during the Second Sino-Japanese War, and notably on 6 September, 5 November, and on 1 December 1941, just before the attack on Pearl Harbor.

It was only during the 6 September 1941 meeting and the final conference on 9 August 1945, for the acceptance of the Potsdam Declaration, that the emperor broke his traditional silence. During the last one, he ended a deadlock in discussions by personally advocating surrender with one condition, the preservation of the Kokutai, "with the understanding that the said declaration does not comprise any demand that prejudices the prerogatives of His Majesty as a sovereign ruler."

== See also ==
- Supreme War Council (Japan) (Gunji Sangikan Kaigi)
- Imperial Conference
