= Hideki Tojo =

Japanese general, prime minister from 1941 to 1944

General Hideki Tojo
- 東條 英機
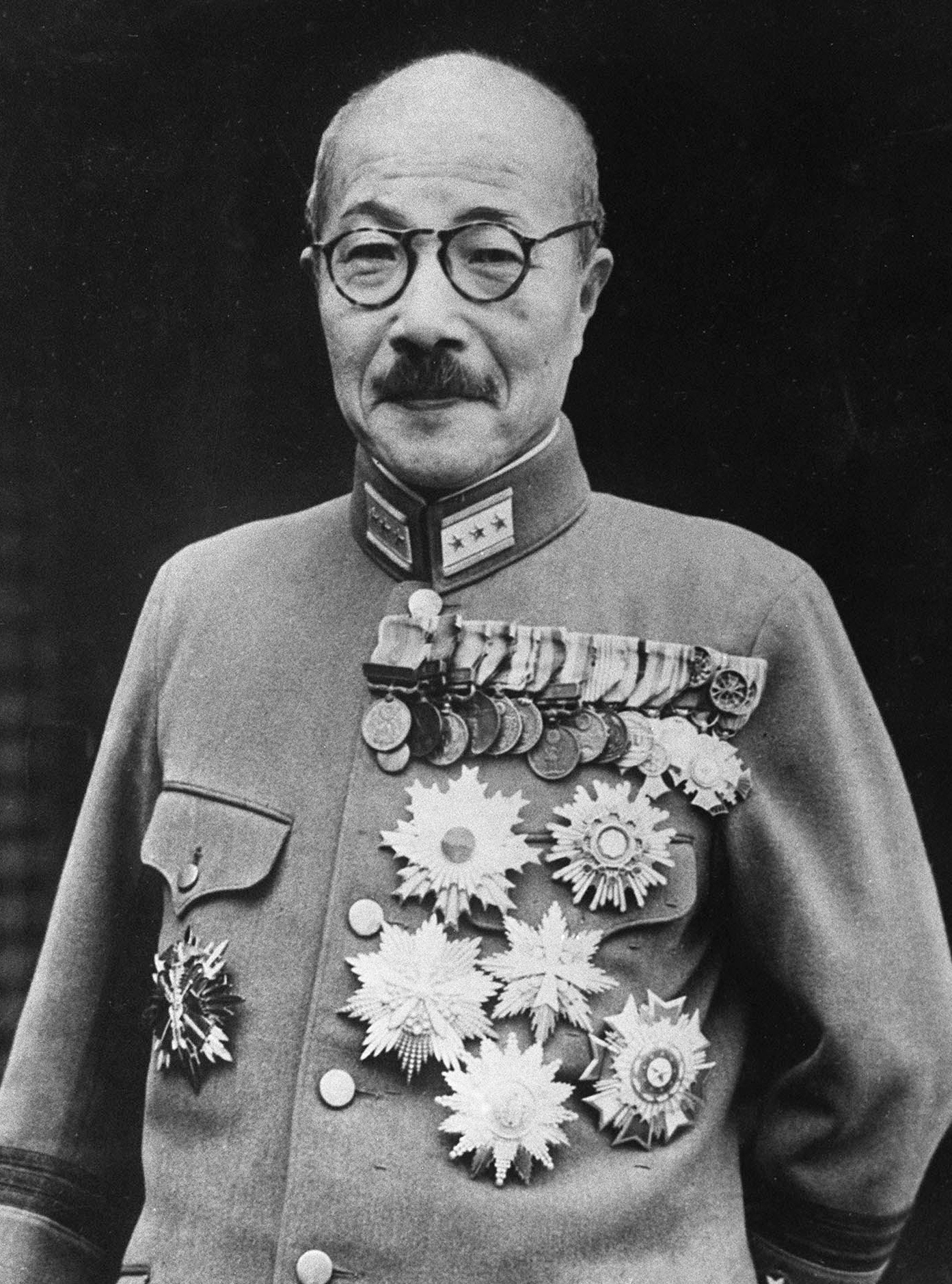
- Tojo in 1941

Prime Minister of Japan
- In office 18 October 1941 – 22 July 1944
- Monarch: Hirohito
- Preceded by: Fumimaro Konoe
- Succeeded by: Kuniaki Koiso
Ministerial offices
Minister of Munitions
In office 1 November 1943 – 22 July 1944
Prime Minister	Himself
Preceded by	Office established
Succeeded by	Ginjirō Fujiwara
Minister of the Army
In office 22 July 1940 – 22 July 1944
Prime Minister	Fumimaro Konoe; Himself
Preceded by	Shunroku Hata
Succeeded by	Hajime Sugiyama
Minister of Commerce and Industry
In office 8 October 1943 – 1 November 1943
Prime Minister	Himself
Preceded by	Nobusuke Kishi
Succeeded by	Chikuhei Nakajima (1945)
Minister of Education
In office 20 April 1943 – 23 April 1943
Prime Minister	Himself
Preceded by	Kunihiko Hashida
Succeeded by	Nagakage Okabe
Minister for Foreign Affairs
In office 1 September 1942 – 17 September 1942
Prime Minister	Himself
Preceded by	Shigenori Tōgō
Succeeded by	Masayuki Tani
Minister of Home Affairs
In office 18 October 1941 – 17 February 1942
Prime Minister	Himself
Preceded by	Harumichi Tanabe
Succeeded by	Michio Yuzawa

President of the Imperial Rule Assistance Association
- In office 18 October 1941 – 22 July 1944
- Vice President: Heisuke Yanagawa; Kisaburō Andō; Fumio Gotō
- Preceded by: Fumimaro Konoe
- Succeeded by: Kuniaki Koiso

Chief of the Imperial Japanese Army General Staff Office
- In office 21 February 1944 – 18 July 1944
- Prime Minister: Himself
- Preceded by: Hajime Sugiyama
- Succeeded by: Yoshijirō Umezu

Personal details
- Born: 30 December 1884 Kōjimachi, Tokyo, Japan
- Died: 23 December 1948 (aged 63) Sugamo Prison, Tokyo, Japan
- Party: Imperial Rule Assistance Association (1940–1945)
- Other political affiliations: Independent (before 1940)
- Spouse: Katsuko Ito (m. 1909)
- Children: 7
- Relatives: Yuko Tojo (granddaughter)
- Education: Imperial Japanese Army Academy; Army War College
- Awards: Grand Cordon of the Order of the Rising Sun; Order of the Golden Kite, 2nd Class; Order of the Sacred Treasure

Military service
- Allegiance: Empire of Japan
- Branch/service: Imperial Japanese Army
- Years of service: 1905–1945
- Rank: General
- Battles/wars: Siberian intervention; Second Sino-Japanese War; Operation Chahar; Pacific War
- Criminal information
- Status: Executed by hanging
- Convictions: Crimes against peace Crimes of aggression War crimes Crimes against humanity
- Trial: International Military Tribunal for the Far East
- Penalty: Death

Japanese name
- Kana: とうじょう ひでき
- Kyūjitai: 東條 英機
- Shinjitai: 東条 英機
Transcriptions
- Romanization: Tōjō Hideki

Hideki Tojo (Note: Japanese: 東條 英機, romanized: Tōjō Hideki, pronounced [toːʑoː çideki]) (30 December 1884 – 23 December 1948) was a Japanese military officer and politician who served as Prime Minister of Japan from 1941 to 1944 during World War II. His leadership was marked by widespread state violence and mass killings perpetrated in the name of Japanese nationalism.

Born into a military family of samurai descent in Kōjimachi, Tokyo, Tojo followed in his father's footsteps by pursuing a military career, graduating from the Imperial Japanese Army Academy in 1905. After serving as a military attaché in Germany, he rose to prominence in the 1930s as a member of the Tōseiha (lit. 'Control Faction') within the Imperial Japanese Army (IJA). In 1937, as chief of staff of the Kwantung Army, he led operations during the Japanese invasion of China. By 1940, he was appointed Minister of the Army, where he advocated a tripartite alliance with Nazi Germany and Fascist Italy. In October 1941, he was appointed Prime Minister of Japan by Emperor Hirohito.

Upon taking office as Prime Minister, Tojo prioritized the total mobilization of the Empire of Japan for "total war". He enforced strict censorship and utilized the Kempeitai (military police) to suppress dissent while promoting an ideology of absolute loyalty to the Emperor. His foreign policy was defined by the pursuit of the Greater East Asia Co-Prosperity Sphere, a concept used to justify aggressive expansion into Southeast Asia and the Pacific in order to secure natural resources. On 7 December 1941, Tojo's cabinet oversaw the Japanese attack on Pearl Harbor which resulted in his country's entry into World War II on the side of the Axis powers. Despite achieving significant territorial gains in Asia and the Pacific during the opening months of the conflict, the tide decisively turned against Japan following its defeat at the Battle of Midway in June 1942. In the capacity of his nation's head of government throughout most of the war, Tojo presided over numerous war crimes, including the massacre and starvation of thousands of POWs and millions of civilians.

As Allied forces closed in on the Japanese home islands, Tojo's hold on power steadily declined before he was ultimately forced to resign on 18 July 1944 upon the fall of Saipan. After his nation's surrender to the Allied powers in September 1945, he was arrested, convicted by the International Military Tribunal for the Far East in the Tokyo Trials, sentenced to death, and hanged on 23 December 1948. To this day, Tojo's complicity in the July 1937 invasion of China, the surprise attack on Pearl Harbor in December 1941 and numerous acts of mass murder have firmly intertwined his legacy with the Empire of Japan's warmongering brutality during the early Shōwa era.

== Early life and education ==
Hideki Tojo was born in the Kōjimachi district of Tokyo on 30 December 1884, as the third son of Hidenori Tojo, a lieutenant general in the Imperial Japanese Army. Under the bakufu, Japanese society was organized into a rigid status hierarchy consisting of samurai, peasants, artisans, and merchants. Although this feudal status system was formally abolished in 1871 after the Meiji Restoration, many social distinctions continued to influence Japanese society. Tojo's family belonged to the samurai class, though they were relatively low-ranking retainers in service to a powerful daimyō. Tojo's father was a samurai turned Army officer and his mother was the daughter of a Buddhist priest, making his family very respectable but poor.

Tojo had an education typical of Japanese youth in the Meiji era. As a boy, Tojo was known for his stubbornness, lack of a sense of humor, and tenacious way of pursuing what he wanted. He was an opinionated and combative youth who was fond of getting into fights with other boys. Japanese schools in the Meiji era were very competitive, and there was no tradition of sympathy for those who failed, and were often bullied by the teachers. Those who knew him during his formative years deemed him to be of only average intelligence. However, he was known to compensate for his observed lack of intellect with a willingness to work extremely hard. Tojo's boyhood hero was the 17th-century shogun Tokugawa Ieyasu who issued the injunction: "Avoid the things you like, turn your attention to unpleasant duties." Tojo liked to say, "I am just an ordinary man possessing no shining talents. Anything I have achieved I owe to my capacity for hard work and never giving up." In 1899, Tojo enrolled in the Army Cadet School.

In 1905, Tojo shared in the general outrage in Japan at the Treaty of Portsmouth, which ended the war with Russia and was seen by the Japanese people as a betrayal, as the war did not end with Japan annexing Siberia, which popular opinion had demanded. The Treaty of Portsmouth was so unpopular that it set off anti-American riots known as the Hibiya incendiary incident, as many Japanese were enraged at the way the Americans had apparently cheated Japan as the Japanese gains in the treaty were far less than what public opinion had expected. Very few Japanese people at the time had understood that the war against Russia had pushed their nation to the verge of bankruptcy, and most people in Japan believed that U.S. president Theodore Roosevelt who had mediated the Treaty of Portsmouth had cheated Japan out of its rightful gains. Tojo's anger at the Treaty of Portsmouth left him with an abiding dislike of Americans. In 1909, he married Katsuko Ito, with whom he had three sons (Hidetake, Teruo, and Toshio) and four daughters (Mitsue, Makie, Sachie, and Kimie).

== Military service ==
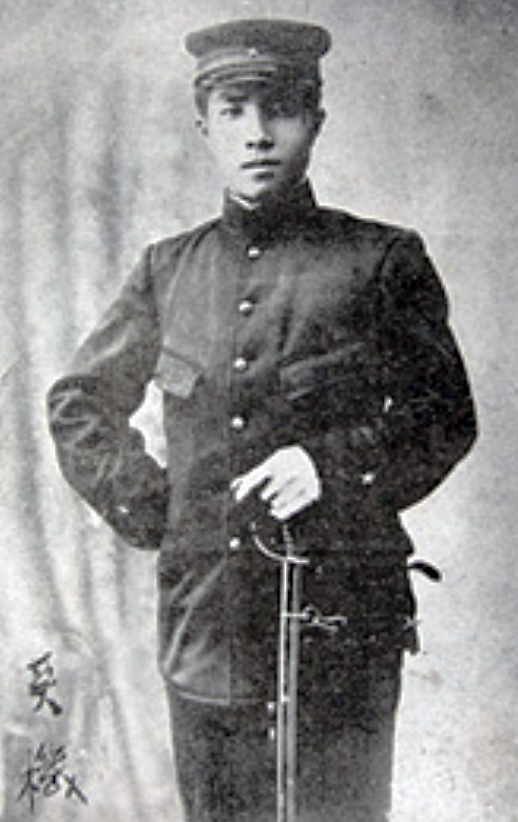
Young Hideki Tojo

=== Early military career ===
Upon graduating from the Imperial Japanese Army Academy (ranked 10th of 363 cadets) in March 1905, he was commissioned as a second lieutenant in the infantry of the IJA. In 1918–19, he briefly served in Siberia as part of the Japanese expeditionary force sent to intervene in the Russian Civil War. He served as a Japanese military attache to Germany between 1919 and 1922. As the Imperial Japanese Army had been trained by a German military mission in the 19th century, the Japanese Army was always very strongly influenced by intellectual developments in the German Army, and Tojo was no exception. In the 1920s, the German military favored preparing for the next war by creating a totalitarian Wehrstaat (Defense State), an idea that was taken up by the Japanese military as the "national defense state." In 1922, on his way home to Japan, he took a train ride across the United States, his first and only visit to North America, which left him with the impression that the Americans were a materialistic soft people devoted only to making money and to hedonistic pursuits like sex, partying, and (despite Prohibition) drinking.

Tojo boasted that his only hobby was his work, and he customarily brought home his paperwork to work late into the night and refused to have any part in raising his children, which he viewed both as a distraction from his work and a woman's duty. He had his wife do all the work of taking care of his children. A stern, humorless man, he was known for his brusque manner, his obsession with etiquette, and his coldness. Like almost all Japanese officers at the time, he routinely slapped the faces of the men under his command when giving orders. He said that face-slapping was a "means of training" men who came from families that were not part of the samurai caste and for whom bushido was not second nature.

In 1924, Tojo was greatly offended by the Immigration Control Act, which was passed by the US Congress. It banned all Asian immigration into the United States, with many representatives and senators openly saying the act was necessary because Asians worked harder than whites. He wrote with bitterness at the time that American whites would never accept Asians as equals: "It [the Immigration Control Act] shows how the strong will always put their own interests first. Japan, too, has to be strong to survive in the world."

By 1928, he was bureau chief of the Japanese Army and was shortly thereafter promoted to colonel. He began to take an interest in militarist politics during his command of the 8th Infantry Regiment. Reflecting the imagery often used in Japan to describe people in power, he told his officers that they were to be both a "father" and a "mother" to the men under their command. Tojo often visited the homes of the men under his command, assisted his men with personal problems, and made loans to officers short of money. Like many other Japanese officers, he disliked Western cultural influence in Japan, which was often disparaged as resulting in the ero guro nansensu ("eroticism, grotesquerie and nonsense") movement as he complained about such forms of "Western decadence" like young couples holding hands and kissing in public, which were undermining traditional values necessary to uphold the kokutai.

=== Senior command and rise to prominence ===
In 1934, Tojo was promoted to major general and served as chief of the personnel department within the Army Ministry. Tojo wrote a chapter in the book Hijōji kokumin zenshū (Essays in time of national emergency), a book published in March 1934 by the Army Ministry calling for Japan to become a totalitarian "national defense state". This book of fifteen essays by senior generals argued that Japan had defeated Russia in the war of 1904–05 because bushidō had given the Japanese superior willpower as the Japanese did not fear death unlike the Russians who wanted to live, and what was needed to win the inevitable next war (against precisely whom the book did not say) was to repeat the example of the Russian-Japanese war on a much greater scale by creating the "national defense state" to mobilize the entire nation for war. In his essay, Tojo wrote "The modern war of national defense extends over a great many areas" requiring "a state that can monolithically control" all aspects of the nation in the political, social and economic spheres. Tojo attacked Britain, France and the United States for waging "ideological war" against Japan since 1919. Tojo ended his essay by stating that Japan must stand tall "and spread its own moral principles to the world" as the "cultural and ideological war of the 'imperial way' is about to begin".

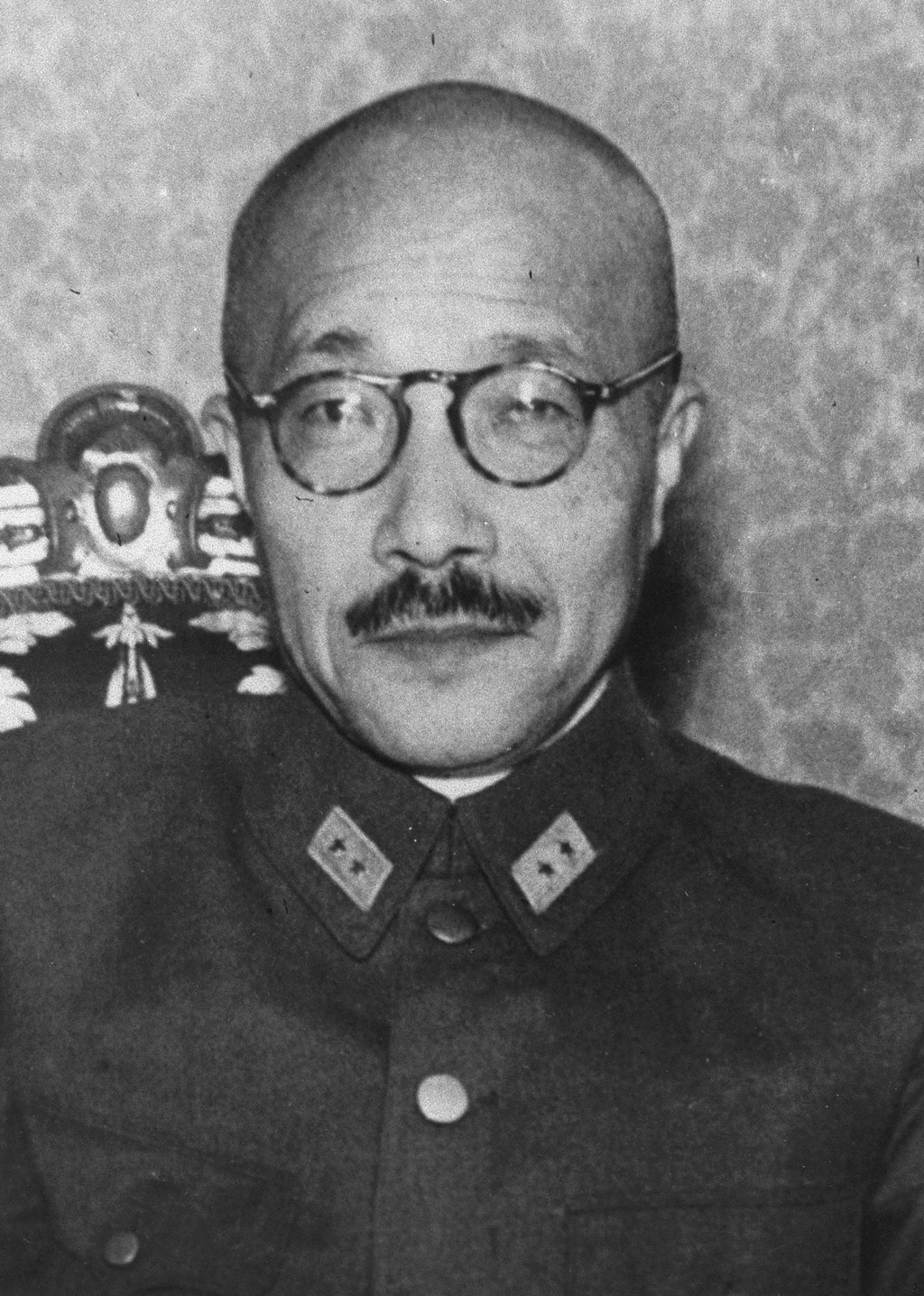
Tojo as a lieutenant general

Tojo was appointed commander of the IJA 24th Infantry Brigade in August 1934. In September 1935, Tojo assumed top command of the Kempeitai of the Kwantung Army in Manchuria. Politically, he was nationalist, and militarist, and was nicknamed "Razor" (カミソリ, Kamisori), for his reputation of having a sharp and legalistic mind capable of quick decision-making. Tojo was a member of the Tōseiha ("Control Faction") in the Army which was opposed to the more radical Kōdōha ("Imperial Way") faction. Both the Tōseiha and the Kōdōha factions were militaristic groups that favored a policy of expansionism abroad and dictatorship under the Emperor at home, but differed over the best way of achieving these goals. The Imperial Way faction wanted a coup d'état to achieve a Shōwa Restoration; emphasized "spirit" as the principal war-winning factor; and despite advocating socialist policies at home wanted to invade the Soviet Union. The Control faction, while being willing to use assassination to achieve its goals, was more willing to work within the system to achieve reforms; wanted to create the "national defense state" to mobilize the entire nation before going to war and, while not rejecting the idea of "spirit" as a war-winning factor, also saw military modernization as a war-winning factor and the United States as a future enemy just as much as the Soviet Union.

During the February 26 coup attempt of 1936, Tojo opposed the rebels who were associated with the rival "Imperial Way" faction. Emperor Hirohito himself was outraged at the attacks on his close advisors, and after a brief political crisis and stalling on the part of sympathetic officers, the rebels were forced to surrender. As the commander of the Kempeitai, Tojo ordered the arrest of officers in the Kwantung Army suspected of supporting the coup attempt in Tokyo. In the aftermath, the Tōseiha purged the army of Kōdōha officers, and the coup leaders were tried and executed. After the purge, the army was unified in their nationalist but highly anti-political stance under the banner of the Tōseiha military clique, which included Tojo as one of its leaders.

Tojo was promoted to chief of staff of the Kwantung Army in 1937. As the "Empire of Manchukuo" was, in reality, a Japanese puppet regime masking a de facto colony, the Kwangtung Army's duties were just as much political as they were military. The Army exercised control and sidelined the legal civilian ruling government. During this period, Tojo became close to Yōsuke Matsuoka, the fiery ultra-nationalist president of the South Manchuria Railway, one of Asia's largest corporations at the time, and Nobusuke Kishi, the Vice Minister of Industry in Manchukuo, who was the man de facto in charge of Manchukuo's economy. Though Tojo regarded preparing for a war against the Soviet Union as his first duty, Tojo also supported the forward policy in Northern China, as the Japanese sought to extend their influence into China. As chief of staff, Tojo was responsible for the military operations designed to increase Japanese penetration into the Inner Mongolia border regions with Manchukuo. In July 1937, he personally led the units of the 1st Independent Mixed Brigade in Operation Chahar, his only real combat experience.

After the Marco Polo Bridge Incident marking the start of the Second Sino-Japanese War, Tojo ordered his forces to attack Hebei Province and other targets in northern China. Tojo received Jewish refugees in accordance with Japanese national policy and rejected the resulting Nazi German protests. Tojo was recalled to Japan in May 1938 to serve as vice-minister of the army under Army Minister Seishirō Itagaki. From December 1938 to 1940, Tojo was Inspector-General of Army Aviation.

== Rise to power ==
=== Advocacy for preventive war ===
On 1 June 1940, Emperor Hirohito appointed Kōichi Kido, a leading "reform bureaucrat" as the Lord Keeper of the Privy Seal, making him into the Emperor's leading political advisor and fixer. Kido had aided in the creation in the 1930s of an alliance between the "reform bureaucrats" and the Army's "Control" faction centered on Tojo and General Akira Mutō. Kido's appointment also favored the rise of his allies in the Control faction. On 30 July 1940, Tojo was appointed army minister in the second Fumimaro Konoe regime and remained in that post in the third Konoe cabinet. Prince Konoe had chosen Tojo, a man representative of both the Army's hardline views and the Control faction with whom he was considered reasonable to deal, to secure the Army's backing for his foreign policy. Tojo was a militant ultra-nationalist who was well respected for his work ethic and his ability to handle paperwork. Tojo upheld the wartime Japanese doctrine of the emperor as a living god, aligning his actions with imperial directives as part of his loyalty to the kokutai. Konoe favored having Germany mediate an end to the Sino-Japanese War, pressured Britain to end its economic and military support of China even at the risk of war, sought better relations with both Germany and the United States, and took advantage of the changes in the international order caused by Germany's victories in the spring of 1940 to make Japan a stronger power in Asia. Konoe wanted to make Japan the dominant power in East Asia, but he also believed it was possible to negotiate a modus vivendi with the United States under which the Americans would agree to recognize the "Greater East Asia Co-prosperity Sphere".

By 1940, Konoe, who had started the war with China in 1937, no longer believed that a military solution to the "China Affair" was possible and instead favored having Germany mediate an end to the war that would presumably result in a pro-Japanese peace settlement, but would be less than he himself had outlined in the "Konoe programme" of January 1938. For this reason, Konoe wanted Tojo, a tough general whose ultra-nationalism was beyond question, to provide "cover" for his attempt to seek a diplomatic solution to the war with China. Tojo was a strong supporter of the Tripartite Pact between Imperial Japan, Nazi Germany, and Fascist Italy. After negotiations with Vichy France, Japan was given permission to place its troops in the southern part of French Indochina in July 1941. In spite of its formal recognition of the Vichy government, the United States retaliated against Japan by imposing economic sanctions in August, including a total embargo on oil and gasoline exports. On 6 September, a deadline of early October was fixed in the Imperial Conference for resolving the situation diplomatically. On 14 October, the deadline had passed with no progress. Prime Minister Konoe then held his last cabinet meeting in which Tojo did most of the talking:

For the past six months, ever since April, the foreign minister has made painstaking efforts to adjust relations. Although I respect him for that, we remain deadlocked ... The heart of the matter is the imposition on us of withdrawal from Indochina and China ... If we yield to America's demands, it will destroy the fruits of the China incident. Manchukuo will be endangered and our control of Korea undermined.

During the last cabinet meetings of the Konoe government, Tojo emerged as a hawkish voice, saying he did not want a war with the United States but portrayed the Americans as arrogant, bullying, and white supremacists. He said that any compromise solution would only encourage them to make more extreme demands on Japan, in which case Japan might be better off choosing war to uphold national honor. Despite saying he favored peace, Tojo had often declared at cabinet meetings that any withdrawal from French Indochina and/or China would be damaging to military morale and might threaten the kokutai; the "China Incident" could not be resolved via diplomacy and required a military solution; and attempting to compromise with the Americans would be seen as weakness by them.

On 16 October, Konoe, politically isolated and convinced that the emperor no longer trusted him, resigned. Later, he justified himself to his chief cabinet secretary, Kenji Tomita:

Of course His Majesty is a pacifist, and there is no doubt he wished to avoid war. When I told him that to initiate war is a mistake, he agreed. But the next day, he would tell me: "You were worried about it yesterday, but you do not have to worry so much." Thus, gradually, he began to lean toward war. And the next time I met him, he leaned even more toward war. In short, I felt the Emperor was telling me: "My prime minister does not understand military matters, I know much more." In short, the Emperor had absorbed the views of the army and navy high commands.

== Premiership and World War II (1941–1944) ==
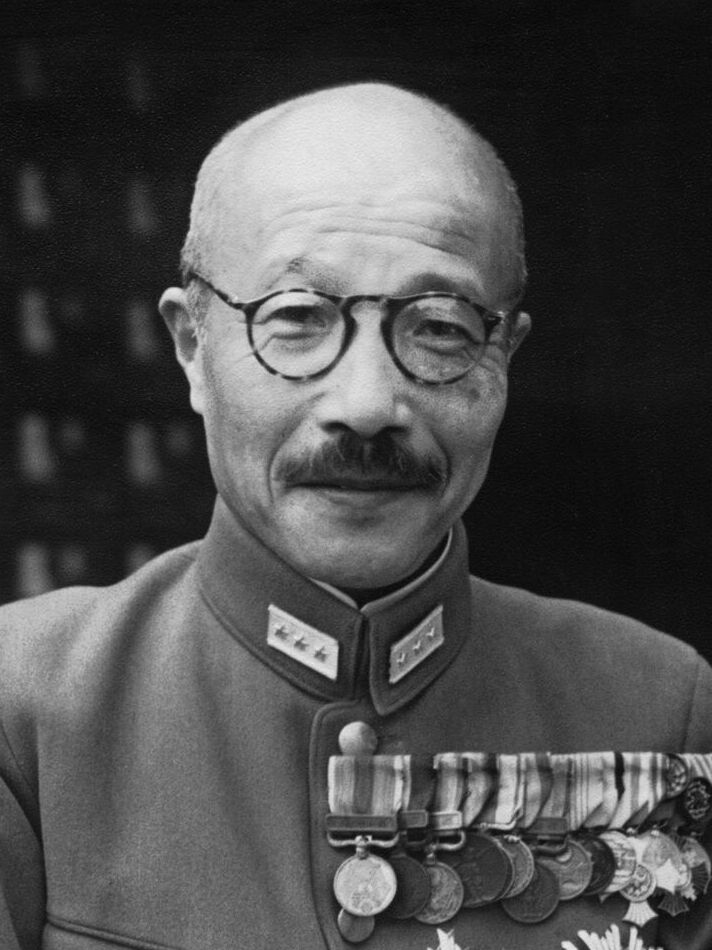
- Premiership of Hideki Tojo; 18 October 1941 – 22 July 1944
- Monarch: Emperor Shōwa
- Cabinet: Tōjō Cabinet
- Party: Imperial Rule Assistance Association
- Election: 1942
- Seat: Naikaku Sōri Daijin Kantei
- Emblem of the Government of Japan

At the time, Prince Naruhiko Higashikuni was said to be the only person who could control the Army and the Navy and was recommended by Konoe and Tojo as Konoe's replacement. Hirohito rejected this option, arguing that a member of the imperial family should not have to eventually carry the responsibility for a war against the West as a defeat would ruin the prestige of the House of Yamato. Following the advice of Kōichi Kido, he chose instead Tojo, who was known for his devotion to the imperial institution. By tradition, the Emperor needed a consensus among the elder statesmen or "jushin" before appointing a prime minister, and as long as former prime minister Admiral Keisuke Okada was opposed to Tojo, it would be impolitic for the Emperor to appoint him. During the meetings of the jushin regarding Prince Konoe's succession, Okada argued against Tojo's appointment while the Lord Keeper of the Privy Seal Kōichi Kido pushed for Tojo. The result was a compromise where Tojo would become prime minister while "re-examining" the options for dealing with the crisis with the United States, though no promise was made Tojo would attempt to avoid a war.

After being informed of Tojo's appointment, Prince Takamatsu wrote in his diary: "We have finally committed to war and now must do all we can to launch it powerfully. But we have clumsily telegraphed our intentions. We needn't have signaled what we're going to do; having [the entire Konoe cabinet] resign was too much. As matters stand now we can merely keep silent and without the least effort war will begin." Tojo's first speech on the radio made a call for "world peace", but also stated his determination to settle the "China Affair" on Japanese terms and to achieve the "Greater East Asia Co-Prosperity Sphere" that would unite all of the Asian nations together.

=== Decision for war ===
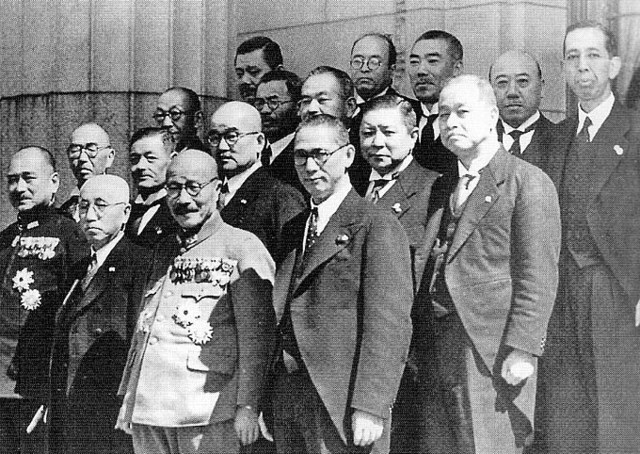
Ministers of the first Tojo Cabinet, October 1941

The Emperor summoned Tojo to the Imperial Palace one day before Tojo took office. After being informed of his appointment, Tojo was given one order from the Emperor: to make a policy review of what had been sanctioned by the Imperial Conferences. Despite being vocally on the side of war, Tojo nevertheless accepted the order and pledged to obey. According to Colonel Akiho Ishii, a member of the Army General Staff, the newly appointed prime minister showed a true sense of loyalty to the emperor performing the duty. For example, when Ishii received from Hirohito a communication saying the Army should drop the idea of stationing troops in China to counter the military operations of the Western powers, he wrote a reply for Tojo for his audience with the Emperor. Tojo then replied to Ishii: "If the Emperor said it should be so, then that's it for me. One cannot recite arguments to the Emperor. You may keep your finely phrased memorandum." On 2 November, Tojo and Chiefs of Staff Hajime Sugiyama and Osami Nagano reported to Hirohito that the review had been in vain. The Emperor then gave his consent to war.

At the November 5 Gozen Kaigi, Tojo came to support Yoshimichi Hara's case for a temporary restraint in the attack to ensure a strong relationship with Germany and Italy. Hara had feared that an attack on the United States would be seen as a racial war by Germany, thus prompting it to align with United States and Britain due to a "common hatred of the yellow race." Tojo agreed with the need to avoid "being encircled by the Aryan race," and stated that "at any cost, we shall make sure that it will not end up becoming a racial war."

On 26 November 1941, U.S. Secretary of State Cordell Hull handed Ambassador Nomura and Kurusu Saburo in Washington a "draft mutual declaration of policy" and "Outline of Proposed Basis for Agreement between the United States and Japan." Hull proposed that Japan "withdraw all military, naval, air and police forces" from China and French Indochina in exchange for lifting the oil embargo, but left the term China undefined. The "Hull note," as it is known in Japan, made it clear the United States would not recognise the puppet government of Wang Jingwei as the government of China but strongly implied that the United States might recognise Manchukuo and did not impose a deadline for the Japanese withdrawal from China. On 27 November 1941, Tojo chose to misrepresent the "Hull note" to the Cabinet as an "ultimatum to Japan," which was incorrect as it did not have a timeline for its acceptance and was marked "tentative" in the opening sentence, which is inconsistent with an ultimatum. The claim that the Americans had demanded in the "Hull note" Japanese withdrawal from all of China, instead of just the parts that they had occupied since 1937, as well as the claim the note was an ultimatum, was used as one of the principal excuses for choosing war with the United States. On 1 December, another conference finally sanctioned the "war against the United States, England, and the Netherlands." Shortly thereafter, Tojo was informed for the first time of the navy's plan to attack the US naval base at Pearl Harbor.

=== Outbreak of the Pacific War ===
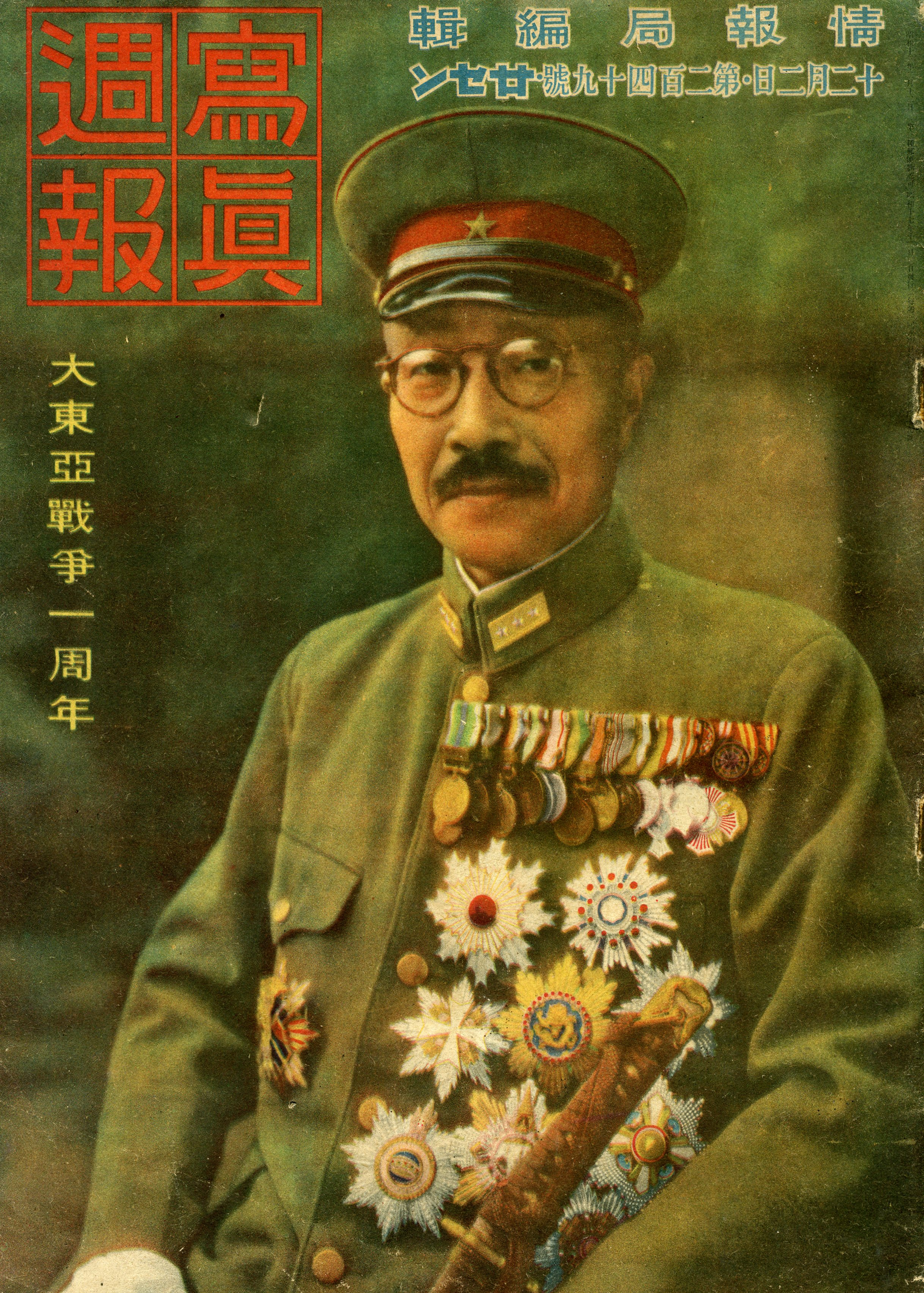
Tojo covers Shashin Shūhō, a Japanese magazine published by the Cabinet Intelligence Bureau, on 2 December 1942, days before the first anniversary of the Greater East Asia War.

Tojo was awakened at 5:00 a.m. on 8 December 1941 (7 December in the Americas) and told of the successful attack on Pearl Harbor. Later that day, Tojo went on Japanese radio to announce that Japan was now at war with the United States, the British Empire, and the Netherlands. Tojo continued to hold the position of army minister during his term as prime minister from 17 October 1941, to 22 July 1944. He also served concurrently as home minister from 1941 to 1942, foreign minister in September 1942, education minister in 1943, and minister of Commerce and Industry in 1943.

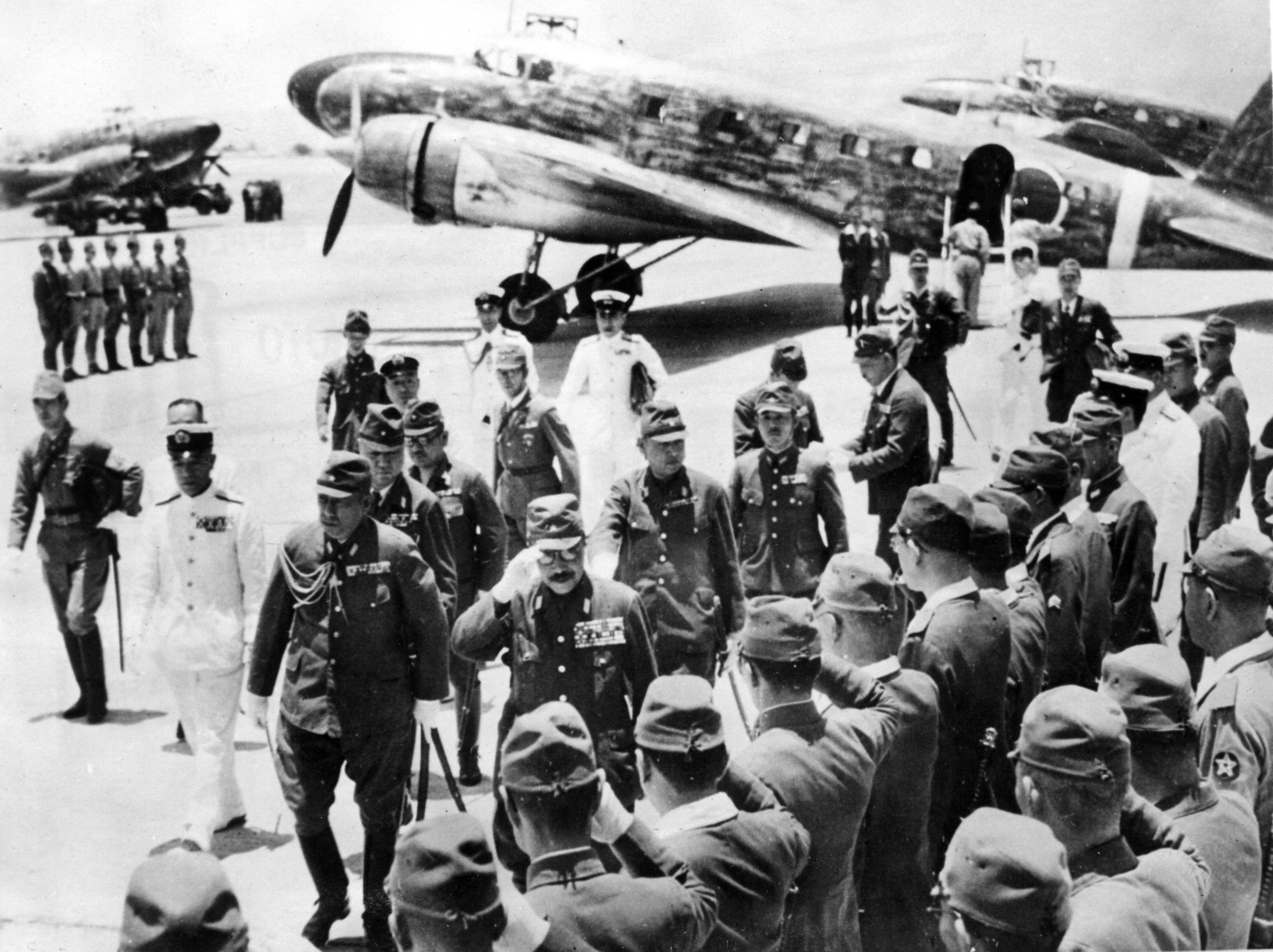
Tojo lands in Nichols Field, an airfield south of Manila, for a state visit to the Philippines.

While Tojo was prime minister, the main forum for military decision-making was the Imperial General Headquarters presided over by the Emperor. It consisted of the Army and Navy ministers; the Army and Navy chiefs of staff; and chiefs of the military affairs bureaus in both services. The Imperial GHQ was not a joint chiefs of staff as existed in the United States and United Kingdom, but rather two separate services command operating under the same roof who would meet about twice a week to attempt to agree on a common strategy. The Operations Bureaus of the Army and Navy would develop their own plans and then attempt to "sell them" to the other, which was often not possible.

Tojo was one voice out of many speaking at the Imperial GHQ, and was not able to impose his will on the Navy with which he had to negotiate as if he were dealing with an ally. The American historian Stanley Falk described the Japanese system as characterized by "bitter inter-service antagonisms" as the Army and Navy worked "at cross-purposes", observing the Japanese system of command was "uncoordinated, ill-defined and inefficient." The American historian Herbert Bix wrote that Tojo was a "dictator" only in the narrow sense that from September 1942 on, he was generally able to impose his will on the Cabinet without seeking a consensus, but at the same time noted that Tojo's authority was based upon the support of the Emperor, who held ultimate power.

On 18 April 1942, the Americans staged the Doolittle Raid, bombing Tokyo. Some of the American planes were shot down and their pilots were taken prisoner. The Army General Staff led by General Hajime Sugiyama insisted on executing the eight American fliers but was opposed by Tojo, who feared that the Americans would retaliate against Japanese prisoners-of-war if the Doolittle fliers were executed. The dispute was resolved by the emperor, who commuted the death sentences of five fliers but allowed the other three to die for reasons that remain unclear, as the documents relating to the emperor's intervention were burned in 1945.

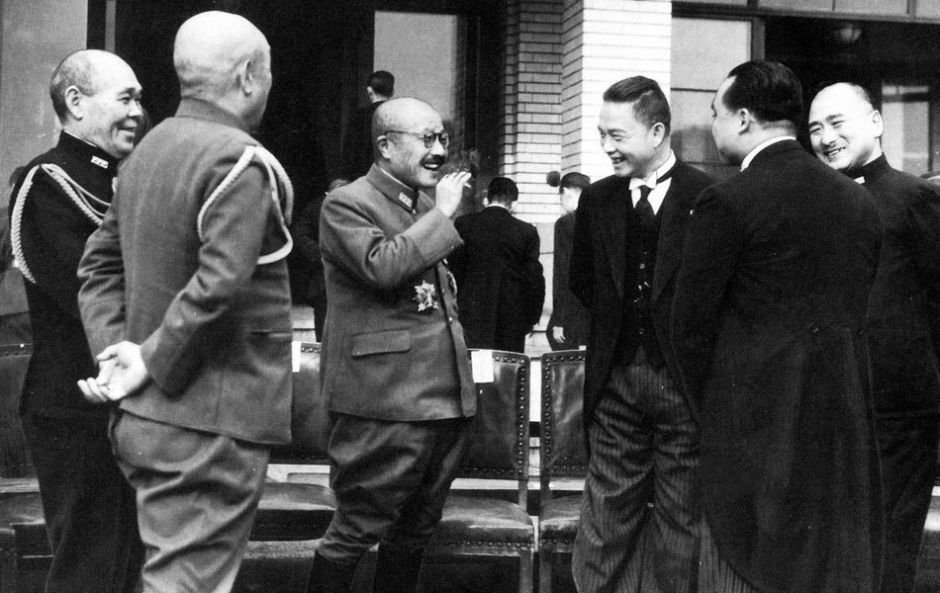
Wang Jingwei of the Japanese-sponsored puppet government in Nanjing meeting with Tojo in 1942

However, when the tide of war turned against Japan after the Battle of Midway in June 1942, Tojo faced increasing opposition within the government and military. In August–September 1942, a major crisis gripped the Tojo cabinet when Foreign Minister Shigenori Tōgō objected quite violently on 29 August 1942, to the Prime Minister's plan to establish a Greater East Asia Ministry to handle relations with the puppet regimes in Asia as an insult to the Ministry of Foreign Affairs (the Gaimusho) and threatened to resign in protest. Tojo went to see the Emperor, who backed the Prime Minister's plans for the Greater East Asia Ministry, and on 1 September 1942, Tojo told the cabinet he was establishing the Greater East Asia Ministry and could not care less about how the Gaimusho felt about the issue, which led Tōgō to resign in protest.

In November 1942, Tojo, as Army Minister, was involved in drafting regulations for taking "comfort women" from China, Japan (which included Taiwan and Korea at this time) and Manchukuo to the "South", as the Japanese called their conquests in South-East Asia, to ensure that the "comfort women" had the proper papers before departing. Until then the War Ministry required special permission to take "comfort women" without papers, and Tojo was tired of dealing with these requests.

As 1942 drew to a close, Tojo as Army Minister, clashed with General Sugiyama over whether or not to continue the battle of Guadalcanal. Ultimately, after sacking numerous officers in the Army General Staff opposed to the withdrawal, Tojo ordered the abandonment of the island.

=== Setbacks and resignation ===
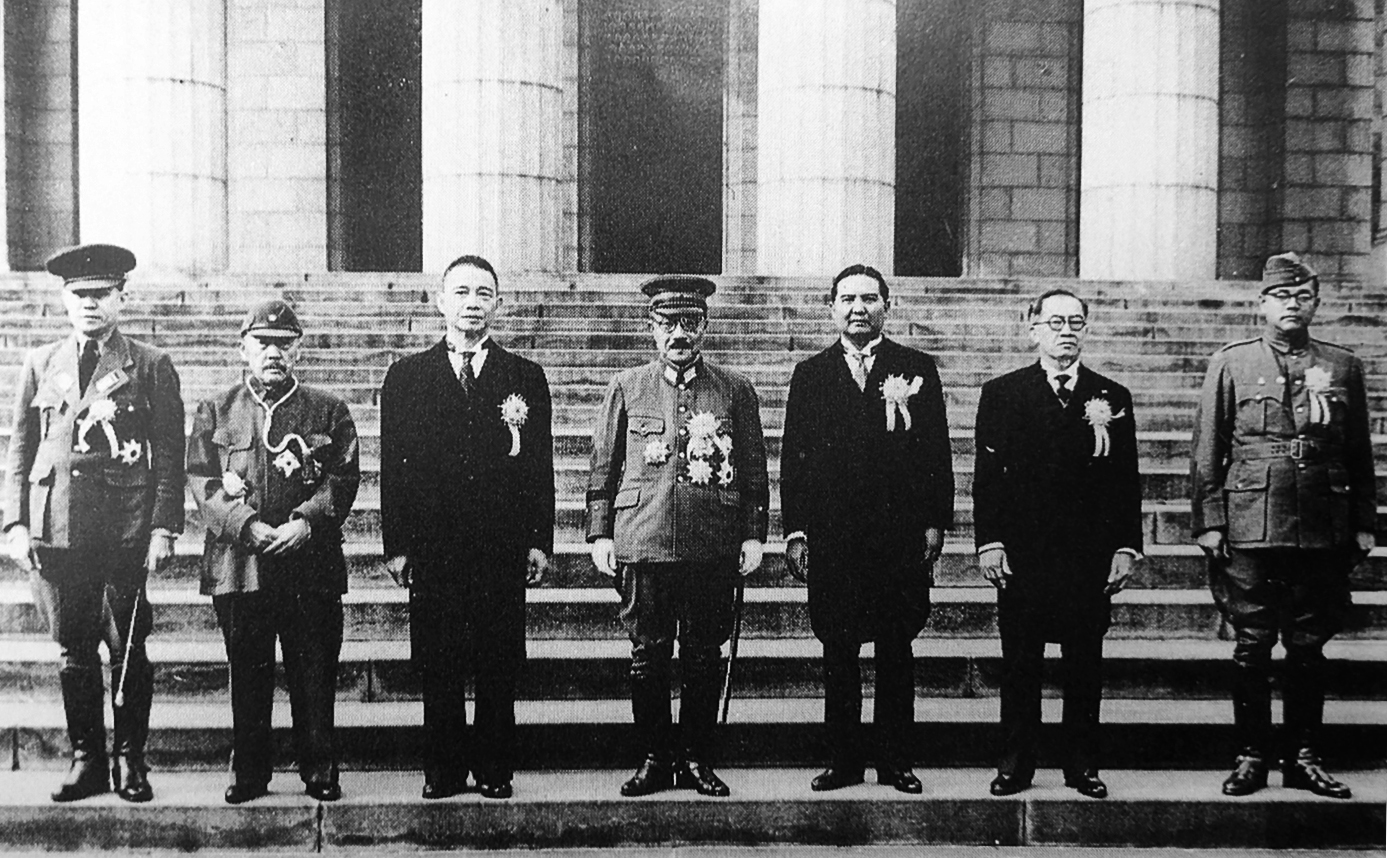
The Greater East Asia Conference in November 1943, participants left to right: Ba Maw, Zhang Jinghui, Wang Jingwei, Hideki Tojo, Wan Waithayakon, José P. Laurel, Subhas Chandra Bose.

In September 1943, the Emperor and Tojo agreed that Japan would pull back to an "absolute defense line" in the southwest Pacific to stem the American advance, and considered abandoning Rabaul base, but changed their minds in the face of objections from the Navy. In late 1943, with the support of the Emperor, Tojo made a major effort to make peace with China to free up the 2 million Japanese soldiers in China for operations elsewhere, but the unwillingness of the Japanese to give up any of their "rights and interests" in China doomed the effort. China was by far the largest theater of operations for Japan, and with the Americans steadily advancing in the Pacific, Tojo was anxious to end the quagmire of the "China affair" to redeploy Japanese forces. In an attempt to enlist support from all of Asia, especially China, Tojo opened the Greater East Asia Conference in November 1943, which issued a set of Pan-Asian war aims, which made little impression on most Asians. On 9 January 1944, Japan signed a treaty with the puppet Wang regime under which Japan gave up its extraterritorial rights in China as part of a bid to win Chinese public opinion over to a pro-Japanese viewpoint, but as the treaty changed nothing in practice, the gambit failed.

Tojo decided to take the strategic offensive for 1944, expecting to end the war with China through Operation Ichi-Go, take India through Operation U-Go, and annihilate the U.S. 5th Fleet in the central Pacific, while staying on the defensive in the Southwest Pacific. Tojo expected that a major American defeat in the Marianas combined with the conquest of China and India would so stun the Americans that they would sue for peace. By this point, Tojo no longer believed the war aims of 1942 could be achieved, but he believed that his plans for victory in 1944 would lead to a compromise peace that he could present as a victory to the Japanese people. To strengthen his position in the face of criticism of the way the war was going, Tojo assumed the post of Chief of the Imperial Japanese Army General Staff on 21 February 1944. By holding both of the top leadership positions within the Army while serving concurrently as prime minister, Tojo henceforth assumed full responsibility for the course of the war.

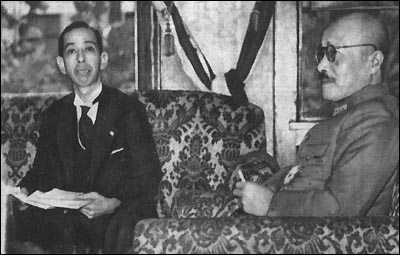
Tojo meets with Vice Minister of Munitions Nobusuke Kishi, who later became a prime minister in postwar Japan.

In January 1944, Tojo approved orders issued by Imperial General Headquarters for an invasion of India. The Burma Area Army in Burma under General Masakazu Kawabe was to seize the Manipour and Assam provinces with the aim of cutting off American aid to China (the railroad that supplied the American air bases in north-east India that allowed for supplies to be flown over "the Hump" of the Himalayas to China passed through these provinces). Following the 15th Army into India in the U-Go offensive were the Indian nationalist Subhas Chandra Bose and his Indian National Army, as the political purpose of the operation was to provoke a general uprising against British rule in India that might allow the Japanese to take all of India. The Japanese were counting on capturing food from the British to feed their army, assuming that all of India would rise up when the Japanese arrived and thereby cause the collapse of the Raj. The Japanese brought along with them enough food to last for only 20 days; after that, they would have to capture food from the British to avoid starving.

Arrival of Prime Minister Tōjō on Japanese-occupied Java in a propaganda film, January 1943

On 12 March 1944, the Japanese launched the U-Go offensive and invaded India. Despite the Japanese Pan-Asian rhetoric and claim to be liberating India, the Indian people did not revolt and the Indian soldiers of the 14th Army stayed loyal to their British officers, and the invasion of India ended in complete disaster. The Japanese were defeated by the Anglo-Indian 14th Army at the Battles of Imphal and Kohima. On 5 July 1944, the Emperor accepted Tojo's advice to end the invasion of India after 72,000 Japanese soldiers had been killed in battle. A similar number had starved to death or died of diseases as the logistics to support an invasion of India were lacking, once the monsoons turned the roads of Burma into impassable mud. Of the 150,000 Japanese soldiers who had participated in the March invasion of India, most were dead by July 1944.

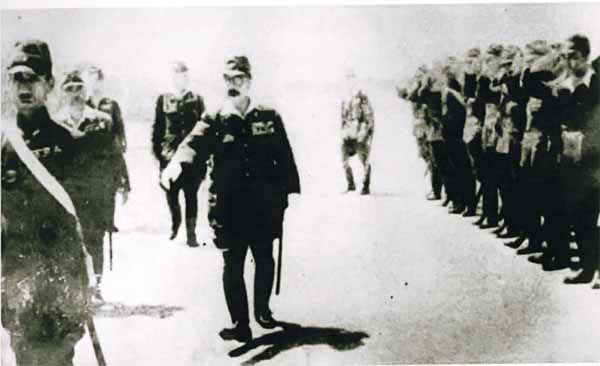
Tojo inspecting an airfield in Kuching in occupied British Borneo, July 1943

In the central Pacific, the Americans destroyed the main Japanese naval base at Truk in an air raid on 18 February 1944, forcing the Imperial Navy back to the Marianas (the oil to fuel ships and planes operating in the Marshalls, Caroline and Gilbert islands went up in smoke at Truk). As a result, The Americans had penetrated 2,100 km (1,300 miles) beyond the "absolute defense line". This breach led Tojo to fire the Chief of the Naval General Staff, Admiral Osami Nagano, on the grounds of incompetence.

In June–July 1944, Japan was dealt a crushing blow in both the loss of Saipan and the defeat of its navy in the Battle of the Philippine Sea. The Philippine Sea engagement would come to be known as the "Great Marianas Turkey Shoot" by U.S. airmen after having shot down over 350 Japanese planes at the cost of only 30 of their own, thereby resulting in one of the biggest disasters in the Imperial Navy's history. Additionally, with Saipan in U.S. hands, the Americans were consequently in a position to build airbases in the Mariana Islands. With such bases in the Marianas, the cities of Japan were now well within the range of B-29 Superfortress bombers. As the news of the disastrous defeat suffered at Saipan reached Japan, elite opinion turned against the Tojo government.

After the Battle of Saipan, at least some of the Japanese elite had accepted the war was lost, and that Japan needed to make peace before the kokutai and the integrity of the throne itself were destroyed. The jushin (elder statesmen) had advised the Emperor that Tojo needed to go after Saipan and further advised the Emperor that the entire membership of his cabinet should be replaced. Aware of the intrigues to bring him down, Tojo sought to curry favor with the Emperor, only for the latter to send him a message stating he was unworthy of his approval after the disaster at Saipan. When Tojo attempted to reconcile himself with the throne by offering to reorganize his cabinet, the Emperor rejected this proposal and asserted that his entire government should leave power. Thereafter, the powerful and well-connect Lord Keeper of the Privy Seal, Marquis Kōichi Kido, spread word that the Emperor no longer supported Tojo. With his credibility all but extinguished in the eyes of the Japanese elite, Tojo was forced to resign on 18 July 1944, and it went into effect on 22 July.

== Arrest, trial, and execution ==
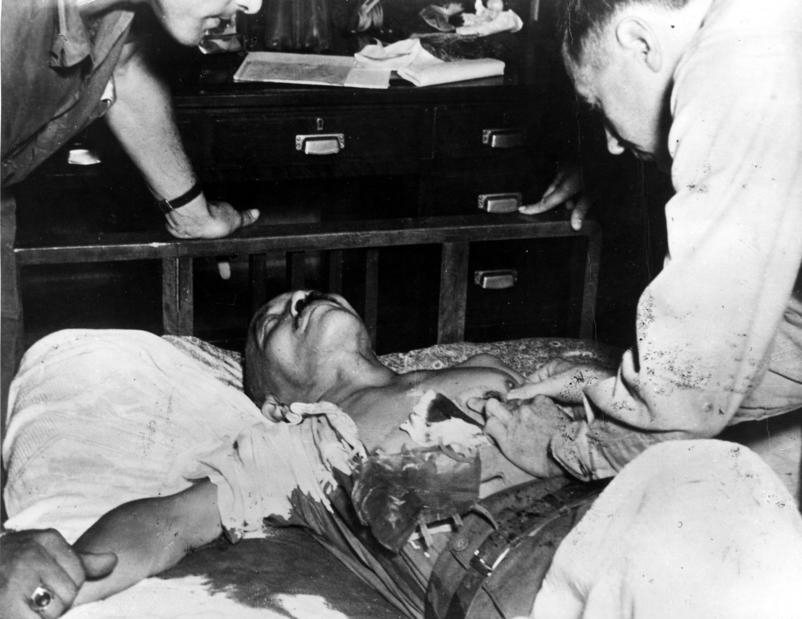
Tojo being resuscitated by American soldiers after his attempted suicide.

After Japan's unconditional surrender in 1945, U.S. general Douglas MacArthur ordered the arrest of 43 individuals suspected of war crimes, including Tojo. As American soldiers surrounded Tojo's house on 11 September, he shot himself in the chest with a pistol, but missed his heart.

As he bled, Tojo began to talk, and two Japanese reporters recorded his words: "I am very sorry it is taking me so long to die. The Greater East Asia War was justified and righteous. I am very sorry for the nation and all the races of the Greater Asiatic powers. I wait for the righteous judgment of history. I wished to commit suicide but sometimes that fails."

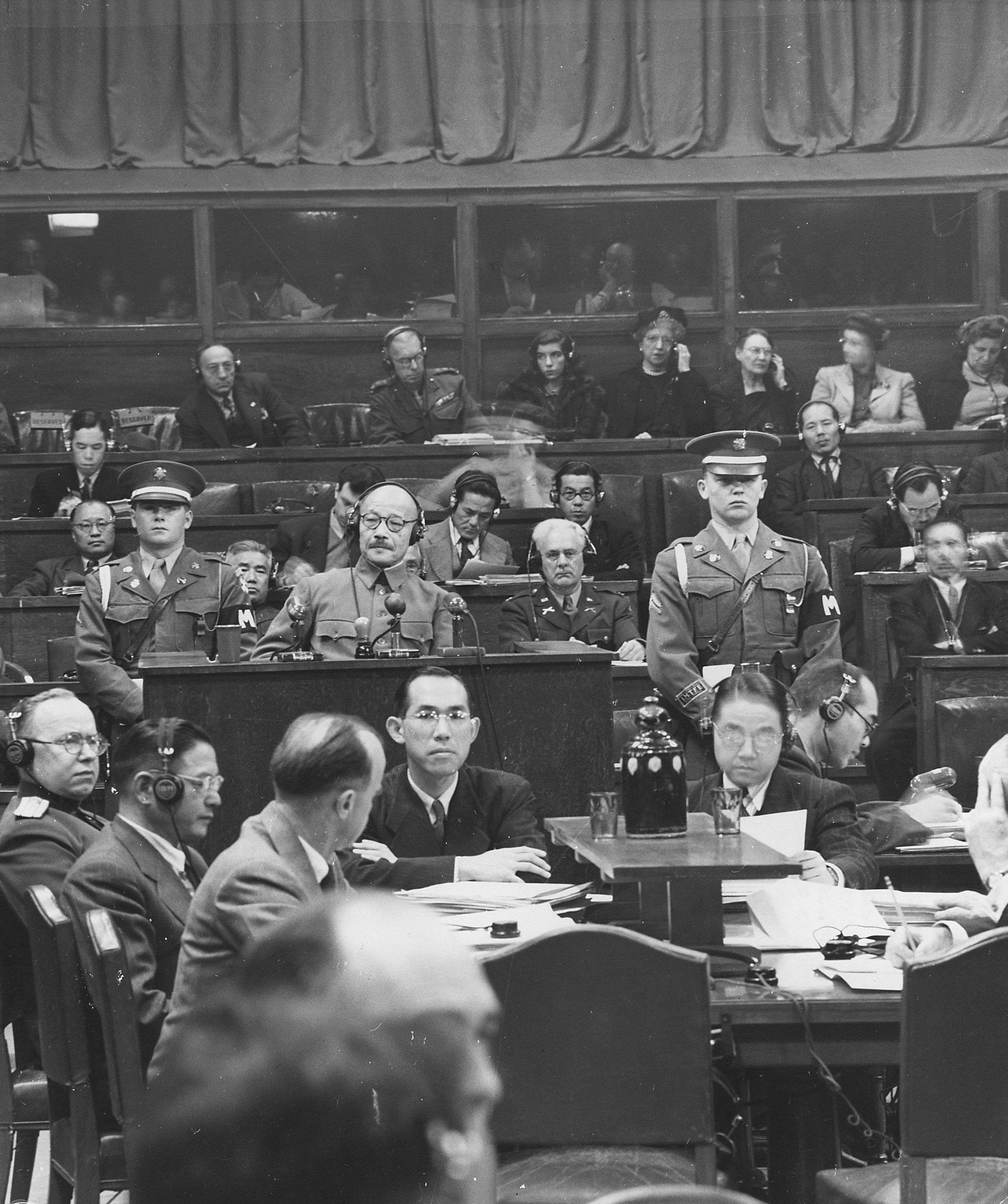
Tojo before the International Military Tribunal for the Far East

After recovering from his injuries, Tojo was moved to Sugamo Prison.

Tojo was tried by the International Military Tribunal for the Far East for war crimes. The trial began on April 29, 1946, with trial proceedings commencing on May 3. Twenty-seven other defendants were tried alongside Tojo. He was charged with waging wars of aggression; war in violation of international law; unprovoked or aggressive war against various nations; and ordering, authorizing, and permitting inhumane treatment of prisoners of war.

Crimes committed by the Empire of Japan were responsible for the deaths of millions (approximately 3 million according to historian R. J. Rummel) of civilians and prisoners of war through massacres, human experimentation, starvation, and forced labor that was either directly perpetrated or condoned by the Japanese military and government with a significant portion of them occurring during Tojo's rule of the military.

Tojo accepted full responsibility for his actions during the war and made this speech:

It is natural that I should bear entire responsibility for the war in general, and, needless to say, I am prepared to do so. Consequently, now that the war has been lost, it is presumably necessary that I be judged so that the circumstances of the time can be clarified and the future peace of the world be assured. Therefore, with respect to my trial, it is my intention to speak frankly, according to my recollection, even though when the vanquished stands before the victor, who has over him the power of life and death, he may be apt to toady and flatter. I mean to pay considerable attention to this in my actions, and say to the end that what is true is true and what is false is false. To shade one's words in flattery to the point of untruthfulness would falsify the trial and do incalculable harm to the nation, and great care must be taken to avoid this.

The Tribunal lasted just over two and a half years. Tojo was found guilty on 12 November 1948, and sentenced to death. He was executed by hanging 41 days later on 23 December 1948, a week before his 64th birthday. In his final statement, he apologized for the atrocities committed by the Japanese military and urged the American military to show compassion toward the Japanese people, who had suffered devastating air attacks and the two atomic bombings.

For years, there was mystery surrounding the fate of Tojo's remains. In 2021, the fate of his remains were declassified and published by the U.S. Army: after his execution, Tojo's body was cremated and his ashes were scattered over the Pacific Ocean approximately 30 miles (48 km) east of Yokohama from a US Army aircraft on the afternoon of 23 December 1948, along with the ashes of six other Class-A war criminals.

Historians Herbert P. Bix and John W. Dower criticize the work done by General MacArthur and his staff to exonerate Emperor Hirohito and all members of the imperial family from criminal prosecutions. According to them, MacArthur and Brigadier General Bonner Fellers worked to protect the Emperor and shift ultimate responsibility to Tojo.

According to the written report of Shūichi Mizota, interpreter for Admiral Mitsumasa Yonai, Fellers met the two men at his office on 6 March 1946, and told Yonai: "It would be most convenient if the Japanese side could prove to us that the Emperor is completely blameless. I think the forthcoming trials offer the best opportunity to do that. Tojo, in particular, should be made to bear all responsibility at this trial."

The sustained intensity of this campaign to protect the Emperor was revealed when, in testifying before the tribunal on 31 December 1947, Tojo momentarily strayed from the agreed-upon line concerning imperial innocence and referred to the Emperor's ultimate authority. The American-led prosecution immediately arranged that he be secretly coached to recant this testimony. Ryūkichi Tanaka, a former general who testified at the trial and had close connections with chief prosecutor Joseph B. Keenan, was used as an intermediary to persuade Tojo to revise his testimony.

== Legacy ==
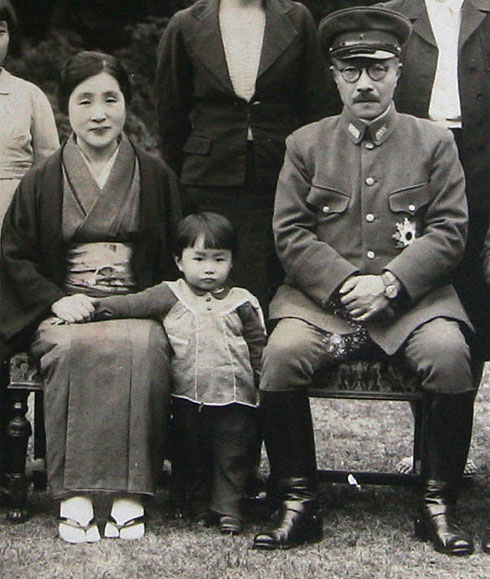
Tojo with wife Katsuko and granddaughter Yūko Tojo

Some of Tojo's ashes were stolen from the crematorium and are today buried at Mount Sangane and the Koa Kannon. His name is also enshrined at Yasukuni Shrine.

A number of his descendants survived, including his granddaughter, Yūko Tojo, who was a political hopeful who claimed Japan's war was one of self-defense and that it was unfair that her grandfather was judged a Class-A war criminal. Tojo's second son, Teruo Tojo, who designed fighter and passenger aircraft during and after the war, eventually served as an executive at Mitsubishi Heavy Industries.

A 1997 survey of university students in China asked, "When somebody talks about Japanese people, what person do you think of?" The answer that most gave was Tojo.

In the 1998 Japanese film Pride, Tojo was portrayed as a national hero forced into war by the West and then executed after a rigged trial.

== Bibliography ==
- Baudot, Marcel (1980). The Historical encyclopedia of World War II. Infobase Publishing. ISBN 978-0871964014.
- Bix, Herbert P. (2001). Hirohito and the making of modern Japan. HarperCollins. ISBN 978-0060931308.
- Browne, Courtney (1998). Tojo The Last Banzai. Boston: Da Capo Press. ISBN 0306808447.
- Butow, Robert Joseph Charles (1961). Tojo and the coming of the war. Stanford University Press. ISBN 978-0804706902.
- Coox, Alvin (1975). Tojo. Ballantine Books.
- Cowley, Robert; Parker, Geoffrey (2001). The Reader's Companion to Military History. Houghton Mifflin Harcourt. ISBN 978-0618127429.
- Crowe, David M. (2014). War Crimes, Genocide, and Justice: A Global History. New York: St. Martin's Press, LLC. ISBN 978-0230622241.
- Dear, I.C.B.; Foot, M.R.D., eds. (2001). The Oxford companion to World War II. Oxford University Press. ISBN 978-0198604464.
- Dower, John W. (2000). Embracing defeat: Japan in the wake of World War II. W. W. Norton & Company. ISBN 978-0393320275.
- Falk, Stanley (December 1961). "Organization and Military Power: The Japanese High Command in World War II". Political Science Quarterly. 76 (4): 503–518. doi:10.2307/2146538. JSTOR 2146538.
- Fredrikson, John C. (2001). America's military adversaries: from colonial times to the present. ABC-CLIO. ISBN 978-1576076033.
- Goodman, David G.; Miyazawa, Masanori (2000). Jews in the Japanese mind: the history and uses of a cultural stereotype. Lexington Books. ISBN 978-0739101674.
- Gorman, Jacqueline Laks (2009). Pearl Harbor: A Primary Source History. Gareth Stevens. ISBN 978-1433900471.
- Hata, Ikuhiko; Handō, Kazutoshi; Yokoyama, Keiichi; Hara, Takeshi (2010). Rekidai Rikugun Taishō Zenran – Shōwa Hen, Taiheiyō Sensōki [Complete List of All Army Generals – Shōwa Edition, Pacific War Period] (in Japanese). Tokyo: Chūō Kōron Shinsha.
- Hida, Hikari; Albeck-Ripka, Livia (16 June 2021). "70-Year Mystery Solved: Tojo's Ashes Were Scattered at Sea". New York Times.
- Hoyt, Edwin Palmer (1993). Warlord: Tojo Against the World. Scarborough House.
- Kafala, Tarik (21 October 2009). "What is a war crime?". BBC News.
- Kawamura, Noriko (2015). Emperor Hirohito and the Pacific War. University of Washington Press.
- Kristof, Nicholas (November–December 1998). "The Problem of Memory". Foreign Affairs. 77 (6): 37–49. doi:10.2307/20049129. JSTOR 20049129.
- Lamont-Brown, Raymond (1988). Kempeitai: Japan's dreaded military police. The History Press. ISBN 978-0750915663.
- Mauch, Peter (2026). Tojo: The Rise and Fall of Japan's Most Controversial World War II General. Harvard University Press.
- Montefiore, Simon Sebag (2008). History's Monsters: 101 Villains from Vlad the Impaler to Adolf Hitler. Metro Books.
- Murray, Williamson; Millet, Alan (2000). A War To Be Won: Fighting the Second World War. Cambridge: Harvard University Press. ISBN 0674006801.
- Nordlinger, Jay (2015). Children of monsters : an inquiry into the sons and daughters of dictators. New York: Encounter Books.
- Parry, Richard Lloyd (12 June 2021). "Ashes of war leaders were scattered at sea by US". The Times.
- Ruane, Michael (10 September 2020). "How the Army and the media broke up a Japanese war criminal's suicide attempt". The Washington Post.
- Rummel, RJ (1998). Statistics of Democide: Genocide and Mass Murder since 1900. Transaction Publishers.
- Takemae, Eiji; Ricketts, Robert (2003). The Allied Occupation of Japan. Continuum International Publishing Group. ISBN 978-0826415219.
- Theotokis, Nikolaos (2024). Imprisoning the Enemy: How 12 million Axis POWs were held in captivity during WW2 and after. Pen & Sword Books.
- Toland, John (1970). The Rising Sun: The Decline and Fall of the Japanese Empire, 1936–1945. New York: Random House. LCCN 77117669.
- Townsend, Gregory (2012). "Structure and Management". In Luc Reydams, Jan Wouters, Cedric Ryngaert (ed.). International Prosecutors. Oxford: Oxford University Press.
- Weinberg, Gerhard (2005). A World In Arms A Global History of World War II. Cambridge: Cambridge University Press. ISBN 978-0521618267.
- Wetzler, Peter (1998). Hirohito and war: imperial tradition and military decision making in prewar Japan. University of Hawaii Press. ISBN 978-0824819255.
- Willmott, H.P. (1984). June 1944. Poole, UK: Blandford Press. ISBN 0713714468.
- Yenne, Bill (2014). The Imperial Japanese Army: The Invincible Years 1941–42. Oxford, UK: Osprey Publishing. ISBN 978-1782009320.
- Yoshimi, Yoshiaki (2000). Comfort Women: Sexual Slavery in the Japanese Military During World War II. New York: Columbia University Press. ISBN 0231120338.
- Yoshinobu, Higurashi (25 November 2013). "Yasukuni and the Enshrinement of War Criminals". Nippon.com.

Political offices
Preceded by Shunroku Hata	Minister of the Army; 1940–1944	Succeeded by Hajime Sugiyama
Preceded by Fumimaro Konoe	Prime Minister of Japan; 1941–1944	Succeeded by Kuniaki Koiso
Preceded by Harumichi Tanabe	Minister of Home Affairs; 1941–1942	Succeeded by Michio Yuzawa
Preceded by Shigenori Tōgō	Minister of Foreign Affairs; 1942	Succeeded by Masayuki Tani
Preceded by Kunihiko Hashida	Minister of Education; 1942	Succeeded by Nagakage Okabe
Preceded by Nobusuke Kishi	Minister of Commerce and Industry; 1943	Office abolished
New creation	Minister of Munitions; 1943–1944	Succeeded by Ginjirō Fujiwara
Military offices
Preceded by Hajime Sugiyama	Chief of Army General Staff; 1944	Succeeded by Yoshijirō Umezu
