= Kazuhito Futagami =

Japanese baseball player (born 1987)

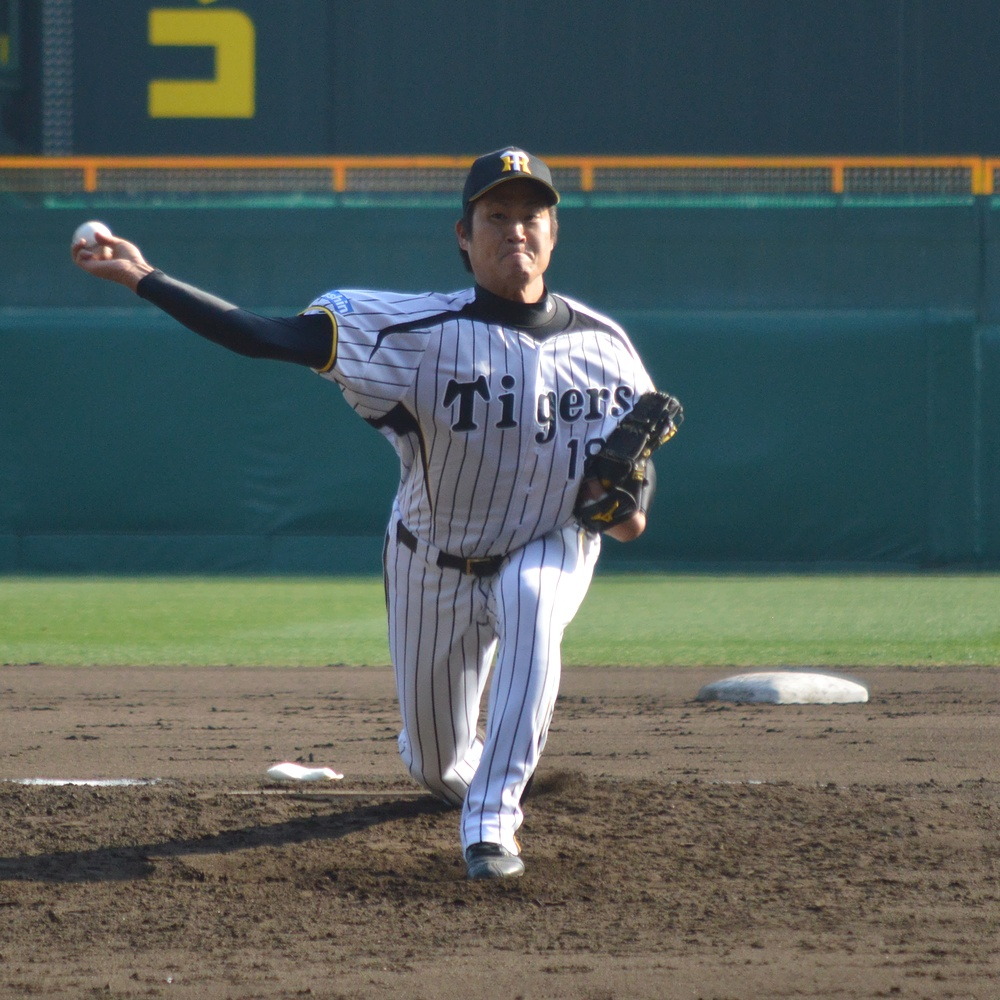
- Futagami with the Hanshin Tigers in 2013
- Pitcher
- Born: June 3, 1987 (age 38)
- Bats: Right Throws: Right

debut
- 2012, for the Hanshin Tigers

Career statistics (through 2014)
- Games: 11
- Innings Pitched: 14.1
- ERA: 8.79
- Stats at Baseball Reference

Teams
- Hanshin Tigers (2012, 2014–2015)

Kazuhito Futagami (Japanese 二神 一人; born 3 June 1987) is a Japanese professional baseball pitcher who currently plays for the Hanshin Tigers of Nippon Professional Baseball.
