= Shoya Tōjō =

Japanese footballer

Shoya Tojo
Personal information
- Date of birth: 15 November 1995 (age 30)
- Place of birth: Itabashi City, Japan
- Position: Winger

Team information
- Current team: Vitória Sernache
- Number: 23

Youth career
- 2013: Mito HollyHock
- 2014: Friburguense

Senior career*
Years	Team	Apps	(Gls)
2015–2019	Marítimo B	65	(1)
2019–	Vitória Sernache	19	(3)
- * Club domestic league appearances and goals as of 13:54, 3 May 2020 (UTC)

Shoya Tōjō (東条 庄や, Tōjō Shōya; born 15 November 1995) is a Japanese footballer who plays as a winger for GD Vitória de Sernache.

== Career ==
Tōjō made his professional debut in the Segunda Liga for Marítimo B on 17 May 2015 in a game against Sporting B.
