= Yuko Tojo =

Japanese politician (1939–2013)

- 東條 由布子
- Tojo in 1941
- Born: Yoshie Tojo; 20 May 1939; Keijō, Japanese Korea
- Died: 13 February 2013 (aged 73); Tokyo, Japan
- Other names: Yoshie Iwanami; Yuko Iwanami
- Education: Kokushikan University
- Occupations: Politician, Insurance agent
- Employer: Dai-Ichi Insurance Company
- Known for: granddaughter of Hideki Tojo
- Children: 4
- Relatives: Hidetaka Tojo (father); Hideki Tojo (grandfather)

Yuko Tojo (東條 由布子, Tōjō Yūko; 20 May 1939 – 13 February 2013) was a Japanese ultra-nationalist politician, Imperial Japanese apologist, and brief political aspirant. She was the granddaughter of convicted war criminal Hideki Tojo.

== Politics ==
In May 2007, Tojo revealed her intention to run in the House of Councillors election at the age of 68. She ran on a far-right platform. Tojo denied Japanese war crimes during the Second Sino-Japanese War and World War II.

Tojo was a patron of The Truth About Nanjing, a movie by filmmaker Satoru Mizushima widely considered to advocate for denial or revisionism of the Nanjing Massacre. Mizushima alleges that the 1937 Nanjing Massacre was a politically motivated fabrication by China and numerous western eyewitnesses.

Japan's nationalists, including former Prime Minister Shinzō Abe, distanced themselves from her. Political commentator Minoru Morita has said of her: "Tojo’s nationalistic attitude might appeal to certain elements of the population, but most Japanese do not sympathize with her views. She has no chance at all at the elections."

== Death ==
Tojo died on 13 February 2013, from interstitial pneumonia at the age of 73, ten years after her entry into politics.

== Quotes ==
"Japan did not fight a war of aggression. It fought in self-defense. Our children have been wrongly taught that their ancestors did evil things, that their country is evil. We need to give these children back their pride and confidence".

"In Japan, there are no war criminals. Every one of those enshrined at Yasukuni died fighting for their country, and we should honor them".

"Many people, including Kyuma, believe that the atomic bombs stopped Japan's 'aggression,' but Japan did not fight a war of aggression". "If there was one mistake, however, it was the fact that we lost. And if my grandfather is to blame, it's not because he started the war but because we lost".

"People think I'm a hawk, but I'm actually a dove on the torii of Yasukuni Shrine".
