= List of members of the House of Representatives of Japan, 1937–1942 =

This is a list of Representatives elected to the House of Representatives of Japan at the 1937 general election and served during the 1937–1942 term.

== Elected Representatives ==
List of members of the House of Representatives elected in 1937
Constituency	Elected Members	Elected Party	Notes
Hokkaido-1st	Kōzō Yamamoto	Rikken Minseitō	
Hokkaido-1st	Junsuke Itaya	Rikken Seiyūkai	
Hokkaido-1st	Rikichi Sawada	Rikken Minseitō	
Hokkaido-1st	Nakajirō Ichiyanagi	Rikken Minseitō	
Hokkaido-2nd	Takeshi Azuma	Rikken Seiyūkai	
Hokkaido-2nd	Roichi Hayashi	Shōwakai	
Hokkaido-2nd	Kōtarō Bandō	Rikken Minseitō	
Hokkaido-2nd	Shūtarō Matsuura	Rikken Minseitō	
Hokkaido-3rd	Torakichi Ōshima	Rikken Minseitō	
Hokkaido-3rd	Yasukuni Watanabe	Tōhōkai	
Hokkaido-3rd	Shōji Tashiro	Rikken Seiyūkai	
Hokkaido-4th	Katsumaro Akamatsu	Political Renovation Conference	
Hokkaido-4th	Ryūkichi Teshirogi	Rikken Minseitō	
Hokkaido-4th	Katsutarō Kita	Independent	
Hokkaido-4th	Haruo Okada	Rikken Minseitō	
Hokkaido-4th	Tokuo Nanjō	Rikken Seiyūkai	
Hokkaido-5th	Fusakichi Tōyama	Rikken Minseitō	
Hokkaido-5th	Shigetarō Kinoshita	Rikken Seiyūkai	
Hokkaido-5th	Tei Tōjō	Rikken Seiyūkai	
Hokkaido-5th	Seisaku Nagumo	Rikken Minseitō	
Aomori-1st	Yasomi Ogasawara	Rikken Seiyūkai	
Aomori-1st	Tetsuo Kudō	Rikken Minseitō	
Aomori-1st	Jūjirō Morita	Rikken Minseitō	
Aomori-2nd	Ken'ichi Ono	Tōhōkai	
Aomori-2nd	Tosao Kudō	Rikken Seiyūkai	
Aomori-2nd	Ryūichi Kikuchi	Rikken Minseitō	
Iwate-1st	Ichimin Tago	Rikken Seiyūkai	
Iwate-1st	Jutarō Takahashi	Rikken Minseitō	
Iwate-1st	Saburō Yasumi	Rikken Seiyūkai	
Iwate-2nd	Kunisaburō Izumi	Rikken Seiyūkai	
Iwate-2nd	Shōzō Matsukawa	Rikken Seiyūkai	
Iwate-2nd	Yūsuke Tsurumi	Rikken Minseitō	
Iwate-2nd	Watari Shiga	Rikken Seiyūkai	
Miyagi-1st	Sakusaburō Uchigasaki	Rikken Minseitō	
Miyagi-1st	Yōnosuke Kikuchi	Shakai Taishūtō	
Miyagi-1st	Ichirō Shōji	Rikken Seiyūkai	
Miyagi-1st	Eifu Moriya	Shōwakai	
Miyagi-1st	Den Sugawara	Rikken Seiyūkai	
Miyagi-2nd	Hisayoshi Muramatsu	Rikken Minseitō	
Miyagi-2nd	Kuranosuke Oyama	Rikken Minseitō	
Miyagi-2nd	Rinji Ōishi	Rikken Seiyūkai	
Akita-1st	Chūji Machida	Rikken Minseitō	
Akita-1st	Giemon Shida	Rikken Minseitō	
Akita-1st	Gichoku Nakata	Rikken Seiyūkai	
Akita-1st	Shigeharu Nakagawa	Rikken Minseitō	
Akita-2nd	Seion Kawamata	Shakai Taishūtō	
Akita-2nd	Yoshitaka Oyamada	Rikken Seiyūkai	
Akita-2nd	Sōsuke Tsuchida	Rikken Minseitō	
Yamagata-1st	Takeo Kimura	Tōhōkai	
Yamagata-1st	Kumajirō Takahashi	Rikken Seiyūkai	
Yamagata-1st	Toshima Nishikata	Rikken Seiyūkai	
Yamagata-1st	Hiraku Satō	Kokumin Dōmei	
Yamagata-2nd	Toshizō Matsuoka	Rikken Seiyūkai	
Yamagata-2nd	Naota Kumagai	Rikken Seiyūkai	
Yamagata-2nd	Gorō Itō	Rikken Minseitō	
Yamagata-2nd	Tokutarō Shizumi	Rikken Minseitō	
Fukushima-1st	Hiroshi Momiyama	Rikken Minseitō	
Fukushima-1st	Morio Kugimoto	Rikken Minseitō	
Fukushima-1st	Zen'emon Kanno	Rikken Seiyūkai	
Fukushima-2nd	Sōkichi Hatta	Rikken Seiyūkai	
Fukushima-2nd	Saburō Nakanishi	Rikken Minseitō	
Fukushima-2nd	Keishirō Sukekawa	Rikken Seiyūkai	
Fukushima-2nd	Torakichi Nakano	Shōwakai	
Fukushima-2nd	Heima Hayashi	Rikken Minseitō	
Fukushima-3rd	Shōhei Hisa	Rikken Minseitō	
Fukushima-3rd	Hajime Hoshi	Independent	
Fukushima-3rd	Rokurō Yamada	Rikken Minseitō	
Ibaraki-1st	Nobuya Uchida	Shōwakai	
Ibaraki-1st	Toshihide Nakazaki	Rikken Minseitō	
Ibaraki-1st	Toyokichi Toyota	Rikken Minseitō	
Ibaraki-1st	Shingorō Hanashi	Rikken Seiyūkai	
Ibaraki-2nd	Hiroshi Nakaigawa	Rikken Minseitō	
Ibaraki-2nd	Minotarō Kawasaki	Rikken Seiyūkai	
Ibaraki-2nd	Takenosuke Ōuchi	Rikken Seiyūkai	
Ibaraki-3rd	Akira Kazami	Independent	
Ibaraki-3rd	Munenori Akagi	Independent	
Ibaraki-3rd	Yōnosuke Satō	Rikken Seiyūkai	
Ibaraki-3rd	Gorō Iimura	Shōwakai	
Tochigi-1st	Naka Funada	Rikken Seiyūkai	
Tochigi-1st	Unpei Takada	Rikken Minseitō	
Tochigi-1st	Torakichi Ishiyama	Shakai Taishūtō	
Tochigi-1st	Saburō Ehara	Rikken Seiyūkai	
Tochigi-1st	Kikuji Okada	Rikken Minseitō	
Tochigi-2nd	Kunio Morishita	Rikken Minseitō	
Tochigi-2nd	Kōzō Matsumura	Rikken Seiyūkai	
Tochigi-2nd	Jūkichi Odaira	Rikken Seiyūkai	
Tochigi-2nd	Asashichi Kimura	Rikken Minseitō	
Gunma-1st	Chikuhei Nakajima	Rikken Seiyūkai	
Gunma-1st	Seiichi Aoki	Shōwakai	
Gunma-1st	Kō Sunaga	Shakai Taishūtō	
Gunma-1st	Harutarō Iizuka	Rikken Minseitō	
Gunma-1st	Tomesaburō Shizumi	Rikken Minseitō	
Gunma-2nd	Yoshimasa Shinohara	Rikken Seiyūkai	
Gunma-2nd	Masazō Mogami	Rikken Minseitō	
Gunma-2nd	Sanshirō Kogure	Rikken Seiyūkai	
Gunma-2nd	Budayū Kogure	Rikken Seiyūkai	
Saitama-1st	Tō Matsunaga	Rikken Minseitō	
Saitama-1st	Hajime Miyazaki	Rikken Seiyūkai	
Saitama-1st	Yasuo Takahashi	Rikken Seiyūkai	
Saitama-1st	Yoshio Matsunaga	Shakai Taishūtō	
Saitama-2nd	Morihei Takahashi	Rikken Minseitō	
Saitama-2nd	Jūji Yokokawa	Rikken Seiyūkai	
Saitama-2nd	Yōhei Ishizaka	Rikken Seiyūkai	
Saitama-2nd	Sōtarō Sakamoto	Independent	
Saitama-3rd	Tetsuya Nonaka	Kokumin Dōmei	
Saitama-3rd	Hyōkichi Idei	Rikken Seiyūkai	
Saitama-3rd	Yoshihide Furushima	Rikken Minseitō	
Chiba-1st	Mitsunaga Tada	Rikken Minseitō	
Chiba-1st	Rokurō Shinohara	Rikken Minseitō	
Chiba-1st	Isamu Narushima	Rikken Minseitō	
Chiba-1st	Shōjirō Kawashima	Rikken Seiyūkai	
Chiba-2nd	Takehiko Imai	Rikken Seiyūkai	
Chiba-2nd	Shōryō Yoshiue	Rikken Seiyūkai	
Chiba-2nd	Shirō Uga	Rikken Minseitō	
Chiba-3rd	Akira Iwase	Rikken Seiyūkai	
Chiba-3rd	Chōsaburō Odaka	Rikken Seiyūkai	
Chiba-3rd	Seisaburō Tsuchiya	Rikken Minseitō	
Chiba-3rd	Seishū Ikeda	Rikken Minseitō	
Tokyo-1st	Mitsu Kōno	Shakai Taishūtō	
Tokyo-1st	Tamashige Hara	Rikken Minseitō	
Tokyo-1st	Yoshitsugu Takahashi	Rikken Minseitō	
Tokyo-1st	Seiichirō Dōke	Independent	
Tokyo-1st	Yoshinari Honda	Rikken Seiyūkai	
Tokyo-2nd	Isoo Abe	Shakai Taishūtō	
Tokyo-2nd	Ichirō Hatoyama	Rikken Seiyūkai	
Tokyo-2nd	Yadanji Nakajima	Rikken Minseitō	
Tokyo-2nd	Jūji Komai	Rikken Minseitō	
Tokyo-2nd	Takaichi Nagano	Rikken Minseitō	
Tokyo-3rd	Keikichi Tanomogi	Rikken Minseitō	
Tokyo-3rd	Inejirō Asanuma	Shakai Taishūtō	
Tokyo-3rd	Daikichirō Tagawa	Independent	
Tokyo-3rd	Masazumi Andō	Rikken Seiyūkai	
Tokyo-4th	Shigeo Abe	Shakai Taishūtō	
Tokyo-4th	Gijū Manabe	Rikken Minseitō	
Tokyo-4th	Shichirō Takizawa	Rikken Seiyūkai	
Tokyo-4th	Park Chun-geum	Independent	
Tokyo-5th	Hisashi Asō	Shakai Taishūtō	
Tokyo-5th	Kanjū Katō	Japan Proletarian Party	
Tokyo-5th	Teikichi Shiba	Rikken Minseitō	
Tokyo-5th	Jusō Miwa	Shakai Taishūtō	
Tokyo-5th	Shizuo Makino	Rikken Seiyūkai	
Tokyo-6th	Bunji Suzuki	Shakai Taishūtō	
Tokyo-6th	Yonezō Maeda	Rikken Seiyūkai	
Tokyo-6th	Kiyoshi Yamada	Rikken Minseitō	
Tokyo-6th	Umekichi Nakamura	Rikken Minseitō	
Tokyo-6th	Gen Tanaka	Rikken Seiyūkai	
Tokyo-7th	Takeji Yatsunami	Rikken Minseitō	
Tokyo-7th	Takaichi Nakamura	Shakai Taishūtō	
Tokyo-7th	Kunitoshi Tsukumo	Rikken Seiyūkai	
Kanagawa-1st	Ken Okazaki	Shakai Taishūtō	
Kanagawa-1st	Sukeo Iida	Rikken Minseitō	
Kanagawa-1st	Jirō Nogata	Rikken Seiyūkai	
Kanagawa-2nd	Matajirō Koizumi	Rikken Minseitō	
Kanagawa-2nd	Tetsu Katayama	Shakai Taishūtō	
Kanagawa-2nd	Seiichi Ogushi	Rikken Seiyūkai	
Kanagawa-2nd	Kiichi Noguchi	Rikken Seiyūkai	
Kanagawa-3rd	Ichirō Kōno	Rikken Seiyūkai	
Kanagawa-3rd	Matsutarō Hirakawa	Rikken Minseitō	
Kanagawa-3rd	Hideo Suzuki	Rikken Seiyūkai	
Kanagawa-3rd	Kyūjirō Okazaki	Rikken Minseitō	
Niigata-1st	Reikichi Kita	Rikken Minseitō	
Niigata-1st	Teijirō Yamamoto	Rikken Seiyūkai	
Niigata-1st	Gunji Matsui	Rikken Minseitō	
Niigata-2nd	Daisuke Takaoka	Kokumin Dōmei	
Niigata-2nd	Yoichi Satō	Rikken Minseitō	
Niigata-2nd	Hiromu Matsuki	Rikken Seiyūkai	
Niigata-2nd	Makie Koyanagi	Rikken Minseitō	
Niigata-3rd	Shōichi Miyake	Shakai Taishūtō	
Niigata-3rd	Kan'ichi Ōtake	Kokumin Dōmei	
Niigata-3rd	Chisei Katō	Rikken Seiyūkai	
Niigata-3rd	Tomenosuke Imanari	Rikken Minseitō	
Niigata-3rd	Kennosuke Satō	Rikken Minseitō	
Niigata-4th	Tokusaburō Takeda	Rikken Seiyūkai	
Niigata-4th	Giichi Masuda	Rikken Minseitō	
Niigata-4th	Naoji Kawai	Rikken Minseitō	
Toyama-1st	Yukimichi Takami	Rikken Seiyūkai	
Toyama-1st	Gonzō Terashima	Rikken Minseitō	
Toyama-1st	Karoku Nomura	Rikken Minseitō	
Toyama-2nd	Kitarō Uota	Rikken Minseitō	
Toyama-2nd	Kenzō Matsumura	Rikken Minseitō	
Toyama-2nd	Sōmei Tsuchikura	Rikken Seiyūkai	
Ishikawa-1st	Ryūtarō Nagai	Rikken Minseitō	
Ishikawa-1st	Chōji Hase	Independent	
Ishikawa-1st	Takichi Hashimoto	Rikken Seiyūkai	
Ishikawa-2nd	Hyōgorō Sakurai	Rikken Minseitō	
Ishikawa-2nd	Kenzō Aoyama	Rikken Seiyūkai	
Ishikawa-2nd	Sōichirō Kita	Rikken Minseitō	
Fukui	Toshie Inoke	Rikken Seiyūkai	
Fukui	Keiichirō Soeda	Rikken Minseitō	
Fukui	Hichirōbei Ikeda	Rikken Seiyūkai	
Fukui	Naokitsu Saitō	Rikken Minseitō	
Fukui	Gouemon Kumagai	Shōwakai	
Yamanashi	Shichiroku Tanabe	Rikken Seiyūkai	
Yamanashi	Rikizō Hirano	Kōdōkai	
Yamanashi	Jūji Kasai	Independent	
Yamanashi	Ryōhei Horiuchi	Rikken Minseitō	
Yamanashi	Shinzō Imai	Meirinkai	
Nagano-1st	Tadao Matsumoto	Rikken Minseitō	
Nagano-1st	Bensaburō Maruyama	Rikken Seiyūkai	
Nagano-1st	Kuniji Tanaka	Rikken Minseitō	
Nagano-2nd	Kunitarō Oyama	Rikken Minseitō	
Nagano-2nd	Makoto Oyama	Independent	
Nagano-2nd	Bushirō Hata	Rikken Seiyūkai	
Nagano-3rd	Taneo Miyazawa	Rikken Minseitō	
Nagano-3rd	Achinosuke Kitahara	Rikken Minseitō	
Nagano-3rd	Kinji Nakahara	Political Renovation Conference	
Nagano-3rd	Masaru Nomizo	Shakai Taishūtō	
Nagano-4th	Etsujirō Uehara	Rikken Seiyūkai	
Nagano-4th	Wataru Momose	Rikken Minseitō	
Nagano-4th	Kō Tanaka	Rikken Yōseikai	
Gifu-1st	Kan Kiyoshi	Rikken Minseitō	
Gifu-1st	Eikichi Hikita	Rikken Seiyūkai	
Gifu-1st	Banboku Ōno	Rikken Seiyūkai	
Gifu-2nd	Sakujirō Kimura	Rikken Seiyūkai	
Gifu-2nd	Tōichirō Itō	Rikken Minseitō	
Gifu-2nd	Takeo Mitamura	Tōhōkai	
Gifu-3rd	Ryōzō Makino	Rikken Seiyūkai	
Gifu-3rd	Yoshitaka Furuya	Rikken Minseitō	
Gifu-3rd	Ryōzō Katō	Shakai Taishūtō	
Shizuoka-1st	Junsaku Yamada	Rikken Minseitō	
Shizuoka-1st	Toyotarō Fukazawa	Rikken Seiyūkai	
Shizuoka-1st	Chūgorō Yamaguchi	Rikken Seiyūkai	
Shizuoka-1st	Mitsuo Hirano	Rikken Minseitō	
Shizuoka-1st	Yūichirō Miyamoto	Rikken Seiyūkai	
Shizuoka-2nd	Kenji Yamazaki	Shakai Taishūtō	
Shizuoka-2nd	Shōzō Shiokawa	Rikken Seiyūkai	
Shizuoka-2nd	Kumetarō Takagi	Rikken Minseitō	
Shizuoka-2nd	Seishō Haruna	Shōwakai	
Shizuoka-3rd	Masataka Ōta	Rikken Seiyūkai	
Shizuoka-3rd	Kamesaku Tsukura	Rikken Minseitō	
Shizuoka-3rd	Yōichi Kuramoto	Rikken Seiyūkai	
Shizuoka-3rd	Sen'ichirō Sakashita	Rikken Minseitō	
Aichi-1st	Zō Tsukamoto	Rikken Minseitō	
Aichi-1st	Shōju Koyama	Rikken Minseitō	
Aichi-1st	Sakiichi Hattori	Rikken Minseitō	
Aichi-1st	Benkyō Shiio	Independent	
Aichi-1st	Tsunekichi Yamazaki	Political Renovation Conference	
Aichi-2nd	Kōzō Andō	Independent	
Aichi-2nd	Zen'uemon Higuchi	Rikken Seiyūkai	
Aichi-2nd	Mojūrō Tange	Rikken Seiyūkai	
Aichi-3rd	Chōichi Katō	Rikken Minseitō	
Aichi-3rd	Masao Taki	Independent	
Aichi-3rd	Tamasaburō Watanabe	Rikken Minseitō	
Aichi-4th	Ichizō Ōno	Rikken Minseitō	
Aichi-4th	Jitsutarō Okamoto	Rikken Minseitō	
Aichi-4th	Sankurō Ogasawara	Rikken Seiyūkai	
Aichi-5th	Shōgo Suzuki	Kokumin Dōmei	
Aichi-5th	Kiroku Ōguchi	Rikken Seiyūkai	
Aichi-5th	Takeo Sugiura	Tōhōkai	
Mie-1st	Kumeshirō Katō	Rikken Seiyūkai	
Mie-1st	Masakazu Matsuda	Rikken Minseitō	
Mie-1st	Tsunekazu Kataoka	Rikken Minseitō	
Mie-1st	Katsu Kawasaki	Rikken Minseitō	
Mie-1st	Jirō Umaoka	Rikken Seiyūkai	
Mie-2nd	Yukio Ozaki	Independent	
Mie-2nd	Bunpei Hamachi	Rikken Seiyūkai	
Mie-2nd	Gen Nagai	Rikken Minseitō	
Mie-2nd	Kunimatsu Hamada	Rikken Seiyūkai	
Shiga	Yasujirō Tsutsumi	Rikken Minseitō	
Shiga	Ryōkan Aoki	Rikken Minseitō	
Shiga	Kōtarō Mori	Rikken Seiyūkai	
Shiga	Yōtatsu Tanaka	Tōhōkai	
Shiga	Iwakichi Hattori	Rikken Seiyūkai	
Kyoto-1st	Chōsaburō Mizutani	Shakai Taishūtō	
Kyoto-1st	Sannojō Nakamura	Rikken Minseitō	
Kyoto-1st	Sekijirō Fukuda	Rikken Minseitō	
Kyoto-1st	Kinzaburō Nishimura	Rikken Minseitō	
Kyoto-1st	Naozaburō Era	Rikken Seiyūkai	
Kyoto-2nd	Suegorō Kawasaki	Rikken Minseitō	
Kyoto-2nd	Jinshirō Ikemoto	Rikken Minseitō	
Kyoto-2nd	Kō Tanaka	Rikken Seiyūkai	
Kyoto-3rd	Hitoshi Ashida	Rikken Seiyūkai	
Kyoto-3rd	Takeshi Tsuhara	Rikken Minseitō	
Kyoto-3rd	Kunikichi Murakami	Rikken Minseitō	
Osaka-1st	Kiyoomi Taman	Shakai Taishūtō	
Osaka-1st	Tomozō Itano	Rikken Seiyūkai	
Osaka-1st	Sadayoshi Hitotsumatsu	Rikken Minseitō	
Osaka-2nd	Shinkurō Murayasu	Rikken Minseitō	
Osaka-2nd	Yoshiji Yamamoto	Rikken Seiyūkai	
Osaka-2nd	Ryōji Inoue	Shakai Taishūtō	
Osaka-3rd	Jūzō Tsukamoto	Shakai Taishūtō	
Osaka-3rd	Tadayoshi Ikezaki	Independent	
Osaka-3rd	Masatake Naitō	Rikken Minseitō	
Osaka-3rd	Kōkichi Ueda	Rikken Seiyūkai	
Osaka-4th	Yasutarō Kawamura	Shakai Taishūtō	
Osaka-4th	Suehiro Nishio	Shakai Taishūtō	
Osaka-4th	Fukuzō Nakayama	Rikken Minseitō	
Osaka-4th	Yaichirō Honda	Rikken Minseitō	
Osaka-5th	Motojirō Sugiyama	Shakai Taishūtō	
Osaka-5th	Eikichi Katsuta	Rikken Minseitō	
Osaka-5th	Man'itsu Tanaka	Rikken Minseitō	
Osaka-5th	Giichi Sowa	Rikken Seiyūkai	
Osaka-6th	Toyomitsu Isaka	Shōwakai	
Osaka-6th	Takechiyo Matsuda	Rikken Minseitō	
Osaka-6th	Teizō Minami	Rikken Seiyūkai	
Hyōgo-1st	Jōtarō Kawakami	Shakai Taishūtō	
Hyōgo-1st	Kazuo Nakai	Rikken Seiyūkai	
Hyōgo-1st	Kazuo Nagae	Shakai Taishūtō	
Hyōgo-1st	Bun'ichirō Noda	Rikken Minseitō	
Hyōgo-1st	Tetsutarō Hamano	Rikken Minseitō	
Hyōgo-2nd	Fusanosuke Maeda	Rikken Minseitō	
Hyōgo-2nd	Mitsusuke Yonekubo	Shakai Taishūtō	
Hyōgo-2nd	Fusanosuke Kobayashi	Rikken Minseitō	
Hyōgo-2nd	Osamu Tatsukawa	Rikken Seiyūkai	
Hyōgo-3rd	Kinuji Kobayashi	Rikken Seiyūkai	
Hyōgo-3rd	Giichi Kawai	Shakai Taishūtō	
Hyōgo-3rd	Gensaburō Tanaka	Rikken Seiyūkai	
Hyōgo-4th	Ichirō Kiyose	Kokumin Dōmei	
Hyōgo-4th	Takeo Tanaka	Rikken Minseitō	
Hyōgo-4th	Sōbee Hara	Rikken Seiyūkai	
Hyōgo-4th	Toranosuke Kobata	Rikken Minseitō	
Hyōgo-5th	Takao Saitō	Rikken Minseitō	
Hyōgo-5th	Sadao Wakamiya	Rikken Seiyūkai	
Hyōgo-5th	Yorisaburō Yamakawa	Rikken Seiyūkai	
Nara	Genkurō Etō	Political Renovation Conference	
Nara	Jinzō Fukui	Rikken Seiyūkai	
Nara	Eizō Mori	Rikken Seiyūkai	
Nara	Shirō Matsuo	Rikken Minseitō	
Nara	Itsurō Yagi	Rikken Minseitō	
Wakayama-1st	Tsunejirō Matsuyama	Rikken Seiyūkai	
Wakayama-1st	Shūichirō Kimoto	Rikken Seiyūkai	
Wakayama-1st	Ikuhei Nishida	Rikken Minseitō	
Wakayama-2nd	Tanizō Koyama	Rikken Minseitō	
Wakayama-2nd	Toyokichi Tabuchi	Independent	
Wakayama-2nd	Kōichi Sekō	Rikken Seiyūkai	
Tottori	Naomichi Inada	Rikken Seiyūkai	
Tottori	Norishige Yamamasu	Rikken Minseitō	
Tottori	Hideyuki Miyoshi	Rikken Minseitō	
Tottori	Osamu Toyoda	Shōwakai	
Shimane-1st	Yukio Sakurauchi	Rikken Minseitō	
Shimane-1st	Fujirō Hara	Rikken Minseitō	
Shimane-1st	Enzaburō Takahashi	Rikken Seiyūkai	
Shimane-2nd	Toshio Shimada	Rikken Seiyūkai	
Shimane-2nd	Magoichi Tawara	Rikken Minseitō	
Shimane-2nd	Kamazō Okishima	Rikken Seiyūkai	
Okayama-1st	Tomoyuki Kuyama	Rikken Seiyūkai	
Okayama-1st	Tadahiko Okada	Rikken Seiyūkai	
Okayama-1st	Kakuji Yukiyoshi	Rikken Seiyūkai	
Okayama-1st	Hisao Kuroda	Shakai Taishūtō	
Okayama-1st	Tomoyoshi Tamano	Shōwakai	
Okayama-2nd	Gōtarō Ogawa	Rikken Minseitō	
Okayama-2nd	Tanjirō Nishimura	Rikken Minseitō	
Okayama-2nd	Takeru Inukai	Rikken Seiyūkai	
Okayama-2nd	Nirō Hoshishima	Rikken Seiyūkai	
Okayama-2nd	Setsuo Kotani	Rikken Seiyūkai	
Hiroshima-1st	Masaki Kishida	Shōwakai	
Hiroshima-1st	Kisanda Furuta	Rikken Minseitō	
Hiroshima-1st	Kan'ichi Nagawa	Rikken Seiyūkai	
Hiroshima-1st	Wakami Fujita	Rikken Minseitō	
Hiroshima-2nd	Shichirō Kihara	Rikken Minseitō	
Hiroshima-2nd	Keisuke Mochizuki	Shōwakai	
Hiroshima-2nd	Jōichi Yamaji	Rikken Minseitō	
Hiroshima-2nd	Takuji Hida	Rikken Seiyūkai	
Hiroshima-3rd	Tadanori Nagayama	Shōwakai	
Hiroshima-3rd	Yutaka Tsuchiya	Rikken Minseitō	
Hiroshima-3rd	Takatarō Sakuta	Rikken Minseitō	
Hiroshima-3rd	Yutaka Miyazawa	Rikken Seiyūkai	
Hiroshima-3rd	Fukuichi Morita	Rikken Seiyūkai	
Yamaguchi-1st	Sadaichi Nishikawa	Rikken Seiyūkai	
Yamaguchi-1st	Sakuo Aoki	Tōhōkai	
Yamaguchi-1st	Shintarō Shō	Rikken Seiyūkai	
Yamaguchi-1st	Kan Abe	Independent	
Yamaguchi-2nd	Shigeo Nishimura	Rikken Seiyūkai	
Yamaguchi-2nd	Yoshimichi Kuboi	Shōwakai	
Yamaguchi-2nd	Gorō Kunimitsu	Rikken Seiyūkai	
Yamaguchi-2nd	Yasuo Fukuda	Rikken Minseitō	
Yamaguchi-2nd	Jisuke Nakano	Rikken Seiyūkai	
Tokushima-1st	Wahei Ikuta	Rikken Seiyūkai	
Tokushima-1st	Hidekichi Tamura	Rikken Minseitō	
Tokushima-1st	Akira Kōro	Rikken Seiyūkai	
Tokushima-2nd	Katsu Manabe	Rikken Minseitō	
Tokushima-2nd	Kiyoshi Akita	Independent	
Tokushima-2nd	Takeo Miki	Independent	
Kagawa-1st	Shōichi Maekawa	Shakai Taishūtō	
Kagawa-1st	Sutesuke Fujimoto	Independent	
Kagawa-1st	Chōkichi Miyawaki	Rikken Seiyūkai	
Kagawa-2nd	Chūzō Mitsuchi	Rikken Seiyūkai	
Kagawa-2nd	Shōtarō Yano	Rikken Minseitō	
Kagawa-2nd	Ihei Matsuura	Rikken Seiyūkai	
Ehime-1st	Yūki Takechi	Rikken Minseitō	
Ehime-1st	Kisaburō Matsuda	Rikken Minseitō	
Ehime-1st	Sadatarō Ōmoto	Rikken Seiyūkai	
Ehime-2nd	Tetsuta Kawakami	Rikken Seiyūkai	
Ehime-2nd	Torakichi Ono	Rikken Minseitō	
Ehime-2nd	Takeo Murase	Rikken Minseitō	
Ehime-3rd	Shigemasa Sunada	Rikken Seiyūkai	
Ehime-3rd	Kametarō Takabatake	Rikken Seiyūkai	
Ehime-3rd	Monshirō Murakami	Rikken Minseitō	
Kōchi-1st	Masaru Ōishi	Tōhōkai	
Kōchi-1st	Kōjirō Tomita	Rikken Minseitō	
Kōchi-1st	Nagahiro Nagano	Rikken Minseitō	
Kōchi-2nd	Haruki Satake	Shakai Taishūtō	
Kōchi-2nd	Yoshiaki Yorimitsu	Rikken Seiyūkai	
Kōchi-2nd	Jōji Hayashi	Rikken Seiyūkai	
Fukuoka-1st	Seigō Nakano	Tōhōkai	
Fukuoka-1st	Jiichirō Matsumoto	Shakai Taishūtō	
Fukuoka-1st	Tsuneo Kangyū	Independent	
Fukuoka-1st	Hatsutarō Haraguchi	Rikken Seiyūkai	
Fukuoka-2nd	Kan'ichirō Kamei	Shakai Taishūtō	
Fukuoka-2nd	Seigo Tajiri	Rikken Seiyūkai	
Fukuoka-2nd	Tokuji Ishii	Rikken Seiyūkai	
Fukuoka-2nd	Katsutarō Tajima	Rikken Minseitō	
Fukuoka-2nd	Sanzō Matsuo	Rikken Minseitō	
Fukuoka-3rd	Shunsaku Noda	Rikken Seiyūkai	
Fukuoka-3rd	Tatsunosuke Yamazaki	Independent	
Fukuoka-3rd	Sōichi Tsuru	Rikken Seiyūkai	
Fukuoka-3rd	Gen'ya Masunaga	Rikken Seiyūkai	
Fukuoka-3rd	Ryūichi Okano	Rikken Minseitō	
Fukuoka-4th	Masanori Katsu	Rikken Minseitō	
Fukuoka-4th	Kaiichirō Suematsu	Rikken Minseitō	
Fukuoka-4th	Haruji Tahara	Shakai Taishūtō	
Fukuoka-4th	Shirō Koike	Political Renovation Conference	
Saga-1st	Hideo Ikeda	Rikken Minseitō	
Saga-1st	Hōichi Nakano	Rikken Minseitō	
Saga-1st	Ryōichi Tanaka	Rikken Seiyūkai	
Saga-2nd	Yasutarō Fujio	Rikken Seiyūkai	
Saga-2nd	Toshitami Ichinose	Rikken Seiyūkai	
Saga-2nd	Tokiichirō Aino	Rikken Minseitō	
Nagasaki-1st	Motoharu Baba	Tōhōkai	
Nagasaki-1st	Takejirō Nishioka	Rikken Seiyūkai	
Nagasaki-1st	Shōhachirō Kuranari	Rikken Seiyūkai	
Nagasaki-1st	Fujio Nakamura	Rikken Minseitō	
Nagasaki-1st	Riichi Ōta	Rikken Seiyūkai	
Nagasaki-2nd	Kōzō Makiyama	Rikken Minseitō	
Nagasaki-2nd	Hajime Mori	Shōwakai	
Nagasaki-2nd	Takashi Kawasoe	Rikken Minseitō	
Nagasaki-2nd	Hitsuo Saho	Rikken Seiyūkai	
Kumamoto-1st	Kenzō Adachi	Kokumin Dōmei	
Kumamoto-1st	Tsuruhei Matsuno	Rikken Seiyūkai	
Kumamoto-1st	Masayoshi Kimura	Rikken Seiyūkai	
Kumamoto-1st	Shigeru Ishizaka	Kokumin Dōmei	
Kumamoto-1st	Tadao Ōasa	Rikken Minseitō	
Kumamoto-2nd	Tomito Izu	Kokumin Dōmei	
Kumamoto-2nd	Nobufusa Miyoshi	Rikken Seiyūkai	
Kumamoto-2nd	Michio Sakata	Rikken Seiyūkai	
Kumamoto-2nd	Nasogorō Komiyama	Rikken Seiyūkai	
Kumamoto-2nd	Toshikatsu Kurahara	Kokumin Dōmei	
Ōita-1st	Tsuneo Kanemitsu	Rikken Seiyūkai	
Ōita-1st	Fusajirō Ichinomiya	Rikken Minseitō	
Ōita-1st	Tsunayoshi Nagano	Rikken Minseitō	
Ōita-1st	Sunao Ono	Rikken Seiyūkai	
Ōita-2nd	Jūji Shigematsu	Rikken Minseitō	
Ōita-2nd	Kikuo Kiyose	Rikken Seiyūkai	
Ōita-2nd	Kentarō Ayabe	Rikken Seiyūkai	
Miyazaki	Iwao Itō	Rikken Seiyūkai	
Miyazaki	Torao Miura	Tōhōkai	
Miyazaki	Shigetaka Sogi	Independent	
Miyazaki	Kentarō Suzuki	Rikken Minseitō	
Miyazaki	Gunkichi Jin	Shōwakai	
Kagoshima-1st	Tomoharu Inoue	Rikken Seiyūkai	
Kagoshima-1st	Jun'ya Koizumi	Rikken Minseitō	
Kagoshima-1st	Kōjirō Matsukata	Independent	
Kagoshima-1st	Naotake Tsuzaki	Independent	
Kagoshima-1st	Sanshirō Kurasono	Shōwakai	
Kagoshima-2nd	Eiji Tomiyoshi	Shakai Taishūtō	
Kagoshima-2nd	Minoru Tōgō	Rikken Seiyūkai	
Kagoshima-2nd	Ichimasa Terada	Rikken Seiyūkai	
Kagoshima-2nd	Eijirō Iwamoto	Rikken Seiyūkai	
Kagoshima-3rd	Ryōkichi Nagata	Rikken Seiyūkai	
Kagoshima-3rd	Masao Kanai	Shōwakai	
Kagoshima-3rd	Saburō Kobayashi	Rikken Minseitō	
Okinawa	Kenwa Kanna	Rikken Minseitō	
Okinawa	Hajime Irei	Kokumin Dōmei	
Okinawa	Sōichi Nakaima	Rikken Minseitō	
Okinawa	Shichō Sakiyama	Rikken Seiyūkai	
Okinawa	Meichō Morishima	Rikken Seiyūkai	

== Modifications ==
=== 1937 ===
- May 9 - Den Sugawara (Rikken Seiyūkai, Miyagi-1st) died.
- May 16 - Torakichi Ishiyama (Shakai Taishūtō, Tochigi-1st) died.
- May 24 - Seisaku Miyazawa (Rikken Seiyūkai) won by-election for Miyagi-1st constituency.
- May 21 - Shōwakai dissolved.
- May 30 - The Diet received the report of the dissolution of Shōwakai.
- June 5 - Tokuya Tsuboyama (Rikken Seiyūkai) won by-election for Tochigi-1st constituency.
- June 30 - Following members formed parliamentary group Second Waiting Room (第二控室):
  - Seiichirō Dōke (Independent, Tokyo-1st)
  - Daikichirō Tagawa (Independent, Tokyo-3rd)
  - Kanjū Katō (Japan Proletarian Party, Tokyo-5th)
  - Shinzō Imai (Meirinkai, Yamanashi)
  - Makoto Oyama (Independent, Nagano-2nd)
  - Kinji Nakahara (Shinano Veterans Brotherhood, Nagano-3rd)
  - Kō Tanaka (Rikken Yōseikai, Nagano-4th)
  - Benkyō Shiio (Independent, Aichi-1st)
  - Yukio Ozaki (Independent, Mie-2nd)
  - Tadayoshi Ikezaki (Independent, Osaka-3rd)
  - Toyokichi Tabuchi (Independent, Wakayama-2nd)
  - Kōjirō Matsukata (Independent, Kagoshima-1st)
  - Takeo Miki (Independent, Tokushima-2nd)
- July 10 - Following members, in addition to all members elected by Kokumin Dōmei, Shōwakai and Political Renovation Conference (except Kinji Nakahara), formed parliamentary group New Parliamentary Group Preparatory Society (新交渉団体準備会):
  - Sōtarō Sakamoto (Independent, Saitama-2nd)
  - Park Chun-geum (Independent, Tokyo-4th)
  - Chōji Hase (Independent, Ishikawa-1st)
  - Jūji Kasai (Independent, Yamanashi)
  - Rikizō Hirano (Kōdōkai, Yamanashi)
  - Kōzō Andō (Independent, Aichi-2nd)
  - Kan Abe (Independent, Yamaguchi-1st)
  - Kiyoshi Akita (Independent, Tokushima-2nd)
  - Sutesuke Fujimoto (Independent, Kagawa-1st)
  - Tsuneo Kangyū (Independent, Fukuoka-1st)
  - Tatsunosuke Yamazaki (Independent, Fukuoka-3rd)
  - Shigetaka Sogi (Independent, Miyazaki)
  - Naotake Tsuzaki (Independent, Kagoshima-1st)
- July 21 - New Parliamentary Group Preparatory Society changed its name to First Dietmen Club (第一議員倶楽部). Katsutarō Kita (Independent, Hokkaido-4th) joined First Dietmen Club.
- July 23 - Munenori Akagi (Independent, Ibaraki-3rd) joined First Dietmen Club.
- July 24 - Hajime Hoshi (Independent, Fukushima-3rd) joined Rikken Seiyūkai.
- September 3 - Speaker Shōju Koyama (Rikken Minseitō, Aichi-1st) and Deputy Speaker Tsuneo Kanemitsu (Rikken Seiyūkai, Ōita-1st) resigned from their parliamentary groups respectively.
- October 25 - Masao Taki (Independent, Aichi-3rd) was appointed President of the Cabinet Planning Board and resigned.
- November 10 - Morimasa Naitō (Rikken Minseitō) won by-election for Aichi-3rd constituency.
- December 11 - Haruo Okada (Rikken Minseitō, Hokkaido-4th) died.
- December 14 - Teijirō Yamamoto (Rikken Seiyūkai, Niigata-1st) died.
- December 20 - Tanjirō Nishimura (Rikken Minseitō, Okayama-2nd) died.
- December 22 - Japan Proletarian Party was banned amid the Popular Front Incident.
- December 24 - Hisao Kuroda (Shakai Taishūtō, Okayama-1st), caught up in the Popular Front Incident, resigned from his party.
- December 25 - Norishige Yamamasu (Rikken Minseitō, Tottori) died.
- December 30 - Takayuki Matsuo (Rikken Seiyūkai) won by-election for Hokkaido-4th constituency.

=== 1938 ===
- January 8 - Harutarō Iizuka (Rikken Minseitō, Gunma-1st) died.
- January 10 - Yoshiharu Yutani (Tōhōkai) won by-election for Tottori constituency.
- January 14 - Shikaji Shigei (Independent) won by-election for Okayama-2nd constituency. Being imprisoned due to the Popular Front Incident, he was not able to take his seat.
- January 16 - Sōkichi Hatta (Rikken Seiyūkai, Fukushima-2nd) died.
- January 17 - Masao Kanazawa (Rikken Seiyūkai) won by-election for Gunma-1st constituency.
- January 26 - Suematsu Minato (Rikken Minseitō) won by-election for Fukushima-2nd constituency.
- February 4 - Mojūrō Tange (Rikken Seiyūkai, Aichi-2nd) died.
- February 10 - Eimei Hattori (Rikken Minseitō) won by-election for Aichi-2nd constituency.
- February 14 - Kan'ichi Ōtake (First Dietmen Club, Niigata-3rd) was appointed as a member of the House of Peers and resigned. Munenori Akagi (First Dietmen Club, Ibaraki-3rd) was disqualified.
- February 16 - Kumekichi Yamamoto (Rikken Minseitō) was designated to fill the vacancy of Ibaraki-3rd constituency.
- February 18 - Kunitoshi Tsukumo (Tokyo-7th) and Toshima Nishikata (Yamagata-1st) resigned from Rikken Seiyūkai.
- February 21 - Tokuo Nanjō (Rikken Seiyūkai, Hokkaido-4th) was disqualified. Kōnen Fujii (Rikken Seiyūkai) won by-election for Niigata-3rd constituency.
- March 4 - Kichihei Fukasawa (Rikken Minseitō) won by-election for Hokkaido-4th constituency.
- March 7 - Zen'emon Kanno (Rikken Seiyūkai, Fukushima-1st) was disqualified.
- March 10 - Zenbee Horikiri (Rikken Seiyūkai) was designated to fill the vacancy of Fukushima-1st constituency.
- March 23 - Kōjirō Tomita (Rikken Minseitō, Kōchi-1st) died. Suehiro Nishio (Shakai Taishūtō, Osaka-4th) was disqualified.
- March 25 - Shigei Asai and Masayoshi Morita (both Rikken Seiyūkai) won by-election for Kōchi-1st and Osaka-4th constituencies respectively.
- April 7 - Meichō Morishima (Rikken Seiyūkai, Okinawa) was disqualified.
- April 16 - Sakae Oda (Shakai Taishūtō) won by-election for Okinawa constituency.
- April 22 - Shōhachirō Kuranari (Rikken Seiyūkai, Nagasaki-1st) died.
- May 10 - Utarō Norimoto (Rikken Minseitō) won by-election for Nagasaki-1st constituency.
- June 24 - Seisaku Miyazawa (Rikken Seiyūkai, Miyagi-1st) was disqualified.
- June 27 - Roichi Hayashi (First Dietmen Club, Hokkaido-2nd) died.
- July 14 - Seisaku Miyazawa (Rikken Seiyūkai) was reelected to Miyagi-1st constituency following disqualification.
- August 4 - Naoji Kawai (Rikken Minseitō, Niigata-4th) died.
- August 23 - Shikaji Shigei (Independent, Okayama-2nd) resigned.
- September 3 - Suematsu Minato (Rikken Minseitō, Fukushima-2nd) died.
- October 21 - Tei Tōjō (Rikken Seiyūkai, Hokkaido-5th) was disqualified.
- October 23 - Kōnen Fujii (Rikken Seiyūkai, Niigata-3rd) died.
- November 12 - Tei Tōjō (Rikken Seiyūkai) was reelected to Hokkaido-5th constituency following disqualification.
- December 23 - Toshima Nishikata (Yamagata-1st) rejoined Rikken Seiyūkai.

=== 1939 ===
- January 7 - Kumeshirō Katō (Rikken Seiyūkai, Mie-1st) died.
- January 28 - Katsutarō Tajima (Rikken Minseitō, Fukuoka-2nd) died.
- January 26 - Sakae Oda (Okinawa) resigned from Shakai Taishūtō.
- February 4 - Sakae Oda (Independent, Okinawa) joined Second Waiting Room. Kanjū Katō (Tokyo-5th) resigned from Second Waiting Room.
- February 10 - Torao Miura (Miyazaki) and Motoharu Baba (Nagasaki-1st) resigned from Tōhōkai.
- March 14 - Seisaku Miyazawa (Rikken Seiyūkai, Miyagi-1st) died.
- March 17 - Fusakichi Tōyama (Rikken Minseitō, Hokkaido-5th) died.
- March 21 - Masayoshi Morita (Rikken Seiyūkai, Osaka-4th) died.
- March 24 - Fumie Kitamura (Rikken Minseitō) won by-election for Miyagi-1st constituency.
- March 28 - Eizō Mori (Rikken Seiyūkai, Nara) was disqualified.
- April 4 - Tōhōkai dissolved its parliamentary caucus.
- April 6 - Sanshirō Kurasono (First Dietmen Club, Kagoshima-1st) died.
- April 7 - Fujio Nakamura (Rikken Minseitō, Nagasaki-1st) was disqualified.
- April 10 - Naomichi Inada (Rikken Seiyūkai, Tottori) was disqualified.
- April 11 - Seigō Nakano (Independent, Fukuoka-1st) resigned.
- April 14 - Nakajirō Ichiyanagi (Rikken Minseitō, Hokkaido-1st) died.
- April 18 - Gonzō Terashima (Rikken Minseitō, Toyama-1st) was disqualified.
- April 20 - Keitarō Kitaura (Independent) won by-election for Nara constituency.
- April 30 - The Reformist Faction of Rikken Seiyūkai elected Chikuhei Nakajima as party president. Eisaku Honda (Rikken Seiyūkai) won by-election for Nagasaki-1st constituency.
- May 3 - Tsunekichi Yamazaki (First Dietmen Club, Aichi-1st) was disqualified.
- May 4 - Naomichi Inada (Rikken Seiyūkai) was reelected to Tottori constituency following disqualification.
- May 6 - Shūtarō Matsuura (Rikken Minseitō, Hokkaido-2nd) was disqualified.
- May 10 - Toyokazu Ishisaka (Rikken Seiyūkai) won by-election for Toyama-1st constituency.
- May 17 - Nakano Torakichi (First Dietmen Club, Fukushima-2nd) joined Rikken Seiyūkai.
- May 20 - The Orthodox Faction of Rikken Seiyūkai elected Fusanosuke Kuhara as party president. Yasutarō Kawamura (Shakai Taishūtō, Osaka-4th) was disqualified.
- May 22 - Tomoyoshi Tamano (First Dietmen Club, Okayama-1st) joined Rikken Seiyūkai.
- May 24 - Ryōgorō Katō (Rikken Seiyūkai) won by-election for Aichi-1st constituency.
- May 30 - Shūtarō Matsuura (Rikken Minseitō) was reelected to Hokkaido-2nd constituency following disqualification. Motokichi Murakami (Rikken Seiyūkai) won by-election for Hokkaido-2nd constituency.
- June 13 - Suehiro Nishio (Shakai Taishūtō) was reelected to Osaka-4th constituency following disqualification. Kichirōbee Yoshikawa (Rikken Minseitō)won by-election for Osaka-4th constituency.
- June 15 - Following members of First Dietmen Club joined Rikken Seiyūkai:
  - Toyomitsu Isaka (Osaka-6th)
  - Hajime Mori (Nagasaki-2nd)
  - Seishō Haruna (Shizuoka-2nd)
  - Osamu Toyoda (Tottori)
  - Masaki Kishida (Hiroshima-1st)
  - Yoshimichi Kuboi (Yamaguchi-2nd)
  - Tatsunosuke Yamazaki (Fukuoka-3rd)
  - Gunkichi Jin (Miyazaki)
- June 22 - Keisuke Mochizuki (First Dietmen Club, Hiroshima-2nd) joined Rikken Seiyūkai.
- July 1 - Following members of First Dietmen Club joined Rikken Seiyūkai:
  - Tsuneo Kangyū (Fukuoka-1st)
  - Masao Kanai (Kagoshima-3rd)
- August 4 - Gensaburō Tanaka (Rikken Seiyūkai, Hyōgo-3rd) was disqualified.
- August 27 - Ken'ichi Yoshida (Independent) won by-election for Hyōgo-3rd constituency.
- September 3 - Takeshi Azuma (Rikken Seiyūkai, Hokkaido-2nd) died.
- September 6 - Kunimatsu Hamada (Rikken Seiyūkai, Mie-2nd) died.
- September 7 - Kunitoshi Tsukumo (Independent, Tokyo-7th) joined Rikken Seiyūkai.
- September 14 - Shintarō Shō (Rikken Seiyūkai, Yamaguchi-1st) died.
- September 18 - Shūichirō Kimoto (Rikken Seiyūkai, Wakayama-1st) died.
- October 14 - Teikichi Shiba (Rikken Minseitō, Tokyo-5th) died.
- October 18 - Keitarō Kitaura (Independent, Nara) joined First Dietmen Club as a member of Japan Renovation Party.
- October 21 - Kentarō Suzuki (Rikken Minseitō, Miyazaki) was disqualified.
- November 18 - Kentarō Suzuki (Rikken Minseitō) was reelected to Miyazaki constituency following disqualification.
- November 25 - Following Independent members joined First Dietmen Club:
  - Motoharu Baba (Nagasaki-1st)
  - Torao Miura (Miyazaki)
- November 27 - Seiichi Aoki (First Dietmen Club, Gunma-1st) joined Rikken Seiyūkai. Following members, in addition to all members from Kokumin Dōmei and Japan Renovation Party, formed parliamentary group Current Situation Brotherhood (時局同志会):
- From Second Waiting Room:
  - Makoto Oyama (Nagano-2nd)
  - Kinji Nakahara (Nagano-3rd)
  - Tadayoshi Ikezaki (Osaka-3rd)
  - Seiichirō Dōke (Tokyo-1st)
  - Takeo Miki (Tokushima-2nd)
  - Benkyō Shiio (Aichi-1st)
  - Kōjirō Matsukata (Kagoshima-1st)
  - Shinzō Imai (Yamanashi)
- From Independents:
  - Takeo Mitamura (Gifu-2nd)
  - Sakuo Aoki (Yamaguchi-1st)
  - Ken'ichi Ono (Aomori-2nd)
  - Yōtatsu Tanaka (Shiga)
  - Yoshiharu Yutani (Tottori)
  - Masaru Ōishi (Kōchi-1st)
  - Ken'ichi Yoshida (Hyōgo-3rd)
  - Takeo Kimura (Yamagata-1st)
  - Takeo Sugiura (Aichi-5th)
- December 4 - Park Chun-geum (First Dietmen Club, Tokyo-4th) joined Current Situation Brotherhood.
- December 8 - Naozaburō Era (Rikken Seiyūkai, Kyoto-1st) died.
- December 20 - Second Waiting Room dissolved. Shingorō Hanashi (Rikken Seiyūkai, Ibaraki-1st) was disqualified.
- December 23 - Tsuneo Kanemitsu (Independent) rejoined Rikken Seiyūkai. Sakae Oda, Daikichirō Tagawa and Yukio Ozaki (all Independent) joined First Dietmen Club.
- Parliamentary Caucus of Rikken Seiyūkai split into Reformist, Orthodox and Neutralist factions, all continuing to use Rikken Seiyūkai as the name of their caucuses.
- After the formation of three caucuses, Junsuke Itaya (Neutralist, Hokkaido-1st) migrated to the Orthodox caucus, while Shōzō Matsukawa (Orthodox, Iwate-2nd) migrated to the Neutralist caucus.
- December 26 - Kō Tanaka (Independent, Nagano-4th) joined First Dietmen Club.
- December 27 - Deputy Speaker Ichimin Tago (Reformist Seiyūkai, Iwate-1st) resigned from his parliamentary group.

=== 1940 ===
- January 9 - Setsuo Kotani (Neutralist Seiyūkai, Okayama-2nd) joined Orthodox Seiyūkai.
- January 12 - Ken Watanabe (Rikken Minseitō) won by-election for Ibaraki-1st constituency.
- January 17 - Saburō Kobayashi (Rikken Minseitō, Kagoshima-3rd) was disqualified.
- February 2 - Shōzō Matsukawa (Neutralist Seiyūkai, Iwate-2nd) joined Reformist Seiyūkai.
- February 3 - Takao Saitō (Hyōgo-5th) resigned from Rikken Minseitō.
- February 5 - Keitarō Kitaura (Current Situation Brotherhood, Nara) joined First Dietmen Club.
- February 10 - Kamejirō Yamamoto (Independent) won by-election for Kagoshima-3rd constituency.
- February 12 - Seigo Tajiri (Fukuoka-2nd) resigned from Reformist Seiyūkai.
- February 19 - Keikichi Tanomogi (Rikken Minseitō, Tokyo-3rd) died.
- February 21 - Kamejirō Yamamoto (Independent, Kagoshima-3rd) joined First Dietmen Club.
- March 4 - Kumetarō Takagi (Rikken Minseitō, Shizuoka-2nd) died.
- March 6 - Park Chun-geum (Current Situation Brotherhood, Tokyo-4th) joined First Dietmen Club.
- March 7 - Kyūjirō Okazaki (Kanagawa-3rd) resigned from Rikken Minseitō. Takao Saitō (Independent, Hyōgo-5th) was expelled.
- March 22 - Following members resigned from Shakai Taishūtō:
  - Isoo Abe (Tokyo-2nd)
  - Bunji Suzuki (Tokyo-6th)
  - Ken Okazaki (Kanagawa-1st)
  - Tetsu Katayama (Kanagawa-2nd)
  - Jiichirō Matsumoto (Fukuoka-1st)
  - Suehiro Nishio (Osaka-4th)
  - Mitsusuke Yonekubo (Hyōgo-2nd)
  - Chōsaburō Mizutani (Kyoto-1st)
  - Eiji Tomiyoshi (Kagoshima-2nd)
  - Yoshio Matsunaga (Saitama-1st)
- March 25 - Yoichi Satō (Rikken Minseitō, Niigata-2nd) died. Following members of Orthodox Seiyūkai formed parliamentary group New Neutralist Rikken Seiyūkai (立憲政友会新中立派):
  - Tomoyoshi Tamano (Okayama-1st)
  - Torakichi Nakano (Fukushima-2nd)
  - Takejirō Nishioka (Nagasaki-1st)
  - Takuji Hida (Hiroshima-2nd)
  - Eisaku Honda (Nagasaki-1st)
- March 27 - Following members formed parliamentary group Seventh Day Association (七日会):
- From Current Situation Brotherhood:
  - Sakuo Aoki (Yamaguchi-1st)
  - Genkurō Etō (Nara)
  - Ken'ichi Ono (Aomori-2nd)
  - Benkyō Shiio (Aichi-1st)
  - Seiichirō Dōke (Tokyo-1st)
  - Miki Takeo (Tokushima-2nd)
  - Ken'ichi Yoshida (Hyōgo-3rd)
- From Independents:
  - Yasukuni Watanabe (Hokkaido-3rd)
- March 29 - Yasukuni Watanabe resigned from Seventh Day Association.
- March 30 - Current Situation Association dissolved.
- April 15 - Kokumin Dōmei refounded its parliamentary caucus with its 10 representatives.
- May 3 - New Neutralist Rikken Seiyūkai merged into Neutralist Seiyūkai.
- May 4 - Takichi Hashimot (Orthodox Seiyūkai, Ishikawa-1st) joined Neutralist Seiyūkai.
- May 13 - Neutralist Seiyūkai renamed itself to Unionist (統一派) Seiyūkai.
- May 14 - All 10 representatives who left Shakai Taishūtō on March 22 formed parliamentary group Tenth Day Association (十日会).
- July 2 - Tenth Day Association dissolved.
- July 7 - Shakai Taishūtō dissolved.
- July 16 - Orthodox Seiyūkai and Unionist Seiyūkai dissolved.
- July 24 - Chūzō Mitsuchi (former Orthodox Seiyūkai, Kagawa-2nd) was appointed to the Privy Council and resigned.
- July 26 - Kokumin Dōmei dissolved.
- July 30 - Reformist Seiyūkai dissolved. 38 representatives resigned from Rikken Minseitō.
- August 12 - First Dietmen Club dissolved.
- August 15 - Rikken Minseitō dissolved.
- August 16 - Seventh Day Association dissolved.
- September 6 - Hisashi Asō (former Shakai Taishūtō, Tokyo-5th) died.
- September 9 - Hitsuo Saho (former Orthodox Seiyūkai, Nagasaki-2nd) died.
- September 26 - Zenbee Horikiri (former Reformist Seiyūkai, Fukushima-1st) resigned.
- October 21 - Kōzen Hirokawa and Seitarō Ōhashi, both Independent, won by-election for Tokyo-5th constituency.
- November 14 - Seigo Tajiri (former Reformist Seiyūkai, Fukuoka-2nd) resigned.
- December 20 - House of Representatives Dietmen Club (衆議院議員倶楽部; HRDC), parliamentary wing of Imperial Rule Assistance Association, was formed with 435 representatives.
- December 27 - Yukio Ozaki (Independent, Mie-2nd) joined HRDC.

=== 1941 ===
- January 1 - Keisuke Mochizuki (HRDC, Hiroshima-2nd) died.
- January 21 - Sadao Wakamiya (Independent, Hyōgo-5th) joined HRDC. Isoo Abe (HRDC, Tokyo-2nd) resigned.
- April 2 - Tokutarō Shimizu (HRDC, Yamagata-2nd) was disqualified.
- April 21 - Hiraku Satō (HRDC, Yamagata-1st) died.
- May 11 - Jōichi Yamaji (HRDC, Hiroshima-2nd) died.
- July 24 - Kamejirō Yamamoto (HRDC, Kagoshima-3rd) was disqualified.
- August 4 - Ryōkan Aoki (HRDC, Shiga) died.
- August 8 - Sōmei Tsuchikura (HRDC, Toyama-2nd) was disqualified.
- September 2 - HRDC dissolved and 326 of its former members formed Imperial Rule Assistance Dietmen Union (翼賛議員同盟; 翼同, IRADU).
- September 15 - 12 representatives joined IRADU.
- September 24 - Takeru Inukai (Okayama-2nd) joined IRADU.
- October 27 - Chōji Hase (Ishikawa-1st) joined IRADU.
- October 29 - Tomoyuki Kuyama (Okayama-1st) and Yōichi Kuramoto (Shizuoka-2nd) left IRADU.
- October 31 - Akira Kōro (Tokushima-1st) left IRADU.
- November 4 - Yoshimichi Kuboi (Yamaguchi-2nd) left IRADU.
- November 8 - Motokichi Murakami (IRADU, Hokkaido-2nd) died.
- November 10 - Takayuki Matsuo (Hokkaido-4th) left IRADU. 35 representatives formed Kindred Spirits Association (同交会; KSA).
- November 12–26 representatives formed Asia Development Dietmen Union (興亜議員同盟; ADDU). 8 representatives formed Coterie Club (同人倶楽部; CC).
- November 14 - 11 representatives formed Dietmen Club (議員倶楽部; DC). Yukio Ozaki (Mie-2nd) and Ichirō Hatoyama (Tokyo-2nd) joined KSA.
- November 19 - 19 representatives left IRADU. Taneo Miyazawa (IRADU, Nagano-3rd) resigned. Tomoyoshi Tamano (Okayama-1st) joined DC.
- November 20 - Tadayoshi Ikezaki (Osaka-3rd) joined DC. Masao Kanai (Kagoshima-3rd) left IRADU.
- November 23 - Shōhei Hisa (IRADU, Fukushima-3rd) died.
- December 18 - Tamashige Hara (IRADU, Tokyo-1st) joined DC.
- December 24 - Kō Tanaka (Independent, Nagano-4th) joined ADDU.
- December 26 - All 8 members of CC, along with 28 Independent representatives, formed First Waiting Room (第一控室; FWR).

=== 1942 ===
- January 21 - Ryūichi Okano (IRADU, Fukuoka-3rd) joined DC.
- January 29 - Shigemasa Sunada (IRADU, Ehime-3rd) resigned.
- March 20 - Kyūjirō Okazaki (KSA, Kanagawa-3rd) died.
- March 25 - FWR dissolved.
- March 28 - Sadayoshi Hitotsumatsu (Osaka-1st) left KSA. Seiichirō Dōke (IRADU, Tokyo-1st) died.
- April 30 - New general election.

== Parliamentary composition ==
=== 71st Imperial Diet ===
Composition of the House of Representatives of Japan (as of July 25, 1937, first day of the 71st Imperial Diet) (elected in 1937; term: 30 April 1937 – 25 March 1942)
Parliamentary groups/caucuses	Parties	Seats
Rikken Minseitō	Rikken Minseitō	180
Rikken Seiyūkai	Rikken Seiyūkai	175
First Dietmen Club; Daiichi Giin Club	Kokumin Dōmei (11); Japan Renovation Party (4); Kōdōkai (1); Independents (33)	49
Shakai Taishūtō	Shakai Taishūtō	36
Second Waiting Room; Daini Hikaeshitsu	Japan Proletarian Party (1); Shinano Veterans Brotherhood (1); Rikken Yōseikai (1); Meirinkai (1); Independents (9)	13
Tōhōkai	Tōhōkai	11
Independents (not member of a caucus); Mushozoku	Independents (not member of a party)	2
Total		466

Detailed composition
Constituency	Members	Parliamentary Group	Notes
Hokkaido-1st	Kōzō Yamamoto	Rikken Minseitō	
Hokkaido-1st	Junsuke Itaya	Rikken Seiyūkai	
Hokkaido-1st	Rikichi Sawada	Rikken Minseitō	
Hokkaido-1st	Nakajirō Ichiyanagi	Rikken Minseitō	
Hokkaido-2nd	Takeshi Azuma	Rikken Seiyūkai	
Hokkaido-2nd	Roichi Hayashi	First Dietmen Club	
Hokkaido-2nd	Kōtarō Bandō	Rikken Minseitō	
Hokkaido-2nd	Shūtarō Matsuura	Rikken Minseitō	
Hokkaido-3rd	Torakichi Ōshima	Rikken Minseitō	
Hokkaido-3rd	Yasukuni Watanabe	Tōhōkai	
Hokkaido-3rd	Shōji Tashiro	Rikken Seiyūkai	
Hokkaido-4th	Katsumaro Akamatsu	First Dietmen Club	
Hokkaido-4th	Ryūkichi Teshirogi	Rikken Minseitō	
Hokkaido-4th	Katsutarō Kita	First Dietmen Club	
Hokkaido-4th	Haruo Okada	Rikken Minseitō	
Hokkaido-4th	Tokuo Nanjō	Rikken Seiyūkai	
Hokkaido-5th	Fusakichi Tōyama	Rikken Minseitō	
Hokkaido-5th	Shigetarō Kinoshita	Rikken Seiyūkai	
Hokkaido-5th	Tei Tōjō	Rikken Seiyūkai	
Hokkaido-5th	Seisaku Nagumo	Rikken Minseitō	
Aomori-1st	Yasomi Ogasawara	Rikken Seiyūkai	
Aomori-1st	Tetsuo Kudō	Rikken Minseitō	
Aomori-1st	Jūjirō Morita	Rikken Minseitō	
Aomori-2nd	Ken'ichi Ono	Tōhōkai	
Aomori-2nd	Tosao Kudō	Rikken Seiyūkai	
Aomori-2nd	Ryūichi Kikuchi	Rikken Minseitō	
Iwate-1st	Ichimin Tago	Rikken Seiyūkai	
Iwate-1st	Jutarō Takahashi	Rikken Minseitō	
Iwate-1st	Saburō Yasumi	Rikken Seiyūkai	
Iwate-2nd	Kunisaburō Izumi	Rikken Seiyūkai	
Iwate-2nd	Shōzō Matsukawa	Rikken Seiyūkai	
Iwate-2nd	Yūsuke Tsurumi	Rikken Minseitō	
Iwate-2nd	Watari Shiga	Rikken Seiyūkai	
Miyagi-1st	Sakusaburō Uchigasaki	Rikken Minseitō	
Miyagi-1st	Yōnosuke Kikuchi	Shakai Taishūtō	
Miyagi-1st	Ichirō Shōji	Rikken Seiyūkai	
Miyagi-1st	Eifu Moriya	First Dietmen Club	
Miyagi-1st	Seisaku Miyazawa	Rikken Seiyūkai	
Miyagi-2nd	Hisayoshi Muramatsu	Rikken Minseitō	
Miyagi-2nd	Kuranosuke Oyama	Rikken Minseitō	
Miyagi-2nd	Rinji Ōishi	Rikken Seiyūkai	
Akita-1st	Chūji Machida	Rikken Minseitō	
Akita-1st	Giemon Shida	Rikken Minseitō	
Akita-1st	Gichoku Nakata	Rikken Seiyūkai	
Akita-1st	Shigeharu Nakagawa	Rikken Minseitō	
Akita-2nd	Seion Kawamata	Shakai Taishūtō	
Akita-2nd	Yoshitaka Oyamada	Rikken Seiyūkai	
Akita-2nd	Sōsuke Tsuchida	Rikken Minseitō	
Yamagata-1st	Takeo Kimura	Tōhōkai	
Yamagata-1st	Kumajirō Takahashi	Rikken Seiyūkai	
Yamagata-1st	Toshima Nishikata	Rikken Seiyūkai	
Yamagata-1st	Hiraku Satō	First Dietmen Club	
Yamagata-2nd	Toshizō Matsuoka	Rikken Seiyūkai	
Yamagata-2nd	Naota Kumagai	Rikken Seiyūkai	
Yamagata-2nd	Gorō Itō	Rikken Minseitō	
Yamagata-2nd	Tokutarō Shizumi	Rikken Minseitō	
Fukushima-1st	Hiroshi Momiyama	Rikken Minseitō	
Fukushima-1st	Morio Kugimoto	Rikken Minseitō	
Fukushima-1st	Zen'emon Kanno	Rikken Seiyūkai	
Fukushima-2nd	Sōkichi Hatta	Rikken Seiyūkai	
Fukushima-2nd	Saburō Nakanishi	Rikken Minseitō	
Fukushima-2nd	Keishirō Sukekawa	Rikken Seiyūkai	
Fukushima-2nd	Torakichi Nakano	First Dietmen Club	
Fukushima-2nd	Heima Hayashi	Rikken Minseitō	
Fukushima-3rd	Shōhei Hisa	Rikken Minseitō	
Fukushima-3rd	Hajime Hoshi	Rikken Seiyūkai	
Fukushima-3rd	Rokurō Yamada	Rikken Minseitō	
Ibaraki-1st	Nobuya Uchida	First Dietmen Club	
Ibaraki-1st	Toshihide Nakazaki	Rikken Minseitō	
Ibaraki-1st	Toyokichi Toyota	Rikken Minseitō	
Ibaraki-1st	Shingorō Hanashi	Rikken Seiyūkai	
Ibaraki-2nd	Hiroshi Nakaigawa	Rikken Minseitō	
Ibaraki-2nd	Minotarō Kawasaki	Rikken Seiyūkai	
Ibaraki-2nd	Takenosuke Ōuchi	Rikken Seiyūkai	
Ibaraki-3rd	Akira Kazami	Independent	
Ibaraki-3rd	Munenori Akagi	First Dietmen Club	
Ibaraki-3rd	Yōnosuke Satō	Rikken Seiyūkai	
Ibaraki-3rd	Gorō Iimura	First Dietmen Club	
Tochigi-1st	Naka Funada	Rikken Seiyūkai	
Tochigi-1st	Unpei Takada	Rikken Minseitō	
Tochigi-1st	Tokuya Tsuboyama	Rikken Seiyūkai	
Tochigi-1st	Saburō Ehara	Rikken Seiyūkai	
Tochigi-1st	Kikuji Okada	Rikken Minseitō	
Tochigi-2nd	Kunio Morishita	Rikken Minseitō	
Tochigi-2nd	Kōzō Matsumura	Rikken Seiyūkai	
Tochigi-2nd	Jūkichi Odaira	Rikken Seiyūkai	
Tochigi-2nd	Asashichi Kimura	Rikken Minseitō	
Gunma-1st	Chikuhei Nakajima	Rikken Seiyūkai	
Gunma-1st	Seiichi Aoki	First Dietmen Club	
Gunma-1st	Kō Sunaga	Shakai Taishūtō	
Gunma-1st	Harutarō Iizuka	Rikken Minseitō	
Gunma-1st	Tomesaburō Shizumi	Rikken Minseitō	
Gunma-2nd	Yoshimasa Shinohara	Rikken Seiyūkai	
Gunma-2nd	Masazō Mogami	Rikken Minseitō	
Gunma-2nd	Sanshirō Kogure	Rikken Seiyūkai	
Gunma-2nd	Budayū Kogure	Rikken Seiyūkai	
Saitama-1st	Tō Matsunaga	Rikken Minseitō	
Saitama-1st	Hajime Miyazaki	Rikken Seiyūkai	
Saitama-1st	Yasuo Takahashi	Rikken Seiyūkai	
Saitama-1st	Yoshio Matsunaga	Shakai Taishūtō	
Saitama-2nd	Morihei Takahashi	Rikken Minseitō	
Saitama-2nd	Jūji Yokokawa	Rikken Seiyūkai	
Saitama-2nd	Yōhei Ishizaka	Rikken Seiyūkai	
Saitama-2nd	Sōtarō Sakamoto	First Dietmen Club	
Saitama-3rd	Tetsuya Nonaka	First Dietmen Club	
Saitama-3rd	Hyōkichi Idei	Rikken Seiyūkai	
Saitama-3rd	Yoshihide Furushima	Rikken Minseitō	
Chiba-1st	Mitsunaga Tada	Rikken Minseitō	
Chiba-1st	Rokurō Shinohara	Rikken Minseitō	
Chiba-1st	Isamu Narushima	Rikken Minseitō	
Chiba-1st	Shōjirō Kawashima	Rikken Seiyūkai	
Chiba-2nd	Takehiko Imai	Rikken Seiyūkai	
Chiba-2nd	Shōryō Yoshiue	Rikken Seiyūkai	
Chiba-2nd	Shirō Uga	Rikken Minseitō	
Chiba-3rd	Akira Iwase	Rikken Seiyūkai	
Chiba-3rd	Chōsaburō Odaka	Rikken Seiyūkai	
Chiba-3rd	Seisaburō Tsuchiya	Rikken Minseitō	
Chiba-3rd	Seishū Ikeda	Rikken Minseitō	
Tokyo-1st	Mitsu Kōno	Shakai Taishūtō	
Tokyo-1st	Tamashige Hara	Rikken Minseitō	
Tokyo-1st	Yoshitsugu Takahashi	Rikken Minseitō	
Tokyo-1st	Seiichirō Dōke	Second Waiting Room	
Tokyo-1st	Yoshinari Honda	Rikken Seiyūkai	
Tokyo-2nd	Isoo Abe	Shakai Taishūtō	
Tokyo-2nd	Ichirō Hatoyama	Rikken Seiyūkai	
Tokyo-2nd	Yadanji Nakajima	Rikken Minseitō	
Tokyo-2nd	Jūji Komai	Rikken Minseitō	
Tokyo-2nd	Takaichi Nagano	Rikken Minseitō	
Tokyo-3rd	Keikichi Tanomogi	Rikken Minseitō	
Tokyo-3rd	Inejirō Asanuma	Shakai Taishūtō	
Tokyo-3rd	Daikichirō Tagawa	Second Waiting Room	
Tokyo-3rd	Masazumi Andō	Rikken Seiyūkai	
Tokyo-4th	Shigeo Abe	Shakai Taishūtō	
Tokyo-4th	Gijū Manabe	Rikken Minseitō	
Tokyo-4th	Shichirō Takizawa	Rikken Seiyūkai	
Tokyo-4th	Park Chun-geum	First Dietmen Club	
Tokyo-5th	Hisashi Asō	Shakai Taishūtō	
Tokyo-5th	Kanjū Katō	Second Waiting Room	
Tokyo-5th	Teikichi Shiba	Rikken Minseitō	
Tokyo-5th	Jusō Miwa	Shakai Taishūtō	
Tokyo-5th	Shizuo Makino	Rikken Seiyūkai	
Tokyo-6th	Bunji Suzuki	Shakai Taishūtō	
Tokyo-6th	Yonezō Maeda	Rikken Seiyūkai	
Tokyo-6th	Kiyoshi Yamada	Rikken Minseitō	
Tokyo-6th	Umekichi Nakamura	Rikken Minseitō	
Tokyo-6th	Gen Tanaka	Rikken Seiyūkai	
Tokyo-7th	Takeji Yatsunami	Rikken Minseitō	
Tokyo-7th	Takaichi Nakamura	Shakai Taishūtō	
Tokyo-7th	Kunitoshi Tsukumo	Rikken Seiyūkai	
Kanagawa-1st	Ken Okazaki	Shakai Taishūtō	
Kanagawa-1st	Sukeo Iida	Rikken Minseitō	
Kanagawa-1st	Jirō Nogata	Rikken Seiyūkai	
Kanagawa-2nd	Matajirō Koizumi	Rikken Minseitō	
Kanagawa-2nd	Tetsu Katayama	Shakai Taishūtō	
Kanagawa-2nd	Seiichi Ogushi	Rikken Seiyūkai	
Kanagawa-2nd	Kiichi Noguchi	Rikken Seiyūkai	
Kanagawa-3rd	Ichirō Kōno	Rikken Seiyūkai	
Kanagawa-3rd	Matsutarō Hirakawa	Rikken Minseitō	
Kanagawa-3rd	Hideo Suzuki	Rikken Seiyūkai	
Kanagawa-3rd	Kyūjirō Okazaki	Rikken Minseitō	
Niigata-1st	Reikichi Kita	Rikken Minseitō	
Niigata-1st	Teijirō Yamamoto	Rikken Seiyūkai	
Niigata-1st	Gunji Matsui	Rikken Minseitō	
Niigata-2nd	Daisuke Takaoka	First Dietmen Club	
Niigata-2nd	Yoichi Satō	Rikken Minseitō	
Niigata-2nd	Hiromu Matsuki	Rikken Seiyūkai	
Niigata-2nd	Makie Koyanagi	Rikken Minseitō	
Niigata-3rd	Shōichi Miyake	Shakai Taishūtō	
Niigata-3rd	Kan'ichi Ōtake	First Dietmen Club	
Niigata-3rd	Chisei Katō	Rikken Seiyūkai	
Niigata-3rd	Tomenosuke Imanari	Rikken Minseitō	
Niigata-3rd	Kennosuke Satō	Rikken Minseitō	
Niigata-4th	Tokusaburō Takeda	Rikken Seiyūkai	
Niigata-4th	Giichi Masuda	Rikken Minseitō	
Niigata-4th	Naoji Kawai	Rikken Minseitō	
Toyama-1st	Yukimichi Takami	Rikken Seiyūkai	
Toyama-1st	Gonzō Terashima	Rikken Minseitō	
Toyama-1st	Karoku Nomura	Rikken Minseitō	
Toyama-2nd	Kitarō Uota	Rikken Minseitō	
Toyama-2nd	Kenzō Matsumura	Rikken Minseitō	
Toyama-2nd	Sōmei Tsuchikura	Rikken Seiyūkai	
Ishikawa-1st	Ryūtarō Nagai	Rikken Minseitō	
Ishikawa-1st	Chōji Hase	First Dietmen Club	
Ishikawa-1st	Takichi Hashimoto	Rikken Seiyūkai	
Ishikawa-2nd	Hyōgorō Sakurai	Rikken Minseitō	
Ishikawa-2nd	Kenzō Aoyama	Rikken Seiyūkai	
Ishikawa-2nd	Sōichirō Kita	Rikken Minseitō	
Fukui	Toshie Inoke	Rikken Seiyūkai	
Fukui	Keiichirō Soeda	Rikken Minseitō	
Fukui	Hichirōbei Ikeda	Rikken Seiyūkai	
Fukui	Naokitsu Saitō	Rikken Minseitō	
Fukui	Gouemon Kumagai	First Dietmen Club	
Yamanashi	Shichiroku Tanabe	Rikken Seiyūkai	
Yamanashi	Rikizō Hirano	First Dietmen Club	
Yamanashi	Jūji Kasai	First Dietmen Club	
Yamanashi	Ryōhei Horiuchi	Rikken Minseitō	
Yamanashi	Shinzō Imai	Second Waiting Room	
Nagano-1st	Tadao Matsumoto	Rikken Minseitō	
Nagano-1st	Bensaburō Maruyama	Rikken Seiyūkai	
Nagano-1st	Kuniji Tanaka	Rikken Minseitō	
Nagano-2nd	Kunitarō Oyama	Rikken Minseitō	
Nagano-2nd	Makoto Oyama	Second Waiting Room	
Nagano-2nd	Bushirō Hata	Rikken Seiyūkai	
Nagano-3rd	Taneo Miyazawa	Rikken Minseitō	
Nagano-3rd	Achinosuke Kitahara	Rikken Minseitō	
Nagano-3rd	Kinji Nakahara	Second Waiting Room	
Nagano-3rd	Masaru Nomizo	Shakai Taishūtō	
Nagano-4th	Etsujirō Uehara	Rikken Seiyūkai	
Nagano-4th	Wataru Momose	Rikken Minseitō	
Nagano-4th	Kō Tanaka	Second Waiting Room	
Gifu-1st	Kan Kiyoshi	Rikken Minseitō	
Gifu-1st	Eikichi Hikita	Rikken Seiyūkai	
Gifu-1st	Banboku Ōno	Rikken Seiyūkai	
Gifu-2nd	Sakujirō Kimura	Rikken Seiyūkai	
Gifu-2nd	Tōichirō Itō	Rikken Minseitō	
Gifu-2nd	Takeo Mitamura	Tōhōkai	
Gifu-3rd	Ryōzō Makino	Rikken Seiyūkai	
Gifu-3rd	Yoshitaka Furuya	Rikken Minseitō	
Gifu-3rd	Ryōzō Katō	Shakai Taishūtō	
Shizuoka-1st	Junsaku Yamada	Rikken Minseitō	
Shizuoka-1st	Toyotarō Fukazawa	Rikken Seiyūkai	
Shizuoka-1st	Chūgorō Yamaguchi	Rikken Seiyūkai	
Shizuoka-1st	Mitsuo Hirano	Rikken Minseitō	
Shizuoka-1st	Yūichirō Miyamoto	Rikken Seiyūkai	
Shizuoka-2nd	Kenji Yamazaki	Shakai Taishūtō	
Shizuoka-2nd	Shōzō Shiokawa	Rikken Seiyūkai	
Shizuoka-2nd	Kumetarō Takagi	Rikken Minseitō	
Shizuoka-2nd	Seishō Haruna	First Dietmen Club	
Shizuoka-3rd	Masataka Ōta	Rikken Seiyūkai	
Shizuoka-3rd	Kamesaku Tsukura	Rikken Minseitō	
Shizuoka-3rd	Yōichi Kuramoto	Rikken Seiyūkai	
Shizuoka-3rd	Sen'ichirō Sakashita	Rikken Minseitō	
Aichi-1st	Zō Tsukamoto	Rikken Minseitō	
Aichi-1st	Shōju Koyama	Rikken Minseitō	
Aichi-1st	Sakiichi Hattori	Rikken Minseitō	
Aichi-1st	Benkyō Shiio	Second Waiting Room	
Aichi-1st	Tsunekichi Yamazaki	First Dietmen Club	
Aichi-2nd	Kōzō Andō	First Dietmen Club	
Aichi-2nd	Zen'uemon Higuchi	Rikken Seiyūkai	
Aichi-2nd	Mojūrō Tange	Rikken Seiyūkai	
Aichi-3rd	Chōichi Katō	Rikken Minseitō	
Aichi-3rd	Masao Taki	Independent	
Aichi-3rd	Tamasaburō Watanabe	Rikken Minseitō	
Aichi-4th	Ichizō Ōno	Rikken Minseitō	
Aichi-4th	Jitsutarō Okamoto	Rikken Minseitō	
Aichi-4th	Sankurō Ogasawara	Rikken Seiyūkai	
Aichi-5th	Shōgo Suzuki	First Dietmen Club	
Aichi-5th	Kiroku Ōguchi	Rikken Seiyūkai	
Aichi-5th	Takeo Sugiura	Tōhōkai	
Mie-1st	Kumeshirō Katō	Rikken Seiyūkai	
Mie-1st	Masakazu Matsuda	Rikken Minseitō	
Mie-1st	Tsunekazu Kataoka	Rikken Minseitō	
Mie-1st	Katsu Kawasaki	Rikken Minseitō	
Mie-1st	Jirō Umaoka	Rikken Seiyūkai	
Mie-2nd	Yukio Ozaki	Second Waiting Room	
Mie-2nd	Bunpei Hamachi	Rikken Seiyūkai	
Mie-2nd	Gen Nagai	Rikken Minseitō	
Mie-2nd	Kunimatsu Hamada	Rikken Seiyūkai	
Shiga	Yasujirō Tsutsumi	Rikken Minseitō	
Shiga	Ryōkan Aoki	Rikken Minseitō	
Shiga	Kōtarō Mori	Rikken Seiyūkai	
Shiga	Yōtatsu Tanaka	Tōhōkai	
Shiga	Iwakichi Hattori	Rikken Seiyūkai	
Kyoto-1st	Chōsaburō Mizutani	Shakai Taishūtō	
Kyoto-1st	Sannojō Nakamura	Rikken Minseitō	
Kyoto-1st	Sekijirō Fukuda	Rikken Minseitō	
Kyoto-1st	Kinzaburō Nishimura	Rikken Minseitō	
Kyoto-1st	Naozaburō Era	Rikken Seiyūkai	
Kyoto-2nd	Suegorō Kawasaki	Rikken Minseitō	
Kyoto-2nd	Jinshirō Ikemoto	Rikken Minseitō	
Kyoto-2nd	Kō Tanaka	Rikken Seiyūkai	
Kyoto-3rd	Hitoshi Ashida	Rikken Seiyūkai	
Kyoto-3rd	Takeshi Tsuhara	Rikken Minseitō	
Kyoto-3rd	Kunikichi Murakami	Rikken Minseitō	
Osaka-1st	Kiyoomi Taman	Shakai Taishūtō	
Osaka-1st	Tomozō Itano	Rikken Seiyūkai	
Osaka-1st	Sadayoshi Hitotsumatsu	Rikken Minseitō	
Osaka-2nd	Shinkurō Murayasu	Rikken Minseitō	
Osaka-2nd	Yoshiji Yamamoto	Rikken Seiyūkai	
Osaka-2nd	Ryōji Inoue	Shakai Taishūtō	
Osaka-3rd	Jūzō Tsukamoto	Shakai Taishūtō	
Osaka-3rd	Tadayoshi Ikezaki	Second Waiting Room	
Osaka-3rd	Masatake Naitō	Rikken Minseitō	
Osaka-3rd	Kōkichi Ueda	Rikken Seiyūkai	
Osaka-4th	Yasutarō Kawamura	Shakai Taishūtō	
Osaka-4th	Suehiro Nishio	Shakai Taishūtō	
Osaka-4th	Fukuzō Nakayama	Rikken Minseitō	
Osaka-4th	Yaichirō Honda	Rikken Minseitō	
Osaka-5th	Motojirō Sugiyama	Shakai Taishūtō	
Osaka-5th	Eikichi Katsuta	Rikken Minseitō	
Osaka-5th	Man'itsu Tanaka	Rikken Minseitō	
Osaka-5th	Giichi Sowa	Rikken Seiyūkai	
Osaka-6th	Toyomitsu Isaka	First Dietmen Club	
Osaka-6th	Takechiyo Matsuda	Rikken Minseitō	
Osaka-6th	Teizō Minami	Rikken Seiyūkai	
Hyōgo-1st	Jōtarō Kawakami	Shakai Taishūtō	
Hyōgo-1st	Kazuo Nakai	Rikken Seiyūkai	
Hyōgo-1st	Kazuo Nagae	Shakai Taishūtō	
Hyōgo-1st	Bun'ichirō Noda	Rikken Minseitō	
Hyōgo-1st	Tetsutarō Hamano	Rikken Minseitō	
Hyōgo-2nd	Fusanosuke Maeda	Rikken Minseitō	
Hyōgo-2nd	Mitsusuke Yonekubo	Shakai Taishūtō	
Hyōgo-2nd	Fusanosuke Kobayashi	Rikken Minseitō	
Hyōgo-2nd	Osamu Tatsukawa	Rikken Seiyūkai	
Hyōgo-3rd	Kinuji Kobayashi	Rikken Seiyūkai	
Hyōgo-3rd	Giichi Kawai	Shakai Taishūtō	
Hyōgo-3rd	Gensaburō Tanaka	Rikken Seiyūkai	
Hyōgo-4th	Ichirō Kiyose	First Dietmen Club	
Hyōgo-4th	Takeo Tanaka	Rikken Minseitō	
Hyōgo-4th	Sōbee Hara	Rikken Seiyūkai	
Hyōgo-4th	Toranosuke Kobata	Rikken Minseitō	
Hyōgo-5th	Takao Saitō	Rikken Minseitō	
Hyōgo-5th	Sadao Wakamiya	Rikken Seiyūkai	
Hyōgo-5th	Yorisaburō Yamakawa	Rikken Seiyūkai	
Nara	Genkurō Etō	First Dietmen Club	
Nara	Jinzō Fukui	Rikken Seiyūkai	
Nara	Eizō Mori	Rikken Seiyūkai	
Nara	Shirō Matsuo	Rikken Minseitō	
Nara	Itsurō Yagi	Rikken Minseitō	
Wakayama-1st	Tsunejirō Matsuyama	Rikken Seiyūkai	
Wakayama-1st	Shūichirō Kimoto	Rikken Seiyūkai	
Wakayama-1st	Ikuhei Nishida	Rikken Minseitō	
Wakayama-2nd	Tanizō Koyama	Rikken Minseitō	
Wakayama-2nd	Toyokichi Tabuchi	Second Waiting Room	
Wakayama-2nd	Kōichi Sekō	Rikken Seiyūkai	
Tottori	Naomichi Inada	Rikken Seiyūkai	
Tottori	Norishige Yamamasu	Rikken Minseitō	
Tottori	Hideyuki Miyoshi	Rikken Minseitō	
Tottori	Osamu Toyoda	First Dietmen Club	
Shimane-1st	Yukio Sakurauchi	Rikken Minseitō	
Shimane-1st	Fujirō Hara	Rikken Minseitō	
Shimane-1st	Enzaburō Takahashi	Rikken Seiyūkai	
Shimane-2nd	Toshio Shimada	Rikken Seiyūkai	
Shimane-2nd	Magoichi Tawara	Rikken Minseitō	
Shimane-2nd	Kamazō Okishima	Rikken Seiyūkai	
Okayama-1st	Tomoyuki Kuyama	Rikken Seiyūkai	
Okayama-1st	Tadahiko Okada	Rikken Seiyūkai	
Okayama-1st	Kakuji Yukiyoshi	Rikken Seiyūkai	
Okayama-1st	Hisao Kuroda	Shakai Taishūtō	
Okayama-1st	Tomoyoshi Tamano	First Dietmen Club	
Okayama-2nd	Gōtarō Ogawa	Rikken Minseitō	
Okayama-2nd	Tanjirō Nishimura	Rikken Minseitō	
Okayama-2nd	Takeru Inukai	Rikken Seiyūkai	
Okayama-2nd	Nirō Hoshishima	Rikken Seiyūkai	
Okayama-2nd	Setsuo Kotani	Rikken Seiyūkai	
Hiroshima-1st	Masaki Kishida	First Dietmen Club	
Hiroshima-1st	Kisanda Furuta	Rikken Minseitō	
Hiroshima-1st	Kan'ichi Nagawa	Rikken Seiyūkai	
Hiroshima-1st	Wakami Fujita	Rikken Minseitō	
Hiroshima-2nd	Shichirō Kihara	Rikken Minseitō	
Hiroshima-2nd	Keisuke Mochizuki	First Dietmen Club	
Hiroshima-2nd	Jōichi Yamaji	Rikken Minseitō	
Hiroshima-2nd	Takuji Hida	Rikken Seiyūkai	
Hiroshima-3rd	Tadanori Nagayama	First Dietmen Club	
Hiroshima-3rd	Yutaka Tsuchiya	Rikken Minseitō	
Hiroshima-3rd	Takatarō Sakuta	Rikken Minseitō	
Hiroshima-3rd	Yutaka Miyazawa	Rikken Seiyūkai	
Hiroshima-3rd	Fukuichi Morita	Rikken Seiyūkai	
Yamaguchi-1st	Sadaichi Nishikawa	Rikken Seiyūkai	
Yamaguchi-1st	Sakuo Aoki	Tōhōkai	
Yamaguchi-1st	Shintarō Shō	Rikken Seiyūkai	
Yamaguchi-1st	Kan Abe	First Dietmen Club	
Yamaguchi-2nd	Shigeo Nishimura	Rikken Seiyūkai	
Yamaguchi-2nd	Yoshimichi Kuboi	First Dietmen Club	
Yamaguchi-2nd	Gorō Kunimitsu	Rikken Seiyūkai	
Yamaguchi-2nd	Yasuo Fukuda	Rikken Minseitō	
Yamaguchi-2nd	Jisuke Nakano	Rikken Seiyūkai	
Tokushima-1st	Wahei Ikuta	Rikken Seiyūkai	
Tokushima-1st	Hidekichi Tamura	Rikken Minseitō	
Tokushima-1st	Akira Kōro	Rikken Seiyūkai	
Tokushima-2nd	Katsu Manabe	Rikken Minseitō	
Tokushima-2nd	Kiyoshi Akita	First Dietmen Club	
Tokushima-2nd	Takeo Miki	Second Waiting Room	
Kagawa-1st	Shōichi Maekawa	Shakai Taishūtō	
Kagawa-1st	Sutesuke Fujimoto	First Dietmen Club	
Kagawa-1st	Chōkichi Miyawaki	Rikken Seiyūkai	
Kagawa-2nd	Chūzō Mitsuchi	Rikken Seiyūkai	
Kagawa-2nd	Shōtarō Yano	Rikken Minseitō	
Kagawa-2nd	Ihei Matsuura	Rikken Seiyūkai	
Ehime-1st	Yūki Takechi	Rikken Minseitō	
Ehime-1st	Kisaburō Matsuda	Rikken Minseitō	
Ehime-1st	Sadatarō Ōmoto	Rikken Seiyūkai	
Ehime-2nd	Tetsuta Kawakami	Rikken Seiyūkai	
Ehime-2nd	Torakichi Ono	Rikken Minseitō	
Ehime-2nd	Takeo Murase	Rikken Minseitō	
Ehime-3rd	Shigemasa Sunada	Rikken Seiyūkai	
Ehime-3rd	Kametarō Takabatake	Rikken Seiyūkai	
Ehime-3rd	Monshirō Murakami	Rikken Minseitō	
Kōchi-1st	Masaru Ōishi	Tōhōkai	
Kōchi-1st	Kōjirō Tomita	Rikken Minseitō	
Kōchi-1st	Nagahiro Nagano	Rikken Minseitō	
Kōchi-2nd	Haruki Satake	Shakai Taishūtō	
Kōchi-2nd	Yoshiaki Yorimitsu	Rikken Seiyūkai	
Kōchi-2nd	Jōji Hayashi	Rikken Seiyūkai	
Fukuoka-1st	Seigō Nakano	Tōhōkai	
Fukuoka-1st	Jiichirō Matsumoto	Shakai Taishūtō	
Fukuoka-1st	Tsuneo Kangyū	First Dietmen Club	
Fukuoka-1st	Hatsutarō Haraguchi	Rikken Seiyūkai	
Fukuoka-2nd	Kan'ichirō Kamei	Shakai Taishūtō	
Fukuoka-2nd	Seigo Tajiri	Rikken Seiyūkai	
Fukuoka-2nd	Tokuji Ishii	Rikken Seiyūkai	
Fukuoka-2nd	Katsutarō Tajima	Rikken Minseitō	
Fukuoka-2nd	Sanzō Matsuo	Rikken Minseitō	
Fukuoka-3rd	Shunsaku Noda	Rikken Seiyūkai	
Fukuoka-3rd	Tatsunosuke Yamazaki	First Dietmen Club	
Fukuoka-3rd	Sōichi Tsuru	Rikken Seiyūkai	
Fukuoka-3rd	Gen'ya Masunaga	Rikken Seiyūkai	
Fukuoka-3rd	Ryūichi Okano	Rikken Minseitō	
Fukuoka-4th	Masanori Katsu	Rikken Minseitō	
Fukuoka-4th	Kaiichirō Suematsu	Rikken Minseitō	
Fukuoka-4th	Haruji Tahara	Shakai Taishūtō	
Fukuoka-4th	Shirō Koike	First Dietmen Club	
Saga-1st	Hideo Ikeda	Rikken Minseitō	
Saga-1st	Hōichi Nakano	Rikken Minseitō	
Saga-1st	Ryōichi Tanaka	Rikken Seiyūkai	
Saga-2nd	Yasutarō Fujio	Rikken Seiyūkai	
Saga-2nd	Toshitami Ichinose	Rikken Seiyūkai	
Saga-2nd	Tokiichirō Aino	Rikken Minseitō	
Nagasaki-1st	Motoharu Baba	Tōhōkai	
Nagasaki-1st	Takejirō Nishioka	Rikken Seiyūkai	
Nagasaki-1st	Shōhachirō Kuranari	Rikken Seiyūkai	
Nagasaki-1st	Fujio Nakamura	Rikken Minseitō	
Nagasaki-1st	Riichi Ōta	Rikken Seiyūkai	
Nagasaki-2nd	Kōzō Makiyama	Rikken Minseitō	
Nagasaki-2nd	Hajime Mori	First Dietmen Club	
Nagasaki-2nd	Takashi Kawasoe	Rikken Minseitō	
Nagasaki-2nd	Hitsuo Saho	Rikken Seiyūkai	
Kumamoto-1st	Kenzō Adachi	First Dietmen Club	
Kumamoto-1st	Tsuruhei Matsuno	Rikken Seiyūkai	
Kumamoto-1st	Masayoshi Kimura	Rikken Seiyūkai	
Kumamoto-1st	Shigeru Ishizaka	First Dietmen Club	
Kumamoto-1st	Tadao Ōasa	Rikken Minseitō	
Kumamoto-2nd	Tomito Izu	First Dietmen Club	
Kumamoto-2nd	Nobufusa Miyoshi	Rikken Seiyūkai	
Kumamoto-2nd	Michio Sakata	Rikken Seiyūkai	
Kumamoto-2nd	Nasogorō Komiyama	Rikken Seiyūkai	
Kumamoto-2nd	Toshikatsu Kurahara	First Dietmen Club	
Ōita-1st	Tsuneo Kanemitsu	Rikken Seiyūkai	
Ōita-1st	Fusajirō Ichinomiya	Rikken Minseitō	
Ōita-1st	Tsunayoshi Nagano	Rikken Minseitō	
Ōita-1st	Sunao Ono	Rikken Seiyūkai	
Ōita-2nd	Jūji Shigematsu	Rikken Minseitō	
Ōita-2nd	Kikuo Kiyose	Rikken Seiyūkai	
Ōita-2nd	Kentarō Ayabe	Rikken Seiyūkai	
Miyazaki	Iwao Itō	Rikken Seiyūkai	
Miyazaki	Torao Miura	Tōhōkai	
Miyazaki	Shigetaka Sogi	First Dietmen Club	
Miyazaki	Kentarō Suzuki	Rikken Minseitō	
Miyazaki	Gunkichi Jin	First Dietmen Club	
Kagoshima-1st	Tomoharu Inoue	Rikken Seiyūkai	
Kagoshima-1st	Jun'ya Koizumi	Rikken Minseitō	
Kagoshima-1st	Kōjirō Matsukata	Second Waiting Room	
Kagoshima-1st	Naotake Tsuzaki	First Dietmen Club	
Kagoshima-1st	Sanshirō Kurasono	First Dietmen Club	
Kagoshima-2nd	Eiji Tomiyoshi	Shakai Taishūtō	
Kagoshima-2nd	Minoru Tōgō	Rikken Seiyūkai	
Kagoshima-2nd	Ichimasa Terada	Rikken Seiyūkai	
Kagoshima-2nd	Eijirō Iwamoto	Rikken Seiyūkai	
Kagoshima-3rd	Ryōkichi Nagata	Rikken Seiyūkai	
Kagoshima-3rd	Masao Kanai	First Dietmen Club	
Kagoshima-3rd	Saburō Kobayashi	Rikken Minseitō	
Okinawa	Kenwa Kanna	Rikken Minseitō	
Okinawa	Hajime Irei	First Dietmen Club	
Okinawa	Sōichi Nakaima	Rikken Minseitō	
Okinawa	Shichō Sakiyama	Rikken Seiyūkai	
Okinawa	Meichō Morishima	Rikken Seiyūkai	

The composition as of 7 August 1937, the final day of this session, was the same as the first day.

=== 72nd Imperial Diet ===
Composition of the House of Representatives of Japan (as of September 4, 1937, first day of the 72nd Imperial Diet) (elected in 1937; term: 30 April 1937 – 25 March 1942)
Parliamentary groups/caucuses	Parties	Seats
Rikken Minseitō	Rikken Minseitō	179
Rikken Seiyūkai	Rikken Seiyūkai	174
First Dietmen Club; Daiichi Giin Club	Kokumin Dōmei (11); Japan Renovation Party (4); Kōdōkai (1); Independents (33)	49
Shakai Taishūtō	Shakai Taishūtō	36
Second Waiting Room; Daini Hikaeshitsu	Japan Proletarian Party (1); Shinano Veterans Brotherhood (1); Rikken Yōseikai (1); Meirinkai (1); Independents (9)	13
Tōhōkai	Tōhōkai	11
Independents (not member of a caucus); Mushozoku	Independents (not member of a party); Speaker (Rikken Minseitō); Deputy Speaker (Rikken Seiyūkai)	4
Total		466

Detailed composition
Constituency	Members	Parliamentary Group	Notes
Hokkaido-1st	Kōzō Yamamoto	Rikken Minseitō	
Hokkaido-1st	Junsuke Itaya	Rikken Seiyūkai	
Hokkaido-1st	Rikichi Sawada	Rikken Minseitō	
Hokkaido-1st	Nakajirō Ichiyanagi	Rikken Minseitō	
Hokkaido-2nd	Takeshi Azuma	Rikken Seiyūkai	
Hokkaido-2nd	Roichi Hayashi	First Dietmen Club	
Hokkaido-2nd	Kōtarō Bandō	Rikken Minseitō	
Hokkaido-2nd	Shūtarō Matsuura	Rikken Minseitō	
Hokkaido-3rd	Torakichi Ōshima	Rikken Minseitō	
Hokkaido-3rd	Yasukuni Watanabe	Tōhōkai	
Hokkaido-3rd	Shōji Tashiro	Rikken Seiyūkai	
Hokkaido-4th	Katsumaro Akamatsu	First Dietmen Club	
Hokkaido-4th	Ryūkichi Teshirogi	Rikken Minseitō	
Hokkaido-4th	Katsutarō Kita	First Dietmen Club	
Hokkaido-4th	Haruo Okada	Rikken Minseitō	
Hokkaido-4th	Tokuo Nanjō	Rikken Seiyūkai	
Hokkaido-5th	Fusakichi Tōyama	Rikken Minseitō	
Hokkaido-5th	Shigetarō Kinoshita	Rikken Seiyūkai	
Hokkaido-5th	Tei Tōjō	Rikken Seiyūkai	
Hokkaido-5th	Seisaku Nagumo	Rikken Minseitō	
Aomori-1st	Yasomi Ogasawara	Rikken Seiyūkai	
Aomori-1st	Tetsuo Kudō	Rikken Minseitō	
Aomori-1st	Jūjirō Morita	Rikken Minseitō	
Aomori-2nd	Ken'ichi Ono	Tōhōkai	
Aomori-2nd	Tosao Kudō	Rikken Seiyūkai	
Aomori-2nd	Ryūichi Kikuchi	Rikken Minseitō	
Iwate-1st	Ichimin Tago	Rikken Seiyūkai	
Iwate-1st	Jutarō Takahashi	Rikken Minseitō	
Iwate-1st	Saburō Yasumi	Rikken Seiyūkai	
Iwate-2nd	Kunisaburō Izumi	Rikken Seiyūkai	
Iwate-2nd	Shōzō Matsukawa	Rikken Seiyūkai	
Iwate-2nd	Yūsuke Tsurumi	Rikken Minseitō	
Iwate-2nd	Watari Shiga	Rikken Seiyūkai	
Miyagi-1st	Sakusaburō Uchigasaki	Rikken Minseitō	
Miyagi-1st	Yōnosuke Kikuchi	Shakai Taishūtō	
Miyagi-1st	Ichirō Shōji	Rikken Seiyūkai	
Miyagi-1st	Eifu Moriya	First Dietmen Club	
Miyagi-1st	Seisaku Miyazawa	Rikken Seiyūkai	
Miyagi-2nd	Hisayoshi Muramatsu	Rikken Minseitō	
Miyagi-2nd	Kuranosuke Oyama	Rikken Minseitō	
Miyagi-2nd	Rinji Ōishi	Rikken Seiyūkai	
Akita-1st	Chūji Machida	Rikken Minseitō	
Akita-1st	Giemon Shida	Rikken Minseitō	
Akita-1st	Gichoku Nakata	Rikken Seiyūkai	
Akita-1st	Shigeharu Nakagawa	Rikken Minseitō	
Akita-2nd	Seion Kawamata	Shakai Taishūtō	
Akita-2nd	Yoshitaka Oyamada	Rikken Seiyūkai	
Akita-2nd	Sōsuke Tsuchida	Rikken Minseitō	
Yamagata-1st	Takeo Kimura	Tōhōkai	
Yamagata-1st	Kumajirō Takahashi	Rikken Seiyūkai	
Yamagata-1st	Toshima Nishikata	Rikken Seiyūkai	
Yamagata-1st	Hiraku Satō	First Dietmen Club	
Yamagata-2nd	Toshizō Matsuoka	Rikken Seiyūkai	
Yamagata-2nd	Naota Kumagai	Rikken Seiyūkai	
Yamagata-2nd	Gorō Itō	Rikken Minseitō	
Yamagata-2nd	Tokutarō Shizumi	Rikken Minseitō	
Fukushima-1st	Hiroshi Momiyama	Rikken Minseitō	
Fukushima-1st	Morio Kugimoto	Rikken Minseitō	
Fukushima-1st	Zen'emon Kanno	Rikken Seiyūkai	
Fukushima-2nd	Sōkichi Hatta	Rikken Seiyūkai	
Fukushima-2nd	Saburō Nakanishi	Rikken Minseitō	
Fukushima-2nd	Keishirō Sukekawa	Rikken Seiyūkai	
Fukushima-2nd	Torakichi Nakano	First Dietmen Club	
Fukushima-2nd	Heima Hayashi	Rikken Minseitō	
Fukushima-3rd	Shōhei Hisa	Rikken Minseitō	
Fukushima-3rd	Hajime Hoshi	Rikken Seiyūkai	
Fukushima-3rd	Rokurō Yamada	Rikken Minseitō	
Ibaraki-1st	Nobuya Uchida	First Dietmen Club	
Ibaraki-1st	Toshihide Nakazaki	Rikken Minseitō	
Ibaraki-1st	Toyokichi Toyota	Rikken Minseitō	
Ibaraki-1st	Shingorō Hanashi	Rikken Seiyūkai	
Ibaraki-2nd	Hiroshi Nakaigawa	Rikken Minseitō	
Ibaraki-2nd	Minotarō Kawasaki	Rikken Seiyūkai	
Ibaraki-2nd	Takenosuke Ōuchi	Rikken Seiyūkai	
Ibaraki-3rd	Akira Kazami	Independent	
Ibaraki-3rd	Munenori Akagi	First Dietmen Club	
Ibaraki-3rd	Yōnosuke Satō	Rikken Seiyūkai	
Ibaraki-3rd	Gorō Iimura	First Dietmen Club	
Tochigi-1st	Naka Funada	Rikken Seiyūkai	
Tochigi-1st	Unpei Takada	Rikken Minseitō	
Tochigi-1st	Tokuya Tsuboyama	Rikken Seiyūkai	
Tochigi-1st	Saburō Ehara	Rikken Seiyūkai	
Tochigi-1st	Kikuji Okada	Rikken Minseitō	
Tochigi-2nd	Kunio Morishita	Rikken Minseitō	
Tochigi-2nd	Kōzō Matsumura	Rikken Seiyūkai	
Tochigi-2nd	Jūkichi Odaira	Rikken Seiyūkai	
Tochigi-2nd	Asashichi Kimura	Rikken Minseitō	
Gunma-1st	Chikuhei Nakajima	Rikken Seiyūkai	
Gunma-1st	Seiichi Aoki	First Dietmen Club	
Gunma-1st	Kō Sunaga	Shakai Taishūtō	
Gunma-1st	Harutarō Iizuka	Rikken Minseitō	
Gunma-1st	Tomesaburō Shizumi	Rikken Minseitō	
Gunma-2nd	Yoshimasa Shinohara	Rikken Seiyūkai	
Gunma-2nd	Masazō Mogami	Rikken Minseitō	
Gunma-2nd	Sanshirō Kogure	Rikken Seiyūkai	
Gunma-2nd	Budayū Kogure	Rikken Seiyūkai	
Saitama-1st	Tō Matsunaga	Rikken Minseitō	
Saitama-1st	Hajime Miyazaki	Rikken Seiyūkai	
Saitama-1st	Yasuo Takahashi	Rikken Seiyūkai	
Saitama-1st	Yoshio Matsunaga	Shakai Taishūtō	
Saitama-2nd	Morihei Takahashi	Rikken Minseitō	
Saitama-2nd	Jūji Yokokawa	Rikken Seiyūkai	
Saitama-2nd	Yōhei Ishizaka	Rikken Seiyūkai	
Saitama-2nd	Sōtarō Sakamoto	First Dietmen Club	
Saitama-3rd	Tetsuya Nonaka	First Dietmen Club	
Saitama-3rd	Hyōkichi Idei	Rikken Seiyūkai	
Saitama-3rd	Yoshihide Furushima	Rikken Minseitō	
Chiba-1st	Mitsunaga Tada	Rikken Minseitō	
Chiba-1st	Rokurō Shinohara	Rikken Minseitō	
Chiba-1st	Isamu Narushima	Rikken Minseitō	
Chiba-1st	Shōjirō Kawashima	Rikken Seiyūkai	
Chiba-2nd	Takehiko Imai	Rikken Seiyūkai	
Chiba-2nd	Shōryō Yoshiue	Rikken Seiyūkai	
Chiba-2nd	Shirō Uga	Rikken Minseitō	
Chiba-3rd	Akira Iwase	Rikken Seiyūkai	
Chiba-3rd	Chōsaburō Odaka	Rikken Seiyūkai	
Chiba-3rd	Seisaburō Tsuchiya	Rikken Minseitō	
Chiba-3rd	Seishū Ikeda	Rikken Minseitō	
Tokyo-1st	Mitsu Kōno	Shakai Taishūtō	
Tokyo-1st	Tamashige Hara	Rikken Minseitō	
Tokyo-1st	Yoshitsugu Takahashi	Rikken Minseitō	
Tokyo-1st	Seiichirō Dōke	Second Waiting Room	
Tokyo-1st	Yoshinari Honda	Rikken Seiyūkai	
Tokyo-2nd	Isoo Abe	Shakai Taishūtō	
Tokyo-2nd	Ichirō Hatoyama	Rikken Seiyūkai	
Tokyo-2nd	Yadanji Nakajima	Rikken Minseitō	
Tokyo-2nd	Jūji Komai	Rikken Minseitō	
Tokyo-2nd	Takaichi Nagano	Rikken Minseitō	
Tokyo-3rd	Keikichi Tanomogi	Rikken Minseitō	
Tokyo-3rd	Inejirō Asanuma	Shakai Taishūtō	
Tokyo-3rd	Daikichirō Tagawa	Second Waiting Room	
Tokyo-3rd	Masazumi Andō	Rikken Seiyūkai	
Tokyo-4th	Shigeo Abe	Shakai Taishūtō	
Tokyo-4th	Gijū Manabe	Rikken Minseitō	
Tokyo-4th	Shichirō Takizawa	Rikken Seiyūkai	
Tokyo-4th	Park Chun-geum	First Dietmen Club	
Tokyo-5th	Hisashi Asō	Shakai Taishūtō	
Tokyo-5th	Kanjū Katō	Second Waiting Room	
Tokyo-5th	Teikichi Shiba	Rikken Minseitō	
Tokyo-5th	Jusō Miwa	Shakai Taishūtō	
Tokyo-5th	Shizuo Makino	Rikken Seiyūkai	
Tokyo-6th	Bunji Suzuki	Shakai Taishūtō	
Tokyo-6th	Yonezō Maeda	Rikken Seiyūkai	
Tokyo-6th	Kiyoshi Yamada	Rikken Minseitō	
Tokyo-6th	Umekichi Nakamura	Rikken Minseitō	
Tokyo-6th	Gen Tanaka	Rikken Seiyūkai	
Tokyo-7th	Takeji Yatsunami	Rikken Minseitō	
Tokyo-7th	Takaichi Nakamura	Shakai Taishūtō	
Tokyo-7th	Kunitoshi Tsukumo	Rikken Seiyūkai	
Kanagawa-1st	Ken Okazaki	Shakai Taishūtō	
Kanagawa-1st	Sukeo Iida	Rikken Minseitō	
Kanagawa-1st	Jirō Nogata	Rikken Seiyūkai	
Kanagawa-2nd	Matajirō Koizumi	Rikken Minseitō	
Kanagawa-2nd	Tetsu Katayama	Shakai Taishūtō	
Kanagawa-2nd	Seiichi Ogushi	Rikken Seiyūkai	
Kanagawa-2nd	Kiichi Noguchi	Rikken Seiyūkai	
Kanagawa-3rd	Ichirō Kōno	Rikken Seiyūkai	
Kanagawa-3rd	Matsutarō Hirakawa	Rikken Minseitō	
Kanagawa-3rd	Hideo Suzuki	Rikken Seiyūkai	
Kanagawa-3rd	Kyūjirō Okazaki	Rikken Minseitō	
Niigata-1st	Reikichi Kita	Rikken Minseitō	
Niigata-1st	Teijirō Yamamoto	Rikken Seiyūkai	
Niigata-1st	Gunji Matsui	Rikken Minseitō	
Niigata-2nd	Daisuke Takaoka	First Dietmen Club	
Niigata-2nd	Yoichi Satō	Rikken Minseitō	
Niigata-2nd	Hiromu Matsuki	Rikken Seiyūkai	
Niigata-2nd	Makie Koyanagi	Rikken Minseitō	
Niigata-3rd	Shōichi Miyake	Shakai Taishūtō	
Niigata-3rd	Kan'ichi Ōtake	First Dietmen Club	
Niigata-3rd	Chisei Katō	Rikken Seiyūkai	
Niigata-3rd	Tomenosuke Imanari	Rikken Minseitō	
Niigata-3rd	Kennosuke Satō	Rikken Minseitō	
Niigata-4th	Tokusaburō Takeda	Rikken Seiyūkai	
Niigata-4th	Giichi Masuda	Rikken Minseitō	
Niigata-4th	Naoji Kawai	Rikken Minseitō	
Toyama-1st	Yukimichi Takami	Rikken Seiyūkai	
Toyama-1st	Gonzō Terashima	Rikken Minseitō	
Toyama-1st	Karoku Nomura	Rikken Minseitō	
Toyama-2nd	Kitarō Uota	Rikken Minseitō	
Toyama-2nd	Kenzō Matsumura	Rikken Minseitō	
Toyama-2nd	Sōmei Tsuchikura	Rikken Seiyūkai	
Ishikawa-1st	Ryūtarō Nagai	Rikken Minseitō	
Ishikawa-1st	Chōji Hase	First Dietmen Club	
Ishikawa-1st	Takichi Hashimoto	Rikken Seiyūkai	
Ishikawa-2nd	Hyōgorō Sakurai	Rikken Minseitō	
Ishikawa-2nd	Kenzō Aoyama	Rikken Seiyūkai	
Ishikawa-2nd	Sōichirō Kita	Rikken Minseitō	
Fukui	Toshie Inoke	Rikken Seiyūkai	
Fukui	Keiichirō Soeda	Rikken Minseitō	
Fukui	Hichirōbei Ikeda	Rikken Seiyūkai	
Fukui	Naokitsu Saitō	Rikken Minseitō	
Fukui	Gouemon Kumagai	First Dietmen Club	
Yamanashi	Shichiroku Tanabe	Rikken Seiyūkai	
Yamanashi	Rikizō Hirano	First Dietmen Club	
Yamanashi	Jūji Kasai	First Dietmen Club	
Yamanashi	Ryōhei Horiuchi	Rikken Minseitō	
Yamanashi	Shinzō Imai	Second Waiting Room	
Nagano-1st	Tadao Matsumoto	Rikken Minseitō	
Nagano-1st	Bensaburō Maruyama	Rikken Seiyūkai	
Nagano-1st	Kuniji Tanaka	Rikken Minseitō	
Nagano-2nd	Kunitarō Oyama	Rikken Minseitō	
Nagano-2nd	Makoto Oyama	Second Waiting Room	
Nagano-2nd	Bushirō Hata	Rikken Seiyūkai	
Nagano-3rd	Taneo Miyazawa	Rikken Minseitō	
Nagano-3rd	Achinosuke Kitahara	Rikken Minseitō	
Nagano-3rd	Kinji Nakahara	Second Waiting Room	
Nagano-3rd	Masaru Nomizo	Shakai Taishūtō	
Nagano-4th	Etsujirō Uehara	Rikken Seiyūkai	
Nagano-4th	Wataru Momose	Rikken Minseitō	
Nagano-4th	Kō Tanaka	Second Waiting Room	
Gifu-1st	Kan Kiyoshi	Rikken Minseitō	
Gifu-1st	Eikichi Hikita	Rikken Seiyūkai	
Gifu-1st	Banboku Ōno	Rikken Seiyūkai	
Gifu-2nd	Sakujirō Kimura	Rikken Seiyūkai	
Gifu-2nd	Tōichirō Itō	Rikken Minseitō	
Gifu-2nd	Takeo Mitamura	Tōhōkai	
Gifu-3rd	Ryōzō Makino	Rikken Seiyūkai	
Gifu-3rd	Yoshitaka Furuya	Rikken Minseitō	
Gifu-3rd	Ryōzō Katō	Shakai Taishūtō	
Shizuoka-1st	Junsaku Yamada	Rikken Minseitō	
Shizuoka-1st	Toyotarō Fukazawa	Rikken Seiyūkai	
Shizuoka-1st	Chūgorō Yamaguchi	Rikken Seiyūkai	
Shizuoka-1st	Mitsuo Hirano	Rikken Minseitō	
Shizuoka-1st	Yūichirō Miyamoto	Rikken Seiyūkai	
Shizuoka-2nd	Kenji Yamazaki	Shakai Taishūtō	
Shizuoka-2nd	Shōzō Shiokawa	Rikken Seiyūkai	
Shizuoka-2nd	Kumetarō Takagi	Rikken Minseitō	
Shizuoka-2nd	Seishō Haruna	First Dietmen Club	
Shizuoka-3rd	Masataka Ōta	Rikken Seiyūkai	
Shizuoka-3rd	Kamesaku Tsukura	Rikken Minseitō	
Shizuoka-3rd	Yōichi Kuramoto	Rikken Seiyūkai	
Shizuoka-3rd	Sen'ichirō Sakashita	Rikken Minseitō	
Aichi-1st	Zō Tsukamoto	Rikken Minseitō	
Aichi-1st	Shōju Koyama	Independent	
Aichi-1st	Sakiichi Hattori	Rikken Minseitō	
Aichi-1st	Benkyō Shiio	Second Waiting Room	
Aichi-1st	Tsunekichi Yamazaki	First Dietmen Club	
Aichi-2nd	Kōzō Andō	First Dietmen Club	
Aichi-2nd	Zen'uemon Higuchi	Rikken Seiyūkai	
Aichi-2nd	Mojūrō Tange	Rikken Seiyūkai	
Aichi-3rd	Chōichi Katō	Rikken Minseitō	
Aichi-3rd	Masao Taki	Independent	
Aichi-3rd	Tamasaburō Watanabe	Rikken Minseitō	
Aichi-4th	Ichizō Ōno	Rikken Minseitō	
Aichi-4th	Jitsutarō Okamoto	Rikken Minseitō	
Aichi-4th	Sankurō Ogasawara	Rikken Seiyūkai	
Aichi-5th	Shōgo Suzuki	First Dietmen Club	
Aichi-5th	Kiroku Ōguchi	Rikken Seiyūkai	
Aichi-5th	Takeo Sugiura	Tōhōkai	
Mie-1st	Kumeshirō Katō	Rikken Seiyūkai	
Mie-1st	Masakazu Matsuda	Rikken Minseitō	
Mie-1st	Tsunekazu Kataoka	Rikken Minseitō	
Mie-1st	Katsu Kawasaki	Rikken Minseitō	
Mie-1st	Jirō Umaoka	Rikken Seiyūkai	
Mie-2nd	Yukio Ozaki	Second Waiting Room	
Mie-2nd	Bunpei Hamachi	Rikken Seiyūkai	
Mie-2nd	Gen Nagai	Rikken Minseitō	
Mie-2nd	Kunimatsu Hamada	Rikken Seiyūkai	
Shiga	Yasujirō Tsutsumi	Rikken Minseitō	
Shiga	Ryōkan Aoki	Rikken Minseitō	
Shiga	Kōtarō Mori	Rikken Seiyūkai	
Shiga	Yōtatsu Tanaka	Tōhōkai	
Shiga	Iwakichi Hattori	Rikken Seiyūkai	
Kyoto-1st	Chōsaburō Mizutani	Shakai Taishūtō	
Kyoto-1st	Sannojō Nakamura	Rikken Minseitō	
Kyoto-1st	Sekijirō Fukuda	Rikken Minseitō	
Kyoto-1st	Kinzaburō Nishimura	Rikken Minseitō	
Kyoto-1st	Naozaburō Era	Rikken Seiyūkai	
Kyoto-2nd	Suegorō Kawasaki	Rikken Minseitō	
Kyoto-2nd	Jinshirō Ikemoto	Rikken Minseitō	
Kyoto-2nd	Kō Tanaka	Rikken Seiyūkai	
Kyoto-3rd	Hitoshi Ashida	Rikken Seiyūkai	
Kyoto-3rd	Takeshi Tsuhara	Rikken Minseitō	
Kyoto-3rd	Kunikichi Murakami	Rikken Minseitō	
Osaka-1st	Kiyoomi Taman	Shakai Taishūtō	
Osaka-1st	Tomozō Itano	Rikken Seiyūkai	
Osaka-1st	Sadayoshi Hitotsumatsu	Rikken Minseitō	
Osaka-2nd	Shinkurō Murayasu	Rikken Minseitō	
Osaka-2nd	Yoshiji Yamamoto	Rikken Seiyūkai	
Osaka-2nd	Ryōji Inoue	Shakai Taishūtō	
Osaka-3rd	Jūzō Tsukamoto	Shakai Taishūtō	
Osaka-3rd	Tadayoshi Ikezaki	Second Waiting Room	
Osaka-3rd	Masatake Naitō	Rikken Minseitō	
Osaka-3rd	Kōkichi Ueda	Rikken Seiyūkai	
Osaka-4th	Yasutarō Kawamura	Shakai Taishūtō	
Osaka-4th	Suehiro Nishio	Shakai Taishūtō	
Osaka-4th	Fukuzō Nakayama	Rikken Minseitō	
Osaka-4th	Yaichirō Honda	Rikken Minseitō	
Osaka-5th	Motojirō Sugiyama	Shakai Taishūtō	
Osaka-5th	Eikichi Katsuta	Rikken Minseitō	
Osaka-5th	Man'itsu Tanaka	Rikken Minseitō	
Osaka-5th	Giichi Sowa	Rikken Seiyūkai	
Osaka-6th	Toyomitsu Isaka	First Dietmen Club	
Osaka-6th	Takechiyo Matsuda	Rikken Minseitō	
Osaka-6th	Teizō Minami	Rikken Seiyūkai	
Hyōgo-1st	Jōtarō Kawakami	Shakai Taishūtō	
Hyōgo-1st	Kazuo Nakai	Rikken Seiyūkai	
Hyōgo-1st	Kazuo Nagae	Shakai Taishūtō	
Hyōgo-1st	Bun'ichirō Noda	Rikken Minseitō	
Hyōgo-1st	Tetsutarō Hamano	Rikken Minseitō	
Hyōgo-2nd	Fusanosuke Maeda	Rikken Minseitō	
Hyōgo-2nd	Mitsusuke Yonekubo	Shakai Taishūtō	
Hyōgo-2nd	Fusanosuke Kobayashi	Rikken Minseitō	
Hyōgo-2nd	Osamu Tatsukawa	Rikken Seiyūkai	
Hyōgo-3rd	Kinuji Kobayashi	Rikken Seiyūkai	
Hyōgo-3rd	Giichi Kawai	Shakai Taishūtō	
Hyōgo-3rd	Gensaburō Tanaka	Rikken Seiyūkai	
Hyōgo-4th	Ichirō Kiyose	First Dietmen Club	
Hyōgo-4th	Takeo Tanaka	Rikken Minseitō	
Hyōgo-4th	Sōbee Hara	Rikken Seiyūkai	
Hyōgo-4th	Toranosuke Kobata	Rikken Minseitō	
Hyōgo-5th	Takao Saitō	Rikken Minseitō	
Hyōgo-5th	Sadao Wakamiya	Rikken Seiyūkai	
Hyōgo-5th	Yorisaburō Yamakawa	Rikken Seiyūkai	
Nara	Genkurō Etō	First Dietmen Club	
Nara	Jinzō Fukui	Rikken Seiyūkai	
Nara	Eizō Mori	Rikken Seiyūkai	
Nara	Shirō Matsuo	Rikken Minseitō	
Nara	Itsurō Yagi	Rikken Minseitō	
Wakayama-1st	Tsunejirō Matsuyama	Rikken Seiyūkai	
Wakayama-1st	Shūichirō Kimoto	Rikken Seiyūkai	
Wakayama-1st	Ikuhei Nishida	Rikken Minseitō	
Wakayama-2nd	Tanizō Koyama	Rikken Minseitō	
Wakayama-2nd	Toyokichi Tabuchi	Second Waiting Room	
Wakayama-2nd	Kōichi Sekō	Rikken Seiyūkai	
Tottori	Naomichi Inada	Rikken Seiyūkai	
Tottori	Norishige Yamamasu	Rikken Minseitō	
Tottori	Hideyuki Miyoshi	Rikken Minseitō	
Tottori	Osamu Toyoda	First Dietmen Club	
Shimane-1st	Yukio Sakurauchi	Rikken Minseitō	
Shimane-1st	Fujirō Hara	Rikken Minseitō	
Shimane-1st	Enzaburō Takahashi	Rikken Seiyūkai	
Shimane-2nd	Toshio Shimada	Rikken Seiyūkai	
Shimane-2nd	Magoichi Tawara	Rikken Minseitō	
Shimane-2nd	Kamazō Okishima	Rikken Seiyūkai	
Okayama-1st	Tomoyuki Kuyama	Rikken Seiyūkai	
Okayama-1st	Tadahiko Okada	Rikken Seiyūkai	
Okayama-1st	Kakuji Yukiyoshi	Rikken Seiyūkai	
Okayama-1st	Hisao Kuroda	Shakai Taishūtō	
Okayama-1st	Tomoyoshi Tamano	First Dietmen Club	
Okayama-2nd	Gōtarō Ogawa	Rikken Minseitō	
Okayama-2nd	Tanjirō Nishimura	Rikken Minseitō	
Okayama-2nd	Takeru Inukai	Rikken Seiyūkai	
Okayama-2nd	Nirō Hoshishima	Rikken Seiyūkai	
Okayama-2nd	Setsuo Kotani	Rikken Seiyūkai	
Hiroshima-1st	Masaki Kishida	First Dietmen Club	
Hiroshima-1st	Kisanda Furuta	Rikken Minseitō	
Hiroshima-1st	Kan'ichi Nagawa	Rikken Seiyūkai	
Hiroshima-1st	Wakami Fujita	Rikken Minseitō	
Hiroshima-2nd	Shichirō Kihara	Rikken Minseitō	
Hiroshima-2nd	Keisuke Mochizuki	First Dietmen Club	
Hiroshima-2nd	Jōichi Yamaji	Rikken Minseitō	
Hiroshima-2nd	Takuji Hida	Rikken Seiyūkai	
Hiroshima-3rd	Tadanori Nagayama	First Dietmen Club	
Hiroshima-3rd	Yutaka Tsuchiya	Rikken Minseitō	
Hiroshima-3rd	Takatarō Sakuta	Rikken Minseitō	
Hiroshima-3rd	Yutaka Miyazawa	Rikken Seiyūkai	
Hiroshima-3rd	Fukuichi Morita	Rikken Seiyūkai	
Yamaguchi-1st	Sadaichi Nishikawa	Rikken Seiyūkai	
Yamaguchi-1st	Sakuo Aoki	Tōhōkai	
Yamaguchi-1st	Shintarō Shō	Rikken Seiyūkai	
Yamaguchi-1st	Kan Abe	First Dietmen Club	
Yamaguchi-2nd	Shigeo Nishimura	Rikken Seiyūkai	
Yamaguchi-2nd	Yoshimichi Kuboi	First Dietmen Club	
Yamaguchi-2nd	Gorō Kunimitsu	Rikken Seiyūkai	
Yamaguchi-2nd	Yasuo Fukuda	Rikken Minseitō	
Yamaguchi-2nd	Jisuke Nakano	Rikken Seiyūkai	
Tokushima-1st	Wahei Ikuta	Rikken Seiyūkai	
Tokushima-1st	Hidekichi Tamura	Rikken Minseitō	
Tokushima-1st	Akira Kōro	Rikken Seiyūkai	
Tokushima-2nd	Katsu Manabe	Rikken Minseitō	
Tokushima-2nd	Kiyoshi Akita	First Dietmen Club	
Tokushima-2nd	Takeo Miki	Second Waiting Room	
Kagawa-1st	Shōichi Maekawa	Shakai Taishūtō	
Kagawa-1st	Sutesuke Fujimoto	First Dietmen Club	
Kagawa-1st	Chōkichi Miyawaki	Rikken Seiyūkai	
Kagawa-2nd	Chūzō Mitsuchi	Rikken Seiyūkai	
Kagawa-2nd	Shōtarō Yano	Rikken Minseitō	
Kagawa-2nd	Ihei Matsuura	Rikken Seiyūkai	
Ehime-1st	Yūki Takechi	Rikken Minseitō	
Ehime-1st	Kisaburō Matsuda	Rikken Minseitō	
Ehime-1st	Sadatarō Ōmoto	Rikken Seiyūkai	
Ehime-2nd	Tetsuta Kawakami	Rikken Seiyūkai	
Ehime-2nd	Torakichi Ono	Rikken Minseitō	
Ehime-2nd	Takeo Murase	Rikken Minseitō	
Ehime-3rd	Shigemasa Sunada	Rikken Seiyūkai	
Ehime-3rd	Kametarō Takabatake	Rikken Seiyūkai	
Ehime-3rd	Monshirō Murakami	Rikken Minseitō	
Kōchi-1st	Masaru Ōishi	Tōhōkai	
Kōchi-1st	Kōjirō Tomita	Rikken Minseitō	
Kōchi-1st	Nagahiro Nagano	Rikken Minseitō	
Kōchi-2nd	Haruki Satake	Shakai Taishūtō	
Kōchi-2nd	Yoshiaki Yorimitsu	Rikken Seiyūkai	
Kōchi-2nd	Jōji Hayashi	Rikken Seiyūkai	
Fukuoka-1st	Seigō Nakano	Tōhōkai	
Fukuoka-1st	Jiichirō Matsumoto	Shakai Taishūtō	
Fukuoka-1st	Tsuneo Kangyū	First Dietmen Club	
Fukuoka-1st	Hatsutarō Haraguchi	Rikken Seiyūkai	
Fukuoka-2nd	Kan'ichirō Kamei	Shakai Taishūtō	
Fukuoka-2nd	Seigo Tajiri	Rikken Seiyūkai	
Fukuoka-2nd	Tokuji Ishii	Rikken Seiyūkai	
Fukuoka-2nd	Katsutarō Tajima	Rikken Minseitō	
Fukuoka-2nd	Sanzō Matsuo	Rikken Minseitō	
Fukuoka-3rd	Shunsaku Noda	Rikken Seiyūkai	
Fukuoka-3rd	Tatsunosuke Yamazaki	First Dietmen Club	
Fukuoka-3rd	Sōichi Tsuru	Rikken Seiyūkai	
Fukuoka-3rd	Gen'ya Masunaga	Rikken Seiyūkai	
Fukuoka-3rd	Ryūichi Okano	Rikken Minseitō	
Fukuoka-4th	Masanori Katsu	Rikken Minseitō	
Fukuoka-4th	Kaiichirō Suematsu	Rikken Minseitō	
Fukuoka-4th	Haruji Tahara	Shakai Taishūtō	
Fukuoka-4th	Shirō Koike	First Dietmen Club	
Saga-1st	Hideo Ikeda	Rikken Minseitō	
Saga-1st	Hōichi Nakano	Rikken Minseitō	
Saga-1st	Ryōichi Tanaka	Rikken Seiyūkai	
Saga-2nd	Yasutarō Fujio	Rikken Seiyūkai	
Saga-2nd	Toshitami Ichinose	Rikken Seiyūkai	
Saga-2nd	Tokiichirō Aino	Rikken Minseitō	
Nagasaki-1st	Motoharu Baba	Tōhōkai	
Nagasaki-1st	Takejirō Nishioka	Rikken Seiyūkai	
Nagasaki-1st	Shōhachirō Kuranari	Rikken Seiyūkai	
Nagasaki-1st	Fujio Nakamura	Rikken Minseitō	
Nagasaki-1st	Riichi Ōta	Rikken Seiyūkai	
Nagasaki-2nd	Kōzō Makiyama	Rikken Minseitō	
Nagasaki-2nd	Hajime Mori	First Dietmen Club	
Nagasaki-2nd	Takashi Kawasoe	Rikken Minseitō	
Nagasaki-2nd	Hitsuo Saho	Rikken Seiyūkai	
Kumamoto-1st	Kenzō Adachi	First Dietmen Club	
Kumamoto-1st	Tsuruhei Matsuno	Rikken Seiyūkai	
Kumamoto-1st	Masayoshi Kimura	Rikken Seiyūkai	
Kumamoto-1st	Shigeru Ishizaka	First Dietmen Club	
Kumamoto-1st	Tadao Ōasa	Rikken Minseitō	
Kumamoto-2nd	Tomito Izu	First Dietmen Club	
Kumamoto-2nd	Nobufusa Miyoshi	Rikken Seiyūkai	
Kumamoto-2nd	Michio Sakata	Rikken Seiyūkai	
Kumamoto-2nd	Nasogorō Komiyama	Rikken Seiyūkai	
Kumamoto-2nd	Toshikatsu Kurahara	First Dietmen Club	
Ōita-1st	Tsuneo Kanemitsu	Independent	
Ōita-1st	Fusajirō Ichinomiya	Rikken Minseitō	
Ōita-1st	Tsunayoshi Nagano	Rikken Minseitō	
Ōita-1st	Sunao Ono	Rikken Seiyūkai	
Ōita-2nd	Jūji Shigematsu	Rikken Minseitō	
Ōita-2nd	Kikuo Kiyose	Rikken Seiyūkai	
Ōita-2nd	Kentarō Ayabe	Rikken Seiyūkai	
Miyazaki	Iwao Itō	Rikken Seiyūkai	
Miyazaki	Torao Miura	Tōhōkai	
Miyazaki	Shigetaka Sogi	First Dietmen Club	
Miyazaki	Kentarō Suzuki	Rikken Minseitō	
Miyazaki	Gunkichi Jin	First Dietmen Club	
Kagoshima-1st	Tomoharu Inoue	Rikken Seiyūkai	
Kagoshima-1st	Jun'ya Koizumi	Rikken Minseitō	
Kagoshima-1st	Kōjirō Matsukata	Second Waiting Room	
Kagoshima-1st	Naotake Tsuzaki	First Dietmen Club	
Kagoshima-1st	Sanshirō Kurasono	First Dietmen Club	
Kagoshima-2nd	Eiji Tomiyoshi	Shakai Taishūtō	
Kagoshima-2nd	Minoru Tōgō	Rikken Seiyūkai	
Kagoshima-2nd	Ichimasa Terada	Rikken Seiyūkai	
Kagoshima-2nd	Eijirō Iwamoto	Rikken Seiyūkai	
Kagoshima-3rd	Ryōkichi Nagata	Rikken Seiyūkai	
Kagoshima-3rd	Masao Kanai	First Dietmen Club	
Kagoshima-3rd	Saburō Kobayashi	Rikken Minseitō	
Okinawa	Kenwa Kanna	Rikken Minseitō	
Okinawa	Hajime Irei	First Dietmen Club	
Okinawa	Sōichi Nakaima	Rikken Minseitō	
Okinawa	Shichō Sakiyama	Rikken Seiyūkai	
Okinawa	Meichō Morishima	Rikken Seiyūkai	

The composition as of 8 September 1937, the final day of this session, was the same as the first day.

=== 73rd Imperial Diet ===
Composition of the House of Representatives of Japan (as of December 26, 1937, first day of the 73rd Imperial Diet) (elected in 1937; term: 30 April 1937 – 25 March 1942)
Parliamentary groups/caucuses	Parties	Seats
Rikken Minseitō	Rikken Minseitō	177
Rikken Seiyūkai	Rikken Seiyūkai	173
First Dietmen Club; Daiichi Giin Club	Kokumin Dōmei (11); Japan Renovation Party (4); Kōdōkai (1); Independents (33)	49
Shakai Taishūtō	Shakai Taishūtō	35
Second Waiting Room; Daini Hikaeshitsu	Shinano Veterans Brotherhood (1); Rikken Yōseikai (1); Meirinkai (1); Independents (10)	13
Tōhōkai	Tōhōkai	11
Independents (not member of a caucus); Mushozoku	Independents (not member of a party); Speaker (Rikken Minseitō); Deputy Speaker (Rikken Seiyūkai)	4
Vacancies	-	4
Total		466

Detailed composition
Constituency	Members	Parliamentary Group	Notes
Hokkaido-1st	Kōzō Yamamoto	Rikken Minseitō	
Hokkaido-1st	Junsuke Itaya	Rikken Seiyūkai	
Hokkaido-1st	Rikichi Sawada	Rikken Minseitō	
Hokkaido-1st	Nakajirō Ichiyanagi	Rikken Minseitō	
Hokkaido-2nd	Takeshi Azuma	Rikken Seiyūkai	
Hokkaido-2nd	Roichi Hayashi	First Dietmen Club	
Hokkaido-2nd	Kōtarō Bandō	Rikken Minseitō	
Hokkaido-2nd	Shūtarō Matsuura	Rikken Minseitō	
Hokkaido-3rd	Torakichi Ōshima	Rikken Minseitō	
Hokkaido-3rd	Yasukuni Watanabe	Tōhōkai	
Hokkaido-3rd	Shōji Tashiro	Rikken Seiyūkai	
Hokkaido-4th	Katsumaro Akamatsu	First Dietmen Club	
Hokkaido-4th	Ryūkichi Teshirogi	Rikken Minseitō	
Hokkaido-4th	Katsutarō Kita	First Dietmen Club	
Hokkaido-4th	Vacant	-	
Hokkaido-4th	Tokuo Nanjō	Rikken Seiyūkai	
Hokkaido-5th	Fusakichi Tōyama	Rikken Minseitō	
Hokkaido-5th	Shigetarō Kinoshita	Rikken Seiyūkai	
Hokkaido-5th	Tei Tōjō	Rikken Seiyūkai	
Hokkaido-5th	Seisaku Nagumo	Rikken Minseitō	
Aomori-1st	Yasomi Ogasawara	Rikken Seiyūkai	
Aomori-1st	Tetsuo Kudō	Rikken Minseitō	
Aomori-1st	Jūjirō Morita	Rikken Minseitō	
Aomori-2nd	Ken'ichi Ono	Tōhōkai	
Aomori-2nd	Tosao Kudō	Rikken Seiyūkai	
Aomori-2nd	Ryūichi Kikuchi	Rikken Minseitō	
Iwate-1st	Ichimin Tago	Rikken Seiyūkai	
Iwate-1st	Jutarō Takahashi	Rikken Minseitō	
Iwate-1st	Saburō Yasumi	Rikken Seiyūkai	
Iwate-2nd	Kunisaburō Izumi	Rikken Seiyūkai	
Iwate-2nd	Shōzō Matsukawa	Rikken Seiyūkai	
Iwate-2nd	Yūsuke Tsurumi	Rikken Minseitō	
Iwate-2nd	Watari Shiga	Rikken Seiyūkai	
Miyagi-1st	Sakusaburō Uchigasaki	Rikken Minseitō	
Miyagi-1st	Yōnosuke Kikuchi	Shakai Taishūtō	
Miyagi-1st	Ichirō Shōji	Rikken Seiyūkai	
Miyagi-1st	Eifu Moriya	First Dietmen Club	
Miyagi-1st	Seisaku Miyazawa	Rikken Seiyūkai	
Miyagi-2nd	Hisayoshi Muramatsu	Rikken Minseitō	
Miyagi-2nd	Kuranosuke Oyama	Rikken Minseitō	
Miyagi-2nd	Rinji Ōishi	Rikken Seiyūkai	
Akita-1st	Chūji Machida	Rikken Minseitō	
Akita-1st	Giemon Shida	Rikken Minseitō	
Akita-1st	Gichoku Nakata	Rikken Seiyūkai	
Akita-1st	Shigeharu Nakagawa	Rikken Minseitō	
Akita-2nd	Seion Kawamata	Shakai Taishūtō	
Akita-2nd	Yoshitaka Oyamada	Rikken Seiyūkai	
Akita-2nd	Sōsuke Tsuchida	Rikken Minseitō	
Yamagata-1st	Takeo Kimura	Tōhōkai	
Yamagata-1st	Kumajirō Takahashi	Rikken Seiyūkai	
Yamagata-1st	Toshima Nishikata	Rikken Seiyūkai	
Yamagata-1st	Hiraku Satō	First Dietmen Club	
Yamagata-2nd	Toshizō Matsuoka	Rikken Seiyūkai	
Yamagata-2nd	Naota Kumagai	Rikken Seiyūkai	
Yamagata-2nd	Gorō Itō	Rikken Minseitō	
Yamagata-2nd	Tokutarō Shizumi	Rikken Minseitō	
Fukushima-1st	Hiroshi Momiyama	Rikken Minseitō	
Fukushima-1st	Morio Kugimoto	Rikken Minseitō	
Fukushima-1st	Zen'emon Kanno	Rikken Seiyūkai	
Fukushima-2nd	Sōkichi Hatta	Rikken Seiyūkai	
Fukushima-2nd	Saburō Nakanishi	Rikken Minseitō	
Fukushima-2nd	Keishirō Sukekawa	Rikken Seiyūkai	
Fukushima-2nd	Torakichi Nakano	First Dietmen Club	
Fukushima-2nd	Heima Hayashi	Rikken Minseitō	
Fukushima-3rd	Shōhei Hisa	Rikken Minseitō	
Fukushima-3rd	Hajime Hoshi	Rikken Seiyūkai	
Fukushima-3rd	Rokurō Yamada	Rikken Minseitō	
Ibaraki-1st	Nobuya Uchida	First Dietmen Club	
Ibaraki-1st	Toshihide Nakazaki	Rikken Minseitō	
Ibaraki-1st	Toyokichi Toyota	Rikken Minseitō	
Ibaraki-1st	Shingorō Hanashi	Rikken Seiyūkai	
Ibaraki-2nd	Hiroshi Nakaigawa	Rikken Minseitō	
Ibaraki-2nd	Minotarō Kawasaki	Rikken Seiyūkai	
Ibaraki-2nd	Takenosuke Ōuchi	Rikken Seiyūkai	
Ibaraki-3rd	Akira Kazami	Independent	
Ibaraki-3rd	Munenori Akagi	First Dietmen Club	
Ibaraki-3rd	Yōnosuke Satō	Rikken Seiyūkai	
Ibaraki-3rd	Gorō Iimura	First Dietmen Club	
Tochigi-1st	Naka Funada	Rikken Seiyūkai	
Tochigi-1st	Unpei Takada	Rikken Minseitō	
Tochigi-1st	Tokuya Tsuboyama	Rikken Seiyūkai	
Tochigi-1st	Saburō Ehara	Rikken Seiyūkai	
Tochigi-1st	Kikuji Okada	Rikken Minseitō	
Tochigi-2nd	Kunio Morishita	Rikken Minseitō	
Tochigi-2nd	Kōzō Matsumura	Rikken Seiyūkai	
Tochigi-2nd	Jūkichi Odaira	Rikken Seiyūkai	
Tochigi-2nd	Asashichi Kimura	Rikken Minseitō	
Gunma-1st	Chikuhei Nakajima	Rikken Seiyūkai	
Gunma-1st	Seiichi Aoki	First Dietmen Club	
Gunma-1st	Kō Sunaga	Shakai Taishūtō	
Gunma-1st	Harutarō Iizuka	Rikken Minseitō	
Gunma-1st	Tomesaburō Shizumi	Rikken Minseitō	
Gunma-2nd	Yoshimasa Shinohara	Rikken Seiyūkai	
Gunma-2nd	Masazō Mogami	Rikken Minseitō	
Gunma-2nd	Sanshirō Kogure	Rikken Seiyūkai	
Gunma-2nd	Budayū Kogure	Rikken Seiyūkai	
Saitama-1st	Tō Matsunaga	Rikken Minseitō	
Saitama-1st	Hajime Miyazaki	Rikken Seiyūkai	
Saitama-1st	Yasuo Takahashi	Rikken Seiyūkai	
Saitama-1st	Yoshio Matsunaga	Shakai Taishūtō	
Saitama-2nd	Morihei Takahashi	Rikken Minseitō	
Saitama-2nd	Jūji Yokokawa	Rikken Seiyūkai	
Saitama-2nd	Yōhei Ishizaka	Rikken Seiyūkai	
Saitama-2nd	Sōtarō Sakamoto	First Dietmen Club	
Saitama-3rd	Tetsuya Nonaka	First Dietmen Club	
Saitama-3rd	Hyōkichi Idei	Rikken Seiyūkai	
Saitama-3rd	Yoshihide Furushima	Rikken Minseitō	
Chiba-1st	Mitsunaga Tada	Rikken Minseitō	
Chiba-1st	Rokurō Shinohara	Rikken Minseitō	
Chiba-1st	Isamu Narushima	Rikken Minseitō	
Chiba-1st	Shōjirō Kawashima	Rikken Seiyūkai	
Chiba-2nd	Takehiko Imai	Rikken Seiyūkai	
Chiba-2nd	Shōryō Yoshiue	Rikken Seiyūkai	
Chiba-2nd	Shirō Uga	Rikken Minseitō	
Chiba-3rd	Akira Iwase	Rikken Seiyūkai	
Chiba-3rd	Chōsaburō Odaka	Rikken Seiyūkai	
Chiba-3rd	Seisaburō Tsuchiya	Rikken Minseitō	
Chiba-3rd	Seishū Ikeda	Rikken Minseitō	
Tokyo-1st	Mitsu Kōno	Shakai Taishūtō	
Tokyo-1st	Tamashige Hara	Rikken Minseitō	
Tokyo-1st	Yoshitsugu Takahashi	Rikken Minseitō	
Tokyo-1st	Seiichirō Dōke	Second Waiting Room	
Tokyo-1st	Yoshinari Honda	Rikken Seiyūkai	
Tokyo-2nd	Isoo Abe	Shakai Taishūtō	
Tokyo-2nd	Ichirō Hatoyama	Rikken Seiyūkai	
Tokyo-2nd	Yadanji Nakajima	Rikken Minseitō	
Tokyo-2nd	Jūji Komai	Rikken Minseitō	
Tokyo-2nd	Takaichi Nagano	Rikken Minseitō	
Tokyo-3rd	Keikichi Tanomogi	Rikken Minseitō	
Tokyo-3rd	Inejirō Asanuma	Shakai Taishūtō	
Tokyo-3rd	Daikichirō Tagawa	Second Waiting Room	
Tokyo-3rd	Masazumi Andō	Rikken Seiyūkai	
Tokyo-4th	Shigeo Abe	Shakai Taishūtō	
Tokyo-4th	Gijū Manabe	Rikken Minseitō	
Tokyo-4th	Shichirō Takizawa	Rikken Seiyūkai	
Tokyo-4th	Park Chun-geum	First Dietmen Club	
Tokyo-5th	Hisashi Asō	Shakai Taishūtō	
Tokyo-5th	Kanjū Katō	Second Waiting Room	
Tokyo-5th	Teikichi Shiba	Rikken Minseitō	
Tokyo-5th	Jusō Miwa	Shakai Taishūtō	
Tokyo-5th	Shizuo Makino	Rikken Seiyūkai	
Tokyo-6th	Bunji Suzuki	Shakai Taishūtō	
Tokyo-6th	Yonezō Maeda	Rikken Seiyūkai	
Tokyo-6th	Kiyoshi Yamada	Rikken Minseitō	
Tokyo-6th	Umekichi Nakamura	Rikken Minseitō	
Tokyo-6th	Gen Tanaka	Rikken Seiyūkai	
Tokyo-7th	Takeji Yatsunami	Rikken Minseitō	
Tokyo-7th	Takaichi Nakamura	Shakai Taishūtō	
Tokyo-7th	Kunitoshi Tsukumo	Rikken Seiyūkai	
Kanagawa-1st	Ken Okazaki	Shakai Taishūtō	
Kanagawa-1st	Sukeo Iida	Rikken Minseitō	
Kanagawa-1st	Jirō Nogata	Rikken Seiyūkai	
Kanagawa-2nd	Matajirō Koizumi	Rikken Minseitō	
Kanagawa-2nd	Tetsu Katayama	Shakai Taishūtō	
Kanagawa-2nd	Seiichi Ogushi	Rikken Seiyūkai	
Kanagawa-2nd	Kiichi Noguchi	Rikken Seiyūkai	
Kanagawa-3rd	Ichirō Kōno	Rikken Seiyūkai	
Kanagawa-3rd	Matsutarō Hirakawa	Rikken Minseitō	
Kanagawa-3rd	Hideo Suzuki	Rikken Seiyūkai	
Kanagawa-3rd	Kyūjirō Okazaki	Rikken Minseitō	
Niigata-1st	Reikichi Kita	Rikken Minseitō	
Niigata-1st	Vacant	-	
Niigata-1st	Gunji Matsui	Rikken Minseitō	
Niigata-2nd	Daisuke Takaoka	First Dietmen Club	
Niigata-2nd	Yoichi Satō	Rikken Minseitō	
Niigata-2nd	Hiromu Matsuki	Rikken Seiyūkai	
Niigata-2nd	Makie Koyanagi	Rikken Minseitō	
Niigata-3rd	Shōichi Miyake	Shakai Taishūtō	
Niigata-3rd	Kan'ichi Ōtake	First Dietmen Club	
Niigata-3rd	Chisei Katō	Rikken Seiyūkai	
Niigata-3rd	Tomenosuke Imanari	Rikken Minseitō	
Niigata-3rd	Kennosuke Satō	Rikken Minseitō	
Niigata-4th	Tokusaburō Takeda	Rikken Seiyūkai	
Niigata-4th	Giichi Masuda	Rikken Minseitō	
Niigata-4th	Naoji Kawai	Rikken Minseitō	
Toyama-1st	Yukimichi Takami	Rikken Seiyūkai	
Toyama-1st	Gonzō Terashima	Rikken Minseitō	
Toyama-1st	Karoku Nomura	Rikken Minseitō	
Toyama-2nd	Kitarō Uota	Rikken Minseitō	
Toyama-2nd	Kenzō Matsumura	Rikken Minseitō	
Toyama-2nd	Sōmei Tsuchikura	Rikken Seiyūkai	
Ishikawa-1st	Ryūtarō Nagai	Rikken Minseitō	
Ishikawa-1st	Chōji Hase	First Dietmen Club	
Ishikawa-1st	Takichi Hashimoto	Rikken Seiyūkai	
Ishikawa-2nd	Hyōgorō Sakurai	Rikken Minseitō	
Ishikawa-2nd	Kenzō Aoyama	Rikken Seiyūkai	
Ishikawa-2nd	Sōichirō Kita	Rikken Minseitō	
Fukui	Toshie Inoke	Rikken Seiyūkai	
Fukui	Keiichirō Soeda	Rikken Minseitō	
Fukui	Hichirōbei Ikeda	Rikken Seiyūkai	
Fukui	Naokitsu Saitō	Rikken Minseitō	
Fukui	Gouemon Kumagai	First Dietmen Club	
Yamanashi	Shichiroku Tanabe	Rikken Seiyūkai	
Yamanashi	Rikizō Hirano	First Dietmen Club	
Yamanashi	Jūji Kasai	First Dietmen Club	
Yamanashi	Ryōhei Horiuchi	Rikken Minseitō	
Yamanashi	Shinzō Imai	Second Waiting Room	
Nagano-1st	Tadao Matsumoto	Rikken Minseitō	
Nagano-1st	Bensaburō Maruyama	Rikken Seiyūkai	
Nagano-1st	Kuniji Tanaka	Rikken Minseitō	
Nagano-2nd	Kunitarō Oyama	Rikken Minseitō	
Nagano-2nd	Makoto Oyama	Second Waiting Room	
Nagano-2nd	Bushirō Hata	Rikken Seiyūkai	
Nagano-3rd	Taneo Miyazawa	Rikken Minseitō	
Nagano-3rd	Achinosuke Kitahara	Rikken Minseitō	
Nagano-3rd	Kinji Nakahara	Second Waiting Room	
Nagano-3rd	Masaru Nomizo	Shakai Taishūtō	
Nagano-4th	Etsujirō Uehara	Rikken Seiyūkai	
Nagano-4th	Wataru Momose	Rikken Minseitō	
Nagano-4th	Kō Tanaka	Second Waiting Room	
Gifu-1st	Kan Kiyoshi	Rikken Minseitō	
Gifu-1st	Eikichi Hikita	Rikken Seiyūkai	
Gifu-1st	Banboku Ōno	Rikken Seiyūkai	
Gifu-2nd	Sakujirō Kimura	Rikken Seiyūkai	
Gifu-2nd	Tōichirō Itō	Rikken Minseitō	
Gifu-2nd	Takeo Mitamura	Tōhōkai	
Gifu-3rd	Ryōzō Makino	Rikken Seiyūkai	
Gifu-3rd	Yoshitaka Furuya	Rikken Minseitō	
Gifu-3rd	Ryōzō Katō	Shakai Taishūtō	
Shizuoka-1st	Junsaku Yamada	Rikken Minseitō	
Shizuoka-1st	Toyotarō Fukazawa	Rikken Seiyūkai	
Shizuoka-1st	Chūgorō Yamaguchi	Rikken Seiyūkai	
Shizuoka-1st	Mitsuo Hirano	Rikken Minseitō	
Shizuoka-1st	Yūichirō Miyamoto	Rikken Seiyūkai	
Shizuoka-2nd	Kenji Yamazaki	Shakai Taishūtō	
Shizuoka-2nd	Shōzō Shiokawa	Rikken Seiyūkai	
Shizuoka-2nd	Kumetarō Takagi	Rikken Minseitō	
Shizuoka-2nd	Seishō Haruna	First Dietmen Club	
Shizuoka-3rd	Masataka Ōta	Rikken Seiyūkai	
Shizuoka-3rd	Kamesaku Tsukura	Rikken Minseitō	
Shizuoka-3rd	Yōichi Kuramoto	Rikken Seiyūkai	
Shizuoka-3rd	Sen'ichirō Sakashita	Rikken Minseitō	
Aichi-1st	Zō Tsukamoto	Rikken Minseitō	
Aichi-1st	Shōju Koyama	Independent	
Aichi-1st	Sakiichi Hattori	Rikken Minseitō	
Aichi-1st	Benkyō Shiio	Second Waiting Room	
Aichi-1st	Tsunekichi Yamazaki	First Dietmen Club	
Aichi-2nd	Kōzō Andō	First Dietmen Club	
Aichi-2nd	Zen'uemon Higuchi	Rikken Seiyūkai	
Aichi-2nd	Mojūrō Tange	Rikken Seiyūkai	
Aichi-3rd	Chōichi Katō	Rikken Minseitō	
Aichi-3rd	Morimasa Naitō	Rikken Minseitō	
Aichi-3rd	Tamasaburō Watanabe	Rikken Minseitō	
Aichi-4th	Ichizō Ōno	Rikken Minseitō	
Aichi-4th	Jitsutarō Okamoto	Rikken Minseitō	
Aichi-4th	Sankurō Ogasawara	Rikken Seiyūkai	
Aichi-5th	Shōgo Suzuki	First Dietmen Club	
Aichi-5th	Kiroku Ōguchi	Rikken Seiyūkai	
Aichi-5th	Takeo Sugiura	Tōhōkai	
Mie-1st	Kumeshirō Katō	Rikken Seiyūkai	
Mie-1st	Masakazu Matsuda	Rikken Minseitō	
Mie-1st	Tsunekazu Kataoka	Rikken Minseitō	
Mie-1st	Katsu Kawasaki	Rikken Minseitō	
Mie-1st	Jirō Umaoka	Rikken Seiyūkai	
Mie-2nd	Yukio Ozaki	Second Waiting Room	
Mie-2nd	Bunpei Hamachi	Rikken Seiyūkai	
Mie-2nd	Gen Nagai	Rikken Minseitō	
Mie-2nd	Kunimatsu Hamada	Rikken Seiyūkai	
Shiga	Yasujirō Tsutsumi	Rikken Minseitō	
Shiga	Ryōkan Aoki	Rikken Minseitō	
Shiga	Kōtarō Mori	Rikken Seiyūkai	
Shiga	Yōtatsu Tanaka	Tōhōkai	
Shiga	Iwakichi Hattori	Rikken Seiyūkai	
Kyoto-1st	Chōsaburō Mizutani	Shakai Taishūtō	
Kyoto-1st	Sannojō Nakamura	Rikken Minseitō	
Kyoto-1st	Sekijirō Fukuda	Rikken Minseitō	
Kyoto-1st	Kinzaburō Nishimura	Rikken Minseitō	
Kyoto-1st	Naozaburō Era	Rikken Seiyūkai	
Kyoto-2nd	Suegorō Kawasaki	Rikken Minseitō	
Kyoto-2nd	Jinshirō Ikemoto	Rikken Minseitō	
Kyoto-2nd	Kō Tanaka	Rikken Seiyūkai	
Kyoto-3rd	Hitoshi Ashida	Rikken Seiyūkai	
Kyoto-3rd	Takeshi Tsuhara	Rikken Minseitō	
Kyoto-3rd	Kunikichi Murakami	Rikken Minseitō	
Osaka-1st	Kiyoomi Taman	Shakai Taishūtō	
Osaka-1st	Tomozō Itano	Rikken Seiyūkai	
Osaka-1st	Sadayoshi Hitotsumatsu	Rikken Minseitō	
Osaka-2nd	Shinkurō Murayasu	Rikken Minseitō	
Osaka-2nd	Yoshiji Yamamoto	Rikken Seiyūkai	
Osaka-2nd	Ryōji Inoue	Shakai Taishūtō	
Osaka-3rd	Jūzō Tsukamoto	Shakai Taishūtō	
Osaka-3rd	Tadayoshi Ikezaki	Second Waiting Room	
Osaka-3rd	Masatake Naitō	Rikken Minseitō	
Osaka-3rd	Kōkichi Ueda	Rikken Seiyūkai	
Osaka-4th	Yasutarō Kawamura	Shakai Taishūtō	
Osaka-4th	Suehiro Nishio	Shakai Taishūtō	
Osaka-4th	Fukuzō Nakayama	Rikken Minseitō	
Osaka-4th	Yaichirō Honda	Rikken Minseitō	
Osaka-5th	Motojirō Sugiyama	Shakai Taishūtō	
Osaka-5th	Eikichi Katsuta	Rikken Minseitō	
Osaka-5th	Man'itsu Tanaka	Rikken Minseitō	
Osaka-5th	Giichi Sowa	Rikken Seiyūkai	
Osaka-6th	Toyomitsu Isaka	First Dietmen Club	
Osaka-6th	Takechiyo Matsuda	Rikken Minseitō	
Osaka-6th	Teizō Minami	Rikken Seiyūkai	
Hyōgo-1st	Jōtarō Kawakami	Shakai Taishūtō	
Hyōgo-1st	Kazuo Nakai	Rikken Seiyūkai	
Hyōgo-1st	Kazuo Nagae	Shakai Taishūtō	
Hyōgo-1st	Bun'ichirō Noda	Rikken Minseitō	
Hyōgo-1st	Tetsutarō Hamano	Rikken Minseitō	
Hyōgo-2nd	Fusanosuke Maeda	Rikken Minseitō	
Hyōgo-2nd	Mitsusuke Yonekubo	Shakai Taishūtō	
Hyōgo-2nd	Fusanosuke Kobayashi	Rikken Minseitō	
Hyōgo-2nd	Osamu Tatsukawa	Rikken Seiyūkai	
Hyōgo-3rd	Kinuji Kobayashi	Rikken Seiyūkai	
Hyōgo-3rd	Giichi Kawai	Shakai Taishūtō	
Hyōgo-3rd	Gensaburō Tanaka	Rikken Seiyūkai	
Hyōgo-4th	Ichirō Kiyose	First Dietmen Club	
Hyōgo-4th	Takeo Tanaka	Rikken Minseitō	
Hyōgo-4th	Sōbee Hara	Rikken Seiyūkai	
Hyōgo-4th	Toranosuke Kobata	Rikken Minseitō	
Hyōgo-5th	Takao Saitō	Rikken Minseitō	
Hyōgo-5th	Sadao Wakamiya	Rikken Seiyūkai	
Hyōgo-5th	Yorisaburō Yamakawa	Rikken Seiyūkai	
Nara	Genkurō Etō	First Dietmen Club	
Nara	Jinzō Fukui	Rikken Seiyūkai	
Nara	Eizō Mori	Rikken Seiyūkai	
Nara	Shirō Matsuo	Rikken Minseitō	
Nara	Itsurō Yagi	Rikken Minseitō	
Wakayama-1st	Tsunejirō Matsuyama	Rikken Seiyūkai	
Wakayama-1st	Shūichirō Kimoto	Rikken Seiyūkai	
Wakayama-1st	Ikuhei Nishida	Rikken Minseitō	
Wakayama-2nd	Tanizō Koyama	Rikken Minseitō	
Wakayama-2nd	Toyokichi Tabuchi	Second Waiting Room	
Wakayama-2nd	Kōichi Sekō	Rikken Seiyūkai	
Tottori	Naomichi Inada	Rikken Seiyūkai	
Tottori	Vacant	-	
Tottori	Hideyuki Miyoshi	Rikken Minseitō	
Tottori	Osamu Toyoda	First Dietmen Club	
Shimane-1st	Yukio Sakurauchi	Rikken Minseitō	
Shimane-1st	Fujirō Hara	Rikken Minseitō	
Shimane-1st	Enzaburō Takahashi	Rikken Seiyūkai	
Shimane-2nd	Toshio Shimada	Rikken Seiyūkai	
Shimane-2nd	Magoichi Tawara	Rikken Minseitō	
Shimane-2nd	Kamazō Okishima	Rikken Seiyūkai	
Okayama-1st	Tomoyuki Kuyama	Rikken Seiyūkai	
Okayama-1st	Tadahiko Okada	Rikken Seiyūkai	
Okayama-1st	Kakuji Yukiyoshi	Rikken Seiyūkai	
Okayama-1st	Hisao Kuroda	Independent	
Okayama-1st	Tomoyoshi Tamano	First Dietmen Club	
Okayama-2nd	Gōtarō Ogawa	Rikken Minseitō	
Okayama-2nd	Vacant	-	
Okayama-2nd	Takeru Inukai	Rikken Seiyūkai	
Okayama-2nd	Nirō Hoshishima	Rikken Seiyūkai	
Okayama-2nd	Setsuo Kotani	Rikken Seiyūkai	
Hiroshima-1st	Masaki Kishida	First Dietmen Club	
Hiroshima-1st	Kisanda Furuta	Rikken Minseitō	
Hiroshima-1st	Kan'ichi Nagawa	Rikken Seiyūkai	
Hiroshima-1st	Wakami Fujita	Rikken Minseitō	
Hiroshima-2nd	Shichirō Kihara	Rikken Minseitō	
Hiroshima-2nd	Keisuke Mochizuki	First Dietmen Club	
Hiroshima-2nd	Jōichi Yamaji	Rikken Minseitō	
Hiroshima-2nd	Takuji Hida	Rikken Seiyūkai	
Hiroshima-3rd	Tadanori Nagayama	First Dietmen Club	
Hiroshima-3rd	Yutaka Tsuchiya	Rikken Minseitō	
Hiroshima-3rd	Takatarō Sakuta	Rikken Minseitō	
Hiroshima-3rd	Yutaka Miyazawa	Rikken Seiyūkai	
Hiroshima-3rd	Fukuichi Morita	Rikken Seiyūkai	
Yamaguchi-1st	Sadaichi Nishikawa	Rikken Seiyūkai	
Yamaguchi-1st	Sakuo Aoki	Tōhōkai	
Yamaguchi-1st	Shintarō Shō	Rikken Seiyūkai	
Yamaguchi-1st	Kan Abe	First Dietmen Club	
Yamaguchi-2nd	Shigeo Nishimura	Rikken Seiyūkai	
Yamaguchi-2nd	Yoshimichi Kuboi	First Dietmen Club	
Yamaguchi-2nd	Gorō Kunimitsu	Rikken Seiyūkai	
Yamaguchi-2nd	Yasuo Fukuda	Rikken Minseitō	
Yamaguchi-2nd	Jisuke Nakano	Rikken Seiyūkai	
Tokushima-1st	Wahei Ikuta	Rikken Seiyūkai	
Tokushima-1st	Hidekichi Tamura	Rikken Minseitō	
Tokushima-1st	Akira Kōro	Rikken Seiyūkai	
Tokushima-2nd	Katsu Manabe	Rikken Minseitō	
Tokushima-2nd	Kiyoshi Akita	First Dietmen Club	
Tokushima-2nd	Takeo Miki	Second Waiting Room	
Kagawa-1st	Shōichi Maekawa	Shakai Taishūtō	
Kagawa-1st	Sutesuke Fujimoto	First Dietmen Club	
Kagawa-1st	Chōkichi Miyawaki	Rikken Seiyūkai	
Kagawa-2nd	Chūzō Mitsuchi	Rikken Seiyūkai	
Kagawa-2nd	Shōtarō Yano	Rikken Minseitō	
Kagawa-2nd	Ihei Matsuura	Rikken Seiyūkai	
Ehime-1st	Yūki Takechi	Rikken Minseitō	
Ehime-1st	Kisaburō Matsuda	Rikken Minseitō	
Ehime-1st	Sadatarō Ōmoto	Rikken Seiyūkai	
Ehime-2nd	Tetsuta Kawakami	Rikken Seiyūkai	
Ehime-2nd	Torakichi Ono	Rikken Minseitō	
Ehime-2nd	Takeo Murase	Rikken Minseitō	
Ehime-3rd	Shigemasa Sunada	Rikken Seiyūkai	
Ehime-3rd	Kametarō Takabatake	Rikken Seiyūkai	
Ehime-3rd	Monshirō Murakami	Rikken Minseitō	
Kōchi-1st	Masaru Ōishi	Tōhōkai	
Kōchi-1st	Kōjirō Tomita	Rikken Minseitō	
Kōchi-1st	Nagahiro Nagano	Rikken Minseitō	
Kōchi-2nd	Haruki Satake	Shakai Taishūtō	
Kōchi-2nd	Yoshiaki Yorimitsu	Rikken Seiyūkai	
Kōchi-2nd	Jōji Hayashi	Rikken Seiyūkai	
Fukuoka-1st	Seigō Nakano	Tōhōkai	
Fukuoka-1st	Jiichirō Matsumoto	Shakai Taishūtō	
Fukuoka-1st	Tsuneo Kangyū	First Dietmen Club	
Fukuoka-1st	Hatsutarō Haraguchi	Rikken Seiyūkai	
Fukuoka-2nd	Kan'ichirō Kamei	Shakai Taishūtō	
Fukuoka-2nd	Seigo Tajiri	Rikken Seiyūkai	
Fukuoka-2nd	Tokuji Ishii	Rikken Seiyūkai	
Fukuoka-2nd	Katsutarō Tajima	Rikken Minseitō	
Fukuoka-2nd	Sanzō Matsuo	Rikken Minseitō	
Fukuoka-3rd	Shunsaku Noda	Rikken Seiyūkai	
Fukuoka-3rd	Tatsunosuke Yamazaki	First Dietmen Club	
Fukuoka-3rd	Sōichi Tsuru	Rikken Seiyūkai	
Fukuoka-3rd	Gen'ya Masunaga	Rikken Seiyūkai	
Fukuoka-3rd	Ryūichi Okano	Rikken Minseitō	
Fukuoka-4th	Masanori Katsu	Rikken Minseitō	
Fukuoka-4th	Kaiichirō Suematsu	Rikken Minseitō	
Fukuoka-4th	Haruji Tahara	Shakai Taishūtō	
Fukuoka-4th	Shirō Koike	First Dietmen Club	
Saga-1st	Hideo Ikeda	Rikken Minseitō	
Saga-1st	Hōichi Nakano	Rikken Minseitō	
Saga-1st	Ryōichi Tanaka	Rikken Seiyūkai	
Saga-2nd	Yasutarō Fujio	Rikken Seiyūkai	
Saga-2nd	Toshitami Ichinose	Rikken Seiyūkai	
Saga-2nd	Tokiichirō Aino	Rikken Minseitō	
Nagasaki-1st	Motoharu Baba	Tōhōkai	
Nagasaki-1st	Takejirō Nishioka	Rikken Seiyūkai	
Nagasaki-1st	Shōhachirō Kuranari	Rikken Seiyūkai	
Nagasaki-1st	Fujio Nakamura	Rikken Minseitō	
Nagasaki-1st	Riichi Ōta	Rikken Seiyūkai	
Nagasaki-2nd	Kōzō Makiyama	Rikken Minseitō	
Nagasaki-2nd	Hajime Mori	First Dietmen Club	
Nagasaki-2nd	Takashi Kawasoe	Rikken Minseitō	
Nagasaki-2nd	Hitsuo Saho	Rikken Seiyūkai	
Kumamoto-1st	Kenzō Adachi	First Dietmen Club	
Kumamoto-1st	Tsuruhei Matsuno	Rikken Seiyūkai	
Kumamoto-1st	Masayoshi Kimura	Rikken Seiyūkai	
Kumamoto-1st	Shigeru Ishizaka	First Dietmen Club	
Kumamoto-1st	Tadao Ōasa	Rikken Minseitō	
Kumamoto-2nd	Tomito Izu	First Dietmen Club	
Kumamoto-2nd	Nobufusa Miyoshi	Rikken Seiyūkai	
Kumamoto-2nd	Michio Sakata	Rikken Seiyūkai	
Kumamoto-2nd	Nasogorō Komiyama	Rikken Seiyūkai	
Kumamoto-2nd	Toshikatsu Kurahara	First Dietmen Club	
Ōita-1st	Tsuneo Kanemitsu	Independent	
Ōita-1st	Fusajirō Ichinomiya	Rikken Minseitō	
Ōita-1st	Tsunayoshi Nagano	Rikken Minseitō	
Ōita-1st	Sunao Ono	Rikken Seiyūkai	
Ōita-2nd	Jūji Shigematsu	Rikken Minseitō	
Ōita-2nd	Kikuo Kiyose	Rikken Seiyūkai	
Ōita-2nd	Kentarō Ayabe	Rikken Seiyūkai	
Miyazaki	Iwao Itō	Rikken Seiyūkai	
Miyazaki	Torao Miura	Tōhōkai	
Miyazaki	Shigetaka Sogi	First Dietmen Club	
Miyazaki	Kentarō Suzuki	Rikken Minseitō	
Miyazaki	Gunkichi Jin	First Dietmen Club	
Kagoshima-1st	Tomoharu Inoue	Rikken Seiyūkai	
Kagoshima-1st	Jun'ya Koizumi	Rikken Minseitō	
Kagoshima-1st	Kōjirō Matsukata	Second Waiting Room	
Kagoshima-1st	Naotake Tsuzaki	First Dietmen Club	
Kagoshima-1st	Sanshirō Kurasono	First Dietmen Club	
Kagoshima-2nd	Eiji Tomiyoshi	Shakai Taishūtō	
Kagoshima-2nd	Minoru Tōgō	Rikken Seiyūkai	
Kagoshima-2nd	Ichimasa Terada	Rikken Seiyūkai	
Kagoshima-2nd	Eijirō Iwamoto	Rikken Seiyūkai	
Kagoshima-3rd	Ryōkichi Nagata	Rikken Seiyūkai	
Kagoshima-3rd	Masao Kanai	First Dietmen Club	
Kagoshima-3rd	Saburō Kobayashi	Rikken Minseitō	
Okinawa	Kenwa Kanna	Rikken Minseitō	
Okinawa	Hajime Irei	First Dietmen Club	
Okinawa	Sōichi Nakaima	Rikken Minseitō	
Okinawa	Shichō Sakiyama	Rikken Seiyūkai	
Okinawa	Meichō Morishima	Rikken Seiyūkai	

Composition of the House of Representatives of Japan (as of March 26, 1938, final day of the 73rd Imperial Diet) (elected in 1937; term: 30 April 1937 – 25 March 1942)
Parliamentary groups/caucuses	Parties	Seats
Rikken Minseitō	Rikken Minseitō	179
Rikken Seiyūkai	Rikken Seiyūkai	173
First Dietmen Club; Daiichi Giin Club	Kokumin Dōmei (10); Japan Renovation Party (4); Kōdōkai (1); Independents (32)	47
Shakai Taishūtō	Shakai Taishūtō	34
Second Waiting Room; Daini Hikaeshitsu	Shinano Veterans Brotherhood (1); Rikken Yōseikai (1); Meirinkai (1); Independents (10)	13
Tōhōkai	Tōhōkai	12
Independents (not member of a caucus); Mushozoku	Independents (not member of a party); Speaker (Rikken Minseitō); Deputy Speaker (Rikken Seiyūkai)	7
Vacancies	-	1
Total		466

Detailed composition
Constituency	Members	Parliamentary Group	Notes
Hokkaido-1st	Kōzō Yamamoto	Rikken Minseitō	
Hokkaido-1st	Junsuke Itaya	Rikken Seiyūkai	
Hokkaido-1st	Rikichi Sawada	Rikken Minseitō	
Hokkaido-1st	Nakajirō Ichiyanagi	Rikken Minseitō	
Hokkaido-2nd	Takeshi Azuma	Rikken Seiyūkai	
Hokkaido-2nd	Roichi Hayashi	First Dietmen Club	
Hokkaido-2nd	Kōtarō Bandō	Rikken Minseitō	
Hokkaido-2nd	Shūtarō Matsuura	Rikken Minseitō	
Hokkaido-3rd	Torakichi Ōshima	Rikken Minseitō	
Hokkaido-3rd	Yasukuni Watanabe	Tōhōkai	
Hokkaido-3rd	Shōji Tashiro	Rikken Seiyūkai	
Hokkaido-4th	Katsumaro Akamatsu	First Dietmen Club	
Hokkaido-4th	Ryūkichi Teshirogi	Rikken Minseitō	
Hokkaido-4th	Katsutarō Kita	First Dietmen Club	
Hokkaido-4th	Takayuki Matsuo	Rikken Seiyūkai	
Hokkaido-4th	Kichihei Fukasawa	Rikken Minseitō	
Hokkaido-5th	Fusakichi Tōyama	Rikken Minseitō	
Hokkaido-5th	Shigetarō Kinoshita	Rikken Seiyūkai	
Hokkaido-5th	Tei Tōjō	Rikken Seiyūkai	
Hokkaido-5th	Seisaku Nagumo	Rikken Minseitō	
Aomori-1st	Yasomi Ogasawara	Rikken Seiyūkai	
Aomori-1st	Tetsuo Kudō	Rikken Minseitō	
Aomori-1st	Jūjirō Morita	Rikken Minseitō	
Aomori-2nd	Ken'ichi Ono	Tōhōkai	
Aomori-2nd	Tosao Kudō	Rikken Seiyūkai	
Aomori-2nd	Ryūichi Kikuchi	Rikken Minseitō	
Iwate-1st	Ichimin Tago	Rikken Seiyūkai	
Iwate-1st	Jutarō Takahashi	Rikken Minseitō	
Iwate-1st	Saburō Yasumi	Rikken Seiyūkai	
Iwate-2nd	Kunisaburō Izumi	Rikken Seiyūkai	
Iwate-2nd	Shōzō Matsukawa	Rikken Seiyūkai	
Iwate-2nd	Yūsuke Tsurumi	Rikken Minseitō	
Iwate-2nd	Watari Shiga	Rikken Seiyūkai	
Miyagi-1st	Sakusaburō Uchigasaki	Rikken Minseitō	
Miyagi-1st	Yōnosuke Kikuchi	Shakai Taishūtō	
Miyagi-1st	Ichirō Shōji	Rikken Seiyūkai	
Miyagi-1st	Eifu Moriya	First Dietmen Club	
Miyagi-1st	Seisaku Miyazawa	Rikken Seiyūkai	
Miyagi-2nd	Hisayoshi Muramatsu	Rikken Minseitō	
Miyagi-2nd	Kuranosuke Oyama	Rikken Minseitō	
Miyagi-2nd	Rinji Ōishi	Rikken Seiyūkai	
Akita-1st	Chūji Machida	Rikken Minseitō	
Akita-1st	Giemon Shida	Rikken Minseitō	
Akita-1st	Gichoku Nakata	Rikken Seiyūkai	
Akita-1st	Shigeharu Nakagawa	Rikken Minseitō	
Akita-2nd	Seion Kawamata	Shakai Taishūtō	
Akita-2nd	Yoshitaka Oyamada	Rikken Seiyūkai	
Akita-2nd	Sōsuke Tsuchida	Rikken Minseitō	
Yamagata-1st	Takeo Kimura	Tōhōkai	
Yamagata-1st	Kumajirō Takahashi	Rikken Seiyūkai	
Yamagata-1st	Toshima Nishikata	Independent	
Yamagata-1st	Hiraku Satō	First Dietmen Club	
Yamagata-2nd	Toshizō Matsuoka	Rikken Seiyūkai	
Yamagata-2nd	Naota Kumagai	Rikken Seiyūkai	
Yamagata-2nd	Gorō Itō	Rikken Minseitō	
Yamagata-2nd	Tokutarō Shizumi	Rikken Minseitō	
Fukushima-1st	Hiroshi Momiyama	Rikken Minseitō	
Fukushima-1st	Morio Kugimoto	Rikken Minseitō	
Fukushima-1st	Zenbee Horikiri	Rikken Seiyūkai	
Fukushima-2nd	Suematsu Minato	Rikken Minseitō	
Fukushima-2nd	Saburō Nakanishi	Rikken Minseitō	
Fukushima-2nd	Keishirō Sukekawa	Rikken Seiyūkai	
Fukushima-2nd	Torakichi Nakano	First Dietmen Club	
Fukushima-2nd	Heima Hayashi	Rikken Minseitō	
Fukushima-3rd	Shōhei Hisa	Rikken Minseitō	
Fukushima-3rd	Hajime Hoshi	Rikken Seiyūkai	
Fukushima-3rd	Rokurō Yamada	Rikken Minseitō	
Ibaraki-1st	Nobuya Uchida	First Dietmen Club	
Ibaraki-1st	Toshihide Nakazaki	Rikken Minseitō	
Ibaraki-1st	Toyokichi Toyota	Rikken Minseitō	
Ibaraki-1st	Shingorō Hanashi	Rikken Seiyūkai	
Ibaraki-2nd	Hiroshi Nakaigawa	Rikken Minseitō	
Ibaraki-2nd	Minotarō Kawasaki	Rikken Seiyūkai	
Ibaraki-2nd	Takenosuke Ōuchi	Rikken Seiyūkai	
Ibaraki-3rd	Akira Kazami	Independent	
Ibaraki-3rd	Kumekichi Yamamoto	Rikken Minseitō	
Ibaraki-3rd	Yōnosuke Satō	Rikken Seiyūkai	
Ibaraki-3rd	Gorō Iimura	First Dietmen Club	
Tochigi-1st	Naka Funada	Rikken Seiyūkai	
Tochigi-1st	Unpei Takada	Rikken Minseitō	
Tochigi-1st	Tokuya Tsuboyama	Rikken Seiyūkai	
Tochigi-1st	Saburō Ehara	Rikken Seiyūkai	
Tochigi-1st	Kikuji Okada	Rikken Minseitō	
Tochigi-2nd	Kunio Morishita	Rikken Minseitō	
Tochigi-2nd	Kōzō Matsumura	Rikken Seiyūkai	
Tochigi-2nd	Jūkichi Odaira	Rikken Seiyūkai	
Tochigi-2nd	Asashichi Kimura	Rikken Minseitō	
Gunma-1st	Chikuhei Nakajima	Rikken Seiyūkai	
Gunma-1st	Seiichi Aoki	First Dietmen Club	
Gunma-1st	Kō Sunaga	Shakai Taishūtō	
Gunma-1st	Masao Kanazawa	Rikken Seiyūkai	
Gunma-1st	Tomesaburō Shizumi	Rikken Minseitō	
Gunma-2nd	Yoshimasa Shinohara	Rikken Seiyūkai	
Gunma-2nd	Masazō Mogami	Rikken Minseitō	
Gunma-2nd	Sanshirō Kogure	Rikken Seiyūkai	
Gunma-2nd	Budayū Kogure	Rikken Seiyūkai	
Saitama-1st	Tō Matsunaga	Rikken Minseitō	
Saitama-1st	Hajime Miyazaki	Rikken Seiyūkai	
Saitama-1st	Yasuo Takahashi	Rikken Seiyūkai	
Saitama-1st	Yoshio Matsunaga	Shakai Taishūtō	
Saitama-2nd	Morihei Takahashi	Rikken Minseitō	
Saitama-2nd	Jūji Yokokawa	Rikken Seiyūkai	
Saitama-2nd	Yōhei Ishizaka	Rikken Seiyūkai	
Saitama-2nd	Sōtarō Sakamoto	First Dietmen Club	
Saitama-3rd	Tetsuya Nonaka	First Dietmen Club	
Saitama-3rd	Hyōkichi Idei	Rikken Seiyūkai	
Saitama-3rd	Yoshihide Furushima	Rikken Minseitō	
Chiba-1st	Mitsunaga Tada	Rikken Minseitō	
Chiba-1st	Rokurō Shinohara	Rikken Minseitō	
Chiba-1st	Isamu Narushima	Rikken Minseitō	
Chiba-1st	Shōjirō Kawashima	Rikken Seiyūkai	
Chiba-2nd	Takehiko Imai	Rikken Seiyūkai	
Chiba-2nd	Shōryō Yoshiue	Rikken Seiyūkai	
Chiba-2nd	Shirō Uga	Rikken Minseitō	
Chiba-3rd	Akira Iwase	Rikken Seiyūkai	
Chiba-3rd	Chōsaburō Odaka	Rikken Seiyūkai	
Chiba-3rd	Seisaburō Tsuchiya	Rikken Minseitō	
Chiba-3rd	Seishū Ikeda	Rikken Minseitō	
Tokyo-1st	Mitsu Kōno	Shakai Taishūtō	
Tokyo-1st	Tamashige Hara	Rikken Minseitō	
Tokyo-1st	Yoshitsugu Takahashi	Rikken Minseitō	
Tokyo-1st	Seiichirō Dōke	Second Waiting Room	
Tokyo-1st	Yoshinari Honda	Rikken Seiyūkai	
Tokyo-2nd	Isoo Abe	Shakai Taishūtō	
Tokyo-2nd	Ichirō Hatoyama	Rikken Seiyūkai	
Tokyo-2nd	Yadanji Nakajima	Rikken Minseitō	
Tokyo-2nd	Jūji Komai	Rikken Minseitō	
Tokyo-2nd	Takaichi Nagano	Rikken Minseitō	
Tokyo-3rd	Keikichi Tanomogi	Rikken Minseitō	
Tokyo-3rd	Inejirō Asanuma	Shakai Taishūtō	
Tokyo-3rd	Daikichirō Tagawa	Second Waiting Room	
Tokyo-3rd	Masazumi Andō	Rikken Seiyūkai	
Tokyo-4th	Shigeo Abe	Shakai Taishūtō	
Tokyo-4th	Gijū Manabe	Rikken Minseitō	
Tokyo-4th	Shichirō Takizawa	Rikken Seiyūkai	
Tokyo-4th	Park Chun-geum	First Dietmen Club	
Tokyo-5th	Hisashi Asō	Shakai Taishūtō	
Tokyo-5th	Kanjū Katō	Second Waiting Room	
Tokyo-5th	Teikichi Shiba	Rikken Minseitō	
Tokyo-5th	Jusō Miwa	Shakai Taishūtō	
Tokyo-5th	Shizuo Makino	Rikken Seiyūkai	
Tokyo-6th	Bunji Suzuki	Shakai Taishūtō	
Tokyo-6th	Yonezō Maeda	Rikken Seiyūkai	
Tokyo-6th	Kiyoshi Yamada	Rikken Minseitō	
Tokyo-6th	Umekichi Nakamura	Rikken Minseitō	
Tokyo-6th	Gen Tanaka	Rikken Seiyūkai	
Tokyo-7th	Takeji Yatsunami	Rikken Minseitō	
Tokyo-7th	Takaichi Nakamura	Shakai Taishūtō	
Tokyo-7th	Kunitoshi Tsukumo	Independent	
Kanagawa-1st	Ken Okazaki	Shakai Taishūtō	
Kanagawa-1st	Sukeo Iida	Rikken Minseitō	
Kanagawa-1st	Jirō Nogata	Rikken Seiyūkai	
Kanagawa-2nd	Matajirō Koizumi	Rikken Minseitō	
Kanagawa-2nd	Tetsu Katayama	Shakai Taishūtō	
Kanagawa-2nd	Seiichi Ogushi	Rikken Seiyūkai	
Kanagawa-2nd	Kiichi Noguchi	Rikken Seiyūkai	
Kanagawa-3rd	Ichirō Kōno	Rikken Seiyūkai	
Kanagawa-3rd	Matsutarō Hirakawa	Rikken Minseitō	
Kanagawa-3rd	Hideo Suzuki	Rikken Seiyūkai	
Kanagawa-3rd	Kyūjirō Okazaki	Rikken Minseitō	
Niigata-1st	Reikichi Kita	Rikken Minseitō	
Niigata-1st	Vacant	-	
Niigata-1st	Gunji Matsui	Rikken Minseitō	
Niigata-2nd	Daisuke Takaoka	First Dietmen Club	
Niigata-2nd	Yoichi Satō	Rikken Minseitō	
Niigata-2nd	Hiromu Matsuki	Rikken Seiyūkai	
Niigata-2nd	Makie Koyanagi	Rikken Minseitō	
Niigata-3rd	Shōichi Miyake	Shakai Taishūtō	
Niigata-3rd	Kōnen Fujii	Rikken Seiyūkai	
Niigata-3rd	Chisei Katō	Rikken Seiyūkai	
Niigata-3rd	Tomenosuke Imanari	Rikken Minseitō	
Niigata-3rd	Kennosuke Satō	Rikken Minseitō	
Niigata-4th	Tokusaburō Takeda	Rikken Seiyūkai	
Niigata-4th	Giichi Masuda	Rikken Minseitō	
Niigata-4th	Naoji Kawai	Rikken Minseitō	
Toyama-1st	Yukimichi Takami	Rikken Seiyūkai	
Toyama-1st	Gonzō Terashima	Rikken Minseitō	
Toyama-1st	Karoku Nomura	Rikken Minseitō	
Toyama-2nd	Kitarō Uota	Rikken Minseitō	
Toyama-2nd	Kenzō Matsumura	Rikken Minseitō	
Toyama-2nd	Sōmei Tsuchikura	Rikken Seiyūkai	
Ishikawa-1st	Ryūtarō Nagai	Rikken Minseitō	
Ishikawa-1st	Chōji Hase	First Dietmen Club	
Ishikawa-1st	Takichi Hashimoto	Rikken Seiyūkai	
Ishikawa-2nd	Hyōgorō Sakurai	Rikken Minseitō	
Ishikawa-2nd	Kenzō Aoyama	Rikken Seiyūkai	
Ishikawa-2nd	Sōichirō Kita	Rikken Minseitō	
Fukui	Toshie Inoke	Rikken Seiyūkai	
Fukui	Keiichirō Soeda	Rikken Minseitō	
Fukui	Hichirōbei Ikeda	Rikken Seiyūkai	
Fukui	Naokitsu Saitō	Rikken Minseitō	
Fukui	Gouemon Kumagai	First Dietmen Club	
Yamanashi	Shichiroku Tanabe	Rikken Seiyūkai	
Yamanashi	Rikizō Hirano	First Dietmen Club	
Yamanashi	Jūji Kasai	First Dietmen Club	
Yamanashi	Ryōhei Horiuchi	Rikken Minseitō	
Yamanashi	Shinzō Imai	Second Waiting Room	
Nagano-1st	Tadao Matsumoto	Rikken Minseitō	
Nagano-1st	Bensaburō Maruyama	Rikken Seiyūkai	
Nagano-1st	Kuniji Tanaka	Rikken Minseitō	
Nagano-2nd	Kunitarō Oyama	Rikken Minseitō	
Nagano-2nd	Makoto Oyama	Second Waiting Room	
Nagano-2nd	Bushirō Hata	Rikken Seiyūkai	
Nagano-3rd	Taneo Miyazawa	Rikken Minseitō	
Nagano-3rd	Achinosuke Kitahara	Rikken Minseitō	
Nagano-3rd	Kinji Nakahara	Second Waiting Room	
Nagano-3rd	Masaru Nomizo	Shakai Taishūtō	
Nagano-4th	Etsujirō Uehara	Rikken Seiyūkai	
Nagano-4th	Wataru Momose	Rikken Minseitō	
Nagano-4th	Kō Tanaka	Second Waiting Room	
Gifu-1st	Kan Kiyoshi	Rikken Minseitō	
Gifu-1st	Eikichi Hikita	Rikken Seiyūkai	
Gifu-1st	Banboku Ōno	Rikken Seiyūkai	
Gifu-2nd	Sakujirō Kimura	Rikken Seiyūkai	
Gifu-2nd	Tōichirō Itō	Rikken Minseitō	
Gifu-2nd	Takeo Mitamura	Tōhōkai	
Gifu-3rd	Ryōzō Makino	Rikken Seiyūkai	
Gifu-3rd	Yoshitaka Furuya	Rikken Minseitō	
Gifu-3rd	Ryōzō Katō	Shakai Taishūtō	
Shizuoka-1st	Junsaku Yamada	Rikken Minseitō	
Shizuoka-1st	Toyotarō Fukazawa	Rikken Seiyūkai	
Shizuoka-1st	Chūgorō Yamaguchi	Rikken Seiyūkai	
Shizuoka-1st	Mitsuo Hirano	Rikken Minseitō	
Shizuoka-1st	Yūichirō Miyamoto	Rikken Seiyūkai	
Shizuoka-2nd	Kenji Yamazaki	Shakai Taishūtō	
Shizuoka-2nd	Shōzō Shiokawa	Rikken Seiyūkai	
Shizuoka-2nd	Kumetarō Takagi	Rikken Minseitō	
Shizuoka-2nd	Seishō Haruna	First Dietmen Club	
Shizuoka-3rd	Masataka Ōta	Rikken Seiyūkai	
Shizuoka-3rd	Kamesaku Tsukura	Rikken Minseitō	
Shizuoka-3rd	Yōichi Kuramoto	Rikken Seiyūkai	
Shizuoka-3rd	Sen'ichirō Sakashita	Rikken Minseitō	
Aichi-1st	Zō Tsukamoto	Rikken Minseitō	
Aichi-1st	Shōju Koyama	Independent	
Aichi-1st	Sakiichi Hattori	Rikken Minseitō	
Aichi-1st	Benkyō Shiio	Second Waiting Room	
Aichi-1st	Tsunekichi Yamazaki	First Dietmen Club	
Aichi-2nd	Kōzō Andō	First Dietmen Club	
Aichi-2nd	Zen'uemon Higuchi	Rikken Seiyūkai	
Aichi-2nd	Eimei Hattori	Rikken Minseitō	
Aichi-3rd	Chōichi Katō	Rikken Minseitō	
Aichi-3rd	Morimasa Naitō	Rikken Minseitō	
Aichi-3rd	Tamasaburō Watanabe	Rikken Minseitō	
Aichi-4th	Ichizō Ōno	Rikken Minseitō	
Aichi-4th	Jitsutarō Okamoto	Rikken Minseitō	
Aichi-4th	Sankurō Ogasawara	Rikken Seiyūkai	
Aichi-5th	Shōgo Suzuki	First Dietmen Club	
Aichi-5th	Kiroku Ōguchi	Rikken Seiyūkai	
Aichi-5th	Takeo Sugiura	Tōhōkai	
Mie-1st	Kumeshirō Katō	Rikken Seiyūkai	
Mie-1st	Masakazu Matsuda	Rikken Minseitō	
Mie-1st	Tsunekazu Kataoka	Rikken Minseitō	
Mie-1st	Katsu Kawasaki	Rikken Minseitō	
Mie-1st	Jirō Umaoka	Rikken Seiyūkai	
Mie-2nd	Yukio Ozaki	Second Waiting Room	
Mie-2nd	Bunpei Hamachi	Rikken Seiyūkai	
Mie-2nd	Gen Nagai	Rikken Minseitō	
Mie-2nd	Kunimatsu Hamada	Rikken Seiyūkai	
Shiga	Yasujirō Tsutsumi	Rikken Minseitō	
Shiga	Ryōkan Aoki	Rikken Minseitō	
Shiga	Kōtarō Mori	Rikken Seiyūkai	
Shiga	Yōtatsu Tanaka	Tōhōkai	
Shiga	Iwakichi Hattori	Rikken Seiyūkai	
Kyoto-1st	Chōsaburō Mizutani	Shakai Taishūtō	
Kyoto-1st	Sannojō Nakamura	Rikken Minseitō	
Kyoto-1st	Sekijirō Fukuda	Rikken Minseitō	
Kyoto-1st	Kinzaburō Nishimura	Rikken Minseitō	
Kyoto-1st	Naozaburō Era	Rikken Seiyūkai	
Kyoto-2nd	Suegorō Kawasaki	Rikken Minseitō	
Kyoto-2nd	Jinshirō Ikemoto	Rikken Minseitō	
Kyoto-2nd	Kō Tanaka	Rikken Seiyūkai	
Kyoto-3rd	Hitoshi Ashida	Rikken Seiyūkai	
Kyoto-3rd	Takeshi Tsuhara	Rikken Minseitō	
Kyoto-3rd	Kunikichi Murakami	Rikken Minseitō	
Osaka-1st	Kiyoomi Taman	Shakai Taishūtō	
Osaka-1st	Tomozō Itano	Rikken Seiyūkai	
Osaka-1st	Sadayoshi Hitotsumatsu	Rikken Minseitō	
Osaka-2nd	Shinkurō Murayasu	Rikken Minseitō	
Osaka-2nd	Yoshiji Yamamoto	Rikken Seiyūkai	
Osaka-2nd	Ryōji Inoue	Shakai Taishūtō	
Osaka-3rd	Jūzō Tsukamoto	Shakai Taishūtō	
Osaka-3rd	Tadayoshi Ikezaki	Second Waiting Room	
Osaka-3rd	Masatake Naitō	Rikken Minseitō	
Osaka-3rd	Kōkichi Ueda	Rikken Seiyūkai	
Osaka-4th	Yasutarō Kawamura	Shakai Taishūtō	
Osaka-4th	Masayoshi Morita	Rikken Seiyūkai	
Osaka-4th	Fukuzō Nakayama	Rikken Minseitō	
Osaka-4th	Yaichirō Honda	Rikken Minseitō	
Osaka-5th	Motojirō Sugiyama	Shakai Taishūtō	
Osaka-5th	Eikichi Katsuta	Rikken Minseitō	
Osaka-5th	Man'itsu Tanaka	Rikken Minseitō	
Osaka-5th	Giichi Sowa	Rikken Seiyūkai	
Osaka-6th	Toyomitsu Isaka	First Dietmen Club	
Osaka-6th	Takechiyo Matsuda	Rikken Minseitō	
Osaka-6th	Teizō Minami	Rikken Seiyūkai	
Hyōgo-1st	Jōtarō Kawakami	Shakai Taishūtō	
Hyōgo-1st	Kazuo Nakai	Rikken Seiyūkai	
Hyōgo-1st	Kazuo Nagae	Shakai Taishūtō	
Hyōgo-1st	Bun'ichirō Noda	Rikken Minseitō	
Hyōgo-1st	Tetsutarō Hamano	Rikken Minseitō	
Hyōgo-2nd	Fusanosuke Maeda	Rikken Minseitō	
Hyōgo-2nd	Mitsusuke Yonekubo	Shakai Taishūtō	
Hyōgo-2nd	Fusanosuke Kobayashi	Rikken Minseitō	
Hyōgo-2nd	Osamu Tatsukawa	Rikken Seiyūkai	
Hyōgo-3rd	Kinuji Kobayashi	Rikken Seiyūkai	
Hyōgo-3rd	Giichi Kawai	Shakai Taishūtō	
Hyōgo-3rd	Gensaburō Tanaka	Rikken Seiyūkai	
Hyōgo-4th	Ichirō Kiyose	First Dietmen Club	
Hyōgo-4th	Takeo Tanaka	Rikken Minseitō	
Hyōgo-4th	Sōbee Hara	Rikken Seiyūkai	
Hyōgo-4th	Toranosuke Kobata	Rikken Minseitō	
Hyōgo-5th	Takao Saitō	Rikken Minseitō	
Hyōgo-5th	Sadao Wakamiya	Rikken Seiyūkai	
Hyōgo-5th	Yorisaburō Yamakawa	Rikken Seiyūkai	
Nara	Genkurō Etō	First Dietmen Club	
Nara	Jinzō Fukui	Rikken Seiyūkai	
Nara	Eizō Mori	Rikken Seiyūkai	
Nara	Shirō Matsuo	Rikken Minseitō	
Nara	Itsurō Yagi	Rikken Minseitō	
Wakayama-1st	Tsunejirō Matsuyama	Rikken Seiyūkai	
Wakayama-1st	Shūichirō Kimoto	Rikken Seiyūkai	
Wakayama-1st	Ikuhei Nishida	Rikken Minseitō	
Wakayama-2nd	Tanizō Koyama	Rikken Minseitō	
Wakayama-2nd	Toyokichi Tabuchi	Second Waiting Room	
Wakayama-2nd	Kōichi Sekō	Rikken Seiyūkai	
Tottori	Naomichi Inada	Rikken Seiyūkai	
Tottori	Yoshiharu Yutani	Tōhōkai	
Tottori	Hideyuki Miyoshi	Rikken Minseitō	
Tottori	Osamu Toyoda	First Dietmen Club	
Shimane-1st	Yukio Sakurauchi	Rikken Minseitō	
Shimane-1st	Fujirō Hara	Rikken Minseitō	
Shimane-1st	Enzaburō Takahashi	Rikken Seiyūkai	
Shimane-2nd	Toshio Shimada	Rikken Seiyūkai	
Shimane-2nd	Magoichi Tawara	Rikken Minseitō	
Shimane-2nd	Kamazō Okishima	Rikken Seiyūkai	
Okayama-1st	Tomoyuki Kuyama	Rikken Seiyūkai	
Okayama-1st	Tadahiko Okada	Rikken Seiyūkai	
Okayama-1st	Kakuji Yukiyoshi	Rikken Seiyūkai	
Okayama-1st	Hisao Kuroda	Independent	
Okayama-1st	Tomoyoshi Tamano	First Dietmen Club	
Okayama-2nd	Gōtarō Ogawa	Rikken Minseitō	
Okayama-2nd	Shikaji Shigei	Independent	
Okayama-2nd	Takeru Inukai	Rikken Seiyūkai	
Okayama-2nd	Nirō Hoshishima	Rikken Seiyūkai	
Okayama-2nd	Setsuo Kotani	Rikken Seiyūkai	
Hiroshima-1st	Masaki Kishida	First Dietmen Club	
Hiroshima-1st	Kisanda Furuta	Rikken Minseitō	
Hiroshima-1st	Kan'ichi Nagawa	Rikken Seiyūkai	
Hiroshima-1st	Wakami Fujita	Rikken Minseitō	
Hiroshima-2nd	Shichirō Kihara	Rikken Minseitō	
Hiroshima-2nd	Keisuke Mochizuki	First Dietmen Club	
Hiroshima-2nd	Jōichi Yamaji	Rikken Minseitō	
Hiroshima-2nd	Takuji Hida	Rikken Seiyūkai	
Hiroshima-3rd	Tadanori Nagayama	First Dietmen Club	
Hiroshima-3rd	Yutaka Tsuchiya	Rikken Minseitō	
Hiroshima-3rd	Takatarō Sakuta	Rikken Minseitō	
Hiroshima-3rd	Yutaka Miyazawa	Rikken Seiyūkai	
Hiroshima-3rd	Fukuichi Morita	Rikken Seiyūkai	
Yamaguchi-1st	Sadaichi Nishikawa	Rikken Seiyūkai	
Yamaguchi-1st	Sakuo Aoki	Tōhōkai	
Yamaguchi-1st	Shintarō Shō	Rikken Seiyūkai	
Yamaguchi-1st	Kan Abe	First Dietmen Club	
Yamaguchi-2nd	Shigeo Nishimura	Rikken Seiyūkai	
Yamaguchi-2nd	Yoshimichi Kuboi	First Dietmen Club	
Yamaguchi-2nd	Gorō Kunimitsu	Rikken Seiyūkai	
Yamaguchi-2nd	Yasuo Fukuda	Rikken Minseitō	
Yamaguchi-2nd	Jisuke Nakano	Rikken Seiyūkai	
Tokushima-1st	Wahei Ikuta	Rikken Seiyūkai	
Tokushima-1st	Hidekichi Tamura	Rikken Minseitō	
Tokushima-1st	Akira Kōro	Rikken Seiyūkai	
Tokushima-2nd	Katsu Manabe	Rikken Minseitō	
Tokushima-2nd	Kiyoshi Akita	First Dietmen Club	
Tokushima-2nd	Takeo Miki	Second Waiting Room	
Kagawa-1st	Shōichi Maekawa	Shakai Taishūtō	
Kagawa-1st	Sutesuke Fujimoto	First Dietmen Club	
Kagawa-1st	Chōkichi Miyawaki	Rikken Seiyūkai	
Kagawa-2nd	Chūzō Mitsuchi	Rikken Seiyūkai	
Kagawa-2nd	Shōtarō Yano	Rikken Minseitō	
Kagawa-2nd	Ihei Matsuura	Rikken Seiyūkai	
Ehime-1st	Yūki Takechi	Rikken Minseitō	
Ehime-1st	Kisaburō Matsuda	Rikken Minseitō	
Ehime-1st	Sadatarō Ōmoto	Rikken Seiyūkai	
Ehime-2nd	Tetsuta Kawakami	Rikken Seiyūkai	
Ehime-2nd	Torakichi Ono	Rikken Minseitō	
Ehime-2nd	Takeo Murase	Rikken Minseitō	
Ehime-3rd	Shigemasa Sunada	Rikken Seiyūkai	
Ehime-3rd	Kametarō Takabatake	Rikken Seiyūkai	
Ehime-3rd	Monshirō Murakami	Rikken Minseitō	
Kōchi-1st	Masaru Ōishi	Tōhōkai	
Kōchi-1st	Shigei Asai	Rikken Seiyūkai	
Kōchi-1st	Nagahiro Nagano	Rikken Minseitō	
Kōchi-2nd	Haruki Satake	Shakai Taishūtō	
Kōchi-2nd	Yoshiaki Yorimitsu	Rikken Seiyūkai	
Kōchi-2nd	Jōji Hayashi	Rikken Seiyūkai	
Fukuoka-1st	Seigō Nakano	Tōhōkai	
Fukuoka-1st	Jiichirō Matsumoto	Shakai Taishūtō	
Fukuoka-1st	Tsuneo Kangyū	First Dietmen Club	
Fukuoka-1st	Hatsutarō Haraguchi	Rikken Seiyūkai	
Fukuoka-2nd	Kan'ichirō Kamei	Shakai Taishūtō	
Fukuoka-2nd	Seigo Tajiri	Rikken Seiyūkai	
Fukuoka-2nd	Tokuji Ishii	Rikken Seiyūkai	
Fukuoka-2nd	Katsutarō Tajima	Rikken Minseitō	
Fukuoka-2nd	Sanzō Matsuo	Rikken Minseitō	
Fukuoka-3rd	Shunsaku Noda	Rikken Seiyūkai	
Fukuoka-3rd	Tatsunosuke Yamazaki	First Dietmen Club	
Fukuoka-3rd	Sōichi Tsuru	Rikken Seiyūkai	
Fukuoka-3rd	Gen'ya Masunaga	Rikken Seiyūkai	
Fukuoka-3rd	Ryūichi Okano	Rikken Minseitō	
Fukuoka-4th	Masanori Katsu	Rikken Minseitō	
Fukuoka-4th	Kaiichirō Suematsu	Rikken Minseitō	
Fukuoka-4th	Haruji Tahara	Shakai Taishūtō	
Fukuoka-4th	Shirō Koike	First Dietmen Club	
Saga-1st	Hideo Ikeda	Rikken Minseitō	
Saga-1st	Hōichi Nakano	Rikken Minseitō	
Saga-1st	Ryōichi Tanaka	Rikken Seiyūkai	
Saga-2nd	Yasutarō Fujio	Rikken Seiyūkai	
Saga-2nd	Toshitami Ichinose	Rikken Seiyūkai	
Saga-2nd	Tokiichirō Aino	Rikken Minseitō	
Nagasaki-1st	Motoharu Baba	Tōhōkai	
Nagasaki-1st	Takejirō Nishioka	Rikken Seiyūkai	
Nagasaki-1st	Shōhachirō Kuranari	Rikken Seiyūkai	
Nagasaki-1st	Fujio Nakamura	Rikken Minseitō	
Nagasaki-1st	Riichi Ōta	Rikken Seiyūkai	
Nagasaki-2nd	Kōzō Makiyama	Rikken Minseitō	
Nagasaki-2nd	Hajime Mori	First Dietmen Club	
Nagasaki-2nd	Takashi Kawasoe	Rikken Minseitō	
Nagasaki-2nd	Hitsuo Saho	Rikken Seiyūkai	
Kumamoto-1st	Kenzō Adachi	First Dietmen Club	
Kumamoto-1st	Tsuruhei Matsuno	Rikken Seiyūkai	
Kumamoto-1st	Masayoshi Kimura	Rikken Seiyūkai	
Kumamoto-1st	Shigeru Ishizaka	First Dietmen Club	
Kumamoto-1st	Tadao Ōasa	Rikken Minseitō	
Kumamoto-2nd	Tomito Izu	First Dietmen Club	
Kumamoto-2nd	Nobufusa Miyoshi	Rikken Seiyūkai	
Kumamoto-2nd	Michio Sakata	Rikken Seiyūkai	
Kumamoto-2nd	Nasogorō Komiyama	Rikken Seiyūkai	
Kumamoto-2nd	Toshikatsu Kurahara	First Dietmen Club	
Ōita-1st	Tsuneo Kanemitsu	Independent	
Ōita-1st	Fusajirō Ichinomiya	Rikken Minseitō	
Ōita-1st	Tsunayoshi Nagano	Rikken Minseitō	
Ōita-1st	Sunao Ono	Rikken Seiyūkai	
Ōita-2nd	Jūji Shigematsu	Rikken Minseitō	
Ōita-2nd	Kikuo Kiyose	Rikken Seiyūkai	
Ōita-2nd	Kentarō Ayabe	Rikken Seiyūkai	
Miyazaki	Iwao Itō	Rikken Seiyūkai	
Miyazaki	Torao Miura	Tōhōkai	
Miyazaki	Shigetaka Sogi	First Dietmen Club	
Miyazaki	Kentarō Suzuki	Rikken Minseitō	
Miyazaki	Gunkichi Jin	First Dietmen Club	
Kagoshima-1st	Tomoharu Inoue	Rikken Seiyūkai	
Kagoshima-1st	Jun'ya Koizumi	Rikken Minseitō	
Kagoshima-1st	Kōjirō Matsukata	Second Waiting Room	
Kagoshima-1st	Naotake Tsuzaki	First Dietmen Club	
Kagoshima-1st	Sanshirō Kurasono	First Dietmen Club	
Kagoshima-2nd	Eiji Tomiyoshi	Shakai Taishūtō	
Kagoshima-2nd	Minoru Tōgō	Rikken Seiyūkai	
Kagoshima-2nd	Ichimasa Terada	Rikken Seiyūkai	
Kagoshima-2nd	Eijirō Iwamoto	Rikken Seiyūkai	
Kagoshima-3rd	Ryōkichi Nagata	Rikken Seiyūkai	
Kagoshima-3rd	Masao Kanai	First Dietmen Club	
Kagoshima-3rd	Saburō Kobayashi	Rikken Minseitō	
Okinawa	Kenwa Kanna	Rikken Minseitō	
Okinawa	Hajime Irei	First Dietmen Club	
Okinawa	Sōichi Nakaima	Rikken Minseitō	
Okinawa	Shichō Sakiyama	Rikken Seiyūkai	
Okinawa	Meichō Morishima	Rikken Seiyūkai	
