= Okada cabinet =

Cabinet of Japan (1934–1936)

Okada Cabinet
- 31st Cabinet of Japan

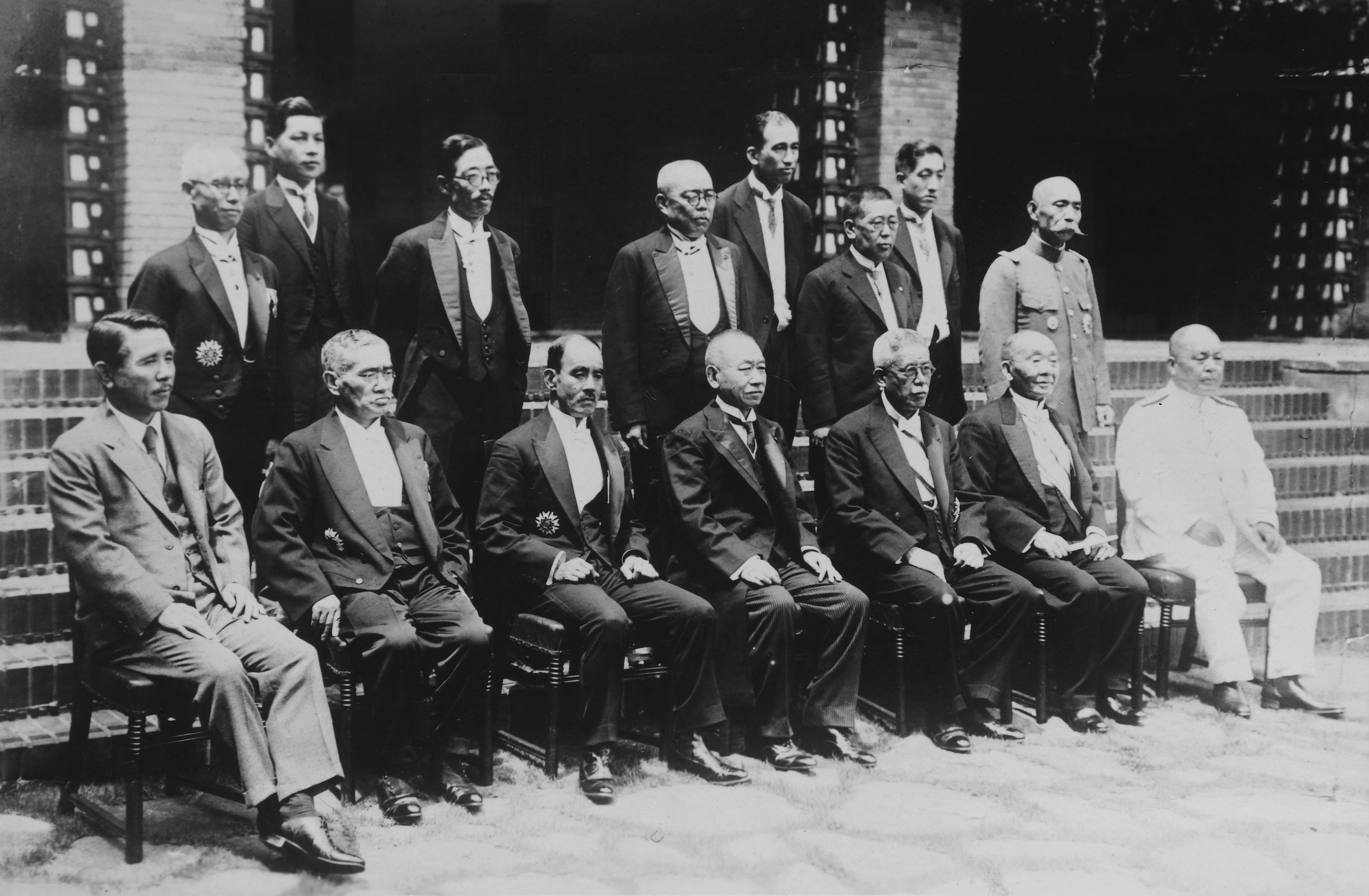
- Date formed: July 8, 1934
- Date dissolved: March 9, 1936

People and organisations
- Emperor: Shōwa
- Prime Minister: Okada Keisuke; Fumio Gotō (acting)
- Member party: HoR Blocs: Rikken Minseitō; Rikken Seiyūkai dissidents, later Shōwakai HoP Blocs: Kenkyūkai; Kōseikai
- Status in legislature: Majority (coalition)
- Opposition party: Rikken Seiyūkai
- Opposition leader: Suzuki Kisaburō

History
- Election: 1936 general election
- Legislature terms: 66th Imperial Diet; 67th Imperial Diet; 68th Imperial Diet
- Predecessor: Saitō Cabinet
- Successor: Hirota Cabinet

The Okada Cabinet (岡田内閣, Okada naikaku) is the 31st Cabinet of Japan under the leadership of Prime Minister Okada Keisuke from July 8, 1934, to March 9, 1936.

== Cabinet ==
Okada was appointed on July 8, 1934, after his predecessor Saitō Makoto had resigned over the Teijin Incident. Okada's appointment dashed hopes for a revival of political party influence. His cabinet was the second "national unity cabinet" (kyokoku itchi naikaku) after the Saitō Cabinet that had marked the end of the party rule of the 1920s and early 1930s, which was the so-called Taishō Democracy. Key ministers came from the bureaucracy and the military, and other posts were held by politicians mostly from the minority Minseitō and the Shōwakai, a militarist breakaway group from the majority Seiyūkai that had refused to let its members join the Okada Cabinet.

After the attempted coup d'état in the February 26 Incident in 1936, the Okada Cabinet resigned. Following Genrō Kinmochi Saionji's recommendation, the emperor appointed foreign minister Hirota Kōki as successor leading to the formation of the Hirota Cabinet, another "national unity cabinet".

Ministers
Portfolio	Name	Political party	Term start	Term end
Prime Minister	Okada Keisuke	Military (Navy)	July 8, 1934	March 9, 1936
Prime Minister	Fumio Gotō (acting)	Independent	February 26, 1936	February 29, 1936
Minister for Foreign Affairs	Kōki Hirota	Independent	July 8, 1934	March 9, 1936
Minister of Home Affairs	Fumio Gotō	Independent	July 8, 1934	March 9, 1936
Minister of Finance	Sadanobu Fujii	Independent	July 8, 1934	November 27, 1934
Minister of Finance	Korekiyo Takahashi	Independent (Seiyūkai Dissident)	November 27, 1934	February 26, 1936
Minister of Finance	Chuji Machida	Rikken Minseitō	February 26, 1936	March 9, 1936
Minister of the Army	Senjūrō Hayashi	Military (Army)	July 8, 1934	September 5, 1935
Minister of the Army	Yoshiyuki Kawashima	Military (Army)	September 5, 1935	March 9, 1936
Minister of the Navy	Mineo Ōsumi	Military (Navy)	July 8, 1934	March 9, 1936
Minister of Justice	Naoshi Ohara	Independent	July 8, 1934	March 9, 1936
Minister of Education	Genji Matsuda	Rikken Minseitō	July 8, 1934	February 1, 1936
Minister of Education	Takukichi Kawasaki	Rikken Minseitō	February 1, 1936	March 9, 1936
Minister of Agriculture, Forestry and Fisheries	Tatsunosuke Yamazaki	Shōwakai (Seiyūkai Dissident)	July 8, 1934	March 9, 1936
Minister of Commerce and Industry	Chuji Machida	Rikken Minseitō	July 8, 1934	March 9, 1936
Minister of Communications	Takejirō Tokonami	Independent (Seiyūkai Dissident)	July 8, 1934	September 8, 1935
Minister of Communications	Okada Keisuke	Military (Navy)	September 9, 1935	September 12, 1935
Minister of Communications	Keisuke Mochizuki	Shōwakai (Seiyūkai Dissident)	September 12, 1935	March 9, 1936
Minister of Railways	Nobuya Uchida	Shōwakai (Seiyūkai Dissident)	July 8, 1934	March 9, 1936
Minister of Colonial Affairs	Okada Keisuke	Military (Navy)	July 8, 1934	October 25, 1934
Minister of Colonial Affairs	Count Hideo Kodama	Kenkyūkai	October 25, 1934	March 9, 1936
Chief Cabinet Secretary	Isao Kawada	Independent	May 26, 1932	October 20, 1934
Chief Cabinet Secretary	Shigeru Yoshida	Independent	October 20, 1934	May 11, 1935
Chief Cabinet Secretary	Takekai Shirane	Independent	May 11, 1935	March 9, 1936
Director-General of the Cabinet Legislation Bureau	Teizō Kurosaki	Independent	July 8, 1934	July 10, 1934
Director-General of the Cabinet Legislation Bureau	Tokujiro Kanamori	Independent	July 10, 1934	January 11, 1936
Director-General of the Cabinet Legislation Bureau	Hachirō Ōhashi	Independent	January 11, 1936	March 9, 1936
Parliamentary Vice-Ministers
Portfolio	Name	Political party	Term start	Term end
Parliamentary Vice-Minister for Foreign Affairs	Isaka Toyomitsu	Independent	July 19, 1934	March 9, 1936
Parliamentary Vice-Minister of Home Affairs	Baron Ōmori Kaichi	Independent	July 19, 1934	March 9, 1936
Parliamentary Vice-Minister of Finance	Baron Yabuki Shōzō	Independent	July 19, 1934	March 9, 1936
Parliamentary Vice-Minister of the Army	Viscount Toki Akira	Kenkyūkai	July 19, 1934	December 14, 1935
Parliamentary Vice-Minister of the Army	Viscount Okabe Nagakage	Kenkyūkai	December 14, 1935	March 9, 1936
Parliamentary Vice-Minister of the Navy	Count Hotta Masatsune	Kenkyūkai	July 19, 1934	March 9, 1936
Parliamentary Vice-Minister of Justice	Hara Fujirō	Rikken Minseitō	July 19, 1934	March 9, 1936
Parliamentary Vice-Minister of Education	Soeda Keiichirō	Rikken Minseitō	July 19, 1934	March 9, 1936
Parliamentary Vice-Minister of Agriculture, Forestry and Fisheries	Moriya Eifu	Shōwakai	July 19, 1934	March 9, 1936
Parliamentary Vice-Minister of Commerce and Industry	Masanori Katsu	Rikken Minseitō	July 19, 1934	March 9, 1936
Parliamentary Vice-Minister of Communications	Aoki Seiichi	Shōwakai	July 19, 1934	March 9, 1936
Parliamentary Vice-Minister of Railways	Higutchi Noritsune	Independent	July 19, 1934	August 31, 1935
Parliamentary Vice-Minister of Railways	Kurasono Sanshirō	Shōwakai	August 31, 1935	March 9, 1936
Parliamentary Vice-Minister of Colonial Affairs	Tanaka Takeo	Rikken Minseitō	July 19, 1934	October 26, 1934
Parliamentary Vice-Minister of Colonial Affairs	Sakurai Hyōgorō	Rikken Minseitō	October 26, 1934	March 9, 1936
Parliamentary Undersecretaries
Portfolio	Name	Political party	Term start	Term end
Parliamentary Undersecretary for Foreign Affairs	Matsumoto Tadao	Rikken Minseitō	July 19, 1934	March 9, 1936
Parliamentary Undersecretary of Home Affairs	Count Hashimoto Saneaya	Kenkyūkai	July 19, 1934	March 9, 1936
Parliamentary Undersecretary of Finance	Toyoda Osamu	Shōwakai	July 19, 1934	March 9, 1936
Parliamentary Undersecretary of the Army	Ishii Saburō	Independent	July 19, 1934	March 9, 1936
Parliamentary Undersecretary of the Navy	Kuboi Yoshimichi	Shōwakai	July 19, 1934	March 9, 1936
Parliamentary Undersecretary of Justice	Viscount Funabashi Kiyokata	Kenkyūkai	July 19, 1934	March 9, 1936
Parliamentary Undersecretary of Education	Yamamasu Norishige	Rikken Minseitō	July 19, 1934	March 9, 1936
Parliamentary Undersecretary of Agriculture, Forestry and Fisheries	Mori Hajime	Shōwakai	July 19, 1934	March 9, 1936
Parliamentary Undersecretary of Commerce and Industry	Takahashi Morihei	Rikken Minseitō	July 19, 1934	March 9, 1936
Parliamentary Undersecretary of Communications	Hirano Mitsuo	Rikken Minseitō	July 19, 1934	March 9, 1936
Parliamentary Undersecretary of Railways	Kaneda Hideo	Shōwakai	July 19, 1934	March 9, 1936
Parliamentary Undersecretary of Colonial Affairs	Teshirogi Ryūkichi	Rikken Minseitō	July 19, 1934	October 26, 1934
Parliamentary Undersecretary of Colonial Affairs	Satō Masashi	Rikken Minseitō	October 26, 1934	March 9, 1936
