= Saitō cabinet =

Cabinet of Japan (1932–1934)

Saitō Cabinet
- 30th Cabinet of Japan

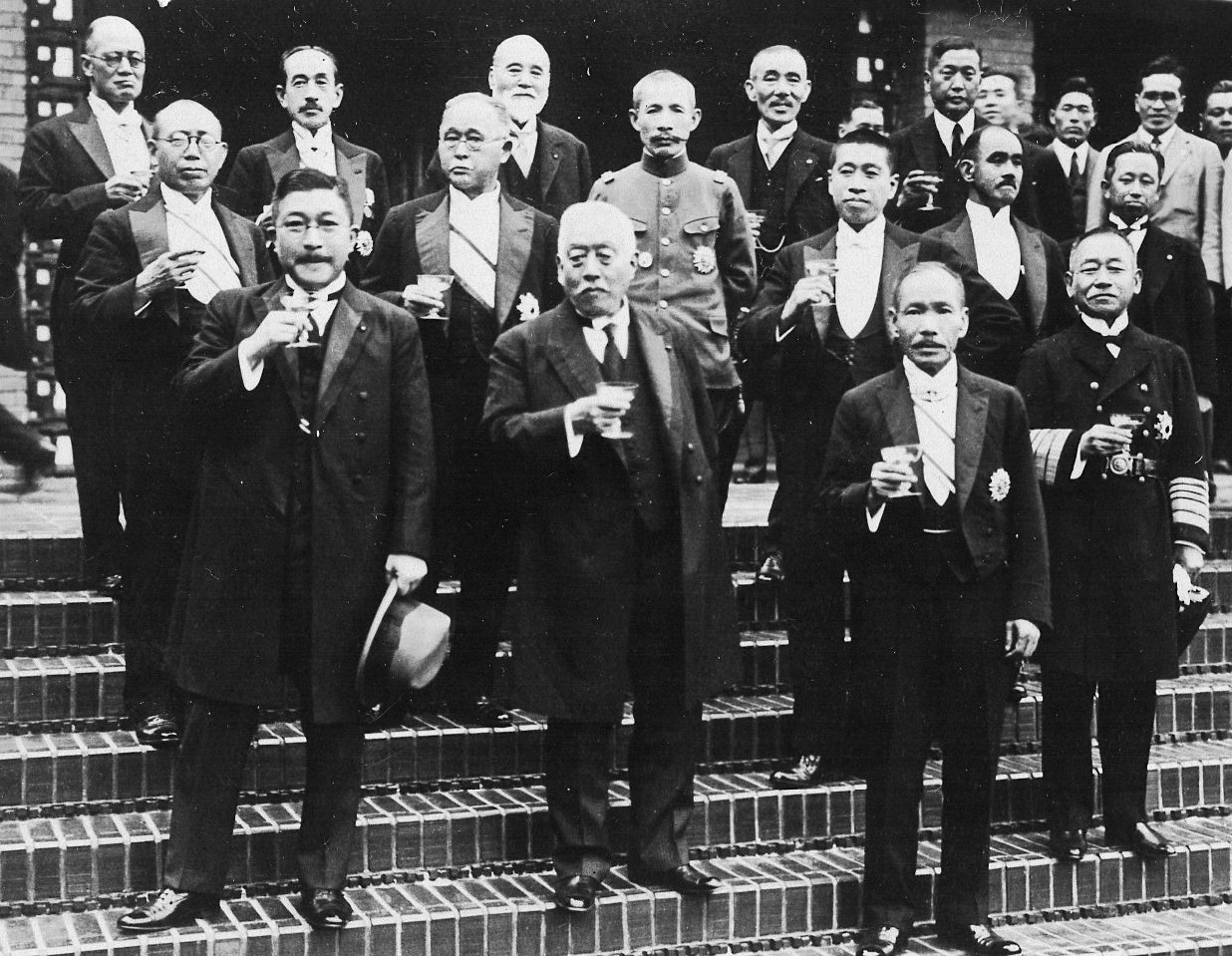
- Date formed: May 26, 1932
- Date dissolved: July 8, 1934

People and organisations
- Emperor: Shōwa
- Prime Minister: Saitō Makoto
- Member party: HoR Blocs: Rikken Minseitō; Rikken Seiyūkai; HoP Blocs: Kenkyūkai; Kōseikai; Kōuyu Club
- Status in legislature: Majority (coalition)

History
- Legislature terms: 62nd Imperial Diet; 63rd Imperial Diet; 64th Imperial Diet; 65th Imperial Diet
- Predecessor: Inukai Cabinet
- Successor: Okada Cabinet

The Saitō Cabinet is the 30th Cabinet of Japan led by Saitō Makoto from May 26, 1932, to July 8, 1934.

== Cabinet ==
Ministers
Portfolio	Name	Political party	Term start	Term end
Prime Minister	Viscount Saitō Makoto	Military (Navy)	May 26, 1932	July 8, 1934
Minister for Foreign Affairs	Viscount Saitō Makoto	Military (Navy)	May 26, 1932	July 6, 1932
Minister for Foreign Affairs	Count Uchida Kōsai	Independent	July 6, 1932	September 14, 1933
Minister for Foreign Affairs	Kōki Hirota	Independent	September 14, 1933	July 8, 1934
Minister of Home Affairs	Baron Yamamoto Tatsuo	Rikken Minseitō	May 26, 1932	July 8, 1934
Minister of Finance	Takahashi Korekiyo	Rikken Seiyūkai	May 26, 1932	July 8, 1934
Minister of the Army	Sadao Araki	Military (Army)	May 26, 1932	January 23, 1934
Minister of the Army	Senjūrō Hayashi	Military (Army)	January 23, 1934	July 8, 1934
Minister of the Navy	Keisuke Okada	Military (Navy)	May 26, 1932	June 9, 1933
Minister of the Navy	Mineo Ōsumi	Military (Navy)	June 9, 1933	January 23, 1934
Minister of Justice	Koyama Matsukichi	Independent	May 26, 1932	July 8, 1934
Minister of Education	Ichirō Hatoyama	Rikken Seiyūkai	May 26, 1932	March 3, 1934
Minister of Education	Viscount Saitō Makoto	Military (Navy)	March 3, 1934	July 8, 1934
Minister of Agriculture, Forestry and Fisheries	Fumio Gotō	Independent	May 26, 1932	July 8, 1934
Minister of Commerce and Industry	Baron Kumakichi Nakajima	Independent	May 26, 1932	February 9, 1934
Minister of Commerce and Industry	Jōji Matsumoto	Independent	February 9, 1934	July 8, 1934
Minister of Communications	Hiroshi Minami	Independent	May 26, 1932	July 8, 1934
Minister of Railways	Mitsuchi Chōzō	Rikken Seiyūkai	May 26, 1932	July 8, 1934
Minister of Colonial Affairs	Ryūtarō Nagai	Rikken Minseitō	May 26, 1932	July 8, 1934
Chief Cabinet Secretary	Shibata Zenzaburō	Independent	May 26, 1932	March 13, 1933
Chief Cabinet Secretary	Zenjirō Horikiri	Independent	March 13, 1933	July 8, 1934
Director-General of the Cabinet Legislation Bureau	Zenjirō Horikiri	Independent	May 26, 1932	March 13, 1933
Director-General of the Cabinet Legislation Bureau	Kurosaki Teizō	Independent	March 13, 1933	July 8, 1934
Parliamentary Vice-Ministers
Portfolio	Name	Political party	Term start	Term end
Parliamentary Vice-Minister for Foreign Affairs	Taki Masao	Independent	June 1, 1932	July 8, 1934
Parliamentary Vice-Minister of Home Affairs	Saitō Takao	Rikken Minseitō	June 1, 1932	July 8, 1934
Parliamentary Vice-Minister of Finance	Horikiri Zenbee	Rikken Seiyūkai	June 1, 1932	July 8, 1934
Parliamentary Vice-Minister of the Army	Viscount Toki Akira	Independent	June 1, 1932	July 8, 1934
Parliamentary Vice-Minister of the Navy	Count Hotta Masatsune	Independent	June 1, 1932	July 8, 1934
Parliamentary Vice-Minister of Justice	Yatsunami Takeji	Rikken Minseitō	June 1, 1932	July 8, 1934
Parliamentary Vice-Minister of Education	Tōgō Minoru	Rikken Seiyūkai	June 1, 1932	July 8, 1934
Parliamentary Vice-Minister of Agriculture, Forestry and Fisheries	Count Yoriyasu Arima	Independent	June 1, 1932	April 21, 1933
Parliamentary Vice-Minister of Agriculture, Forestry and Fisheries	Viscount Oda Nobutsune	Independent	April 21, 1933	July 8, 1934
Parliamentary Vice-Minister of Commerce and Industry	Iwakiri Shigeo	Rikken Minseitō	June 1, 1932	July 8, 1934
Parliamentary Vice-Minister of Communications	Shiga Watari	Rikken Seiyūkai	June 1, 1932	August 11, 1932
Parliamentary Vice-Minister of Communications	Makino Ryōzō	Rikken Seiyūkai	August 11, 1932	July 8, 1934
Parliamentary Vice-Minister of Railways	Nagawa Kanichi	Rikken Seiyūkai	June 1, 1932	July 8, 1934
Parliamentary Vice-Minister of Colonial Affairs	Tsutsumi Yasujirō	Rikken Minseitō	June 1, 1932	July 8, 1934
Parliamentary Undersecretaries
Portfolio	Name	Political party	Term start	Term end
Parliamentary Undersecretary for Foreign Affairs	Sawamoto Yoichi	Rikken Minseitō	June 1, 1932	June 21, 1933
Parliamentary Undersecretary for Foreign Affairs	Vacant		June 21, 1933	June 23, 1933
Parliamentary Undersecretary for Foreign Affairs	Nishiwaki Shin	Rikken Minseitō	June 23, 1933	December 19, 1933
Parliamentary Undersecretary for Foreign Affairs	Vacant		December 19, 1933	December 22, 1933
Parliamentary Undersecretary for Foreign Affairs	Matsumoto Tadao	Rikken Minseitō	December 22, 1933	July 8, 1934
Parliamentary Undersecretary of Home Affairs	Katsuta Eikichi	Rikken Minseitō	June 1, 1932	July 8, 1934
Parliamentary Undersecretary of Finance	Uetsuka Tsukasa	Rikken Seiyūkai	June 1, 1932	July 8, 1934
Parliamentary Undersecretary of the Army	Ishii Saburō	Independent	June 1, 1932	July 8, 1934
Parliamentary Undersecretary of the Navy	Kawashima Shōjirō	Rikken Seiyūkai	June 1, 1932	July 8, 1934
Parliamentary Undersecretary of Justice	Iwamoto Busuke	Rikken Seiyūkai	June 1, 1932	July 8, 1934
Parliamentary Undersecretary of Education	Ishizaka Toyokazu	Rikken Seiyūkai	June 1, 1932	July 8, 1934
Parliamentary Undersecretary of Agriculture, Forestry and Fisheries	Matsumura Kenzō	Rikken Minseitō	June 1, 1932	July 8, 1934
Parliamentary Undersecretary of Commerce and Industry	Matsumura Kōzō	Rikken Seiyūkai	June 1, 1932	July 8, 1934
Parliamentary Undersecretary of Communications	Viscount Tachibana Tanetada	Independent	June 1, 1932	July 8, 1934
Parliamentary Undersecretary of Railways	Itaya Junsuke	Rikken Seiyūkai	June 1, 1932	July 8, 1934
Parliamentary Undersecretary of Colonial Affairs	Kozaemon Kimura	Rikken Minseitō	June 1, 1932	July 8, 1934
