= Hirota cabinet =

Cabinet of Japan (1936–1937)

Hirota Cabinet
- 32nd Cabinet of Japan

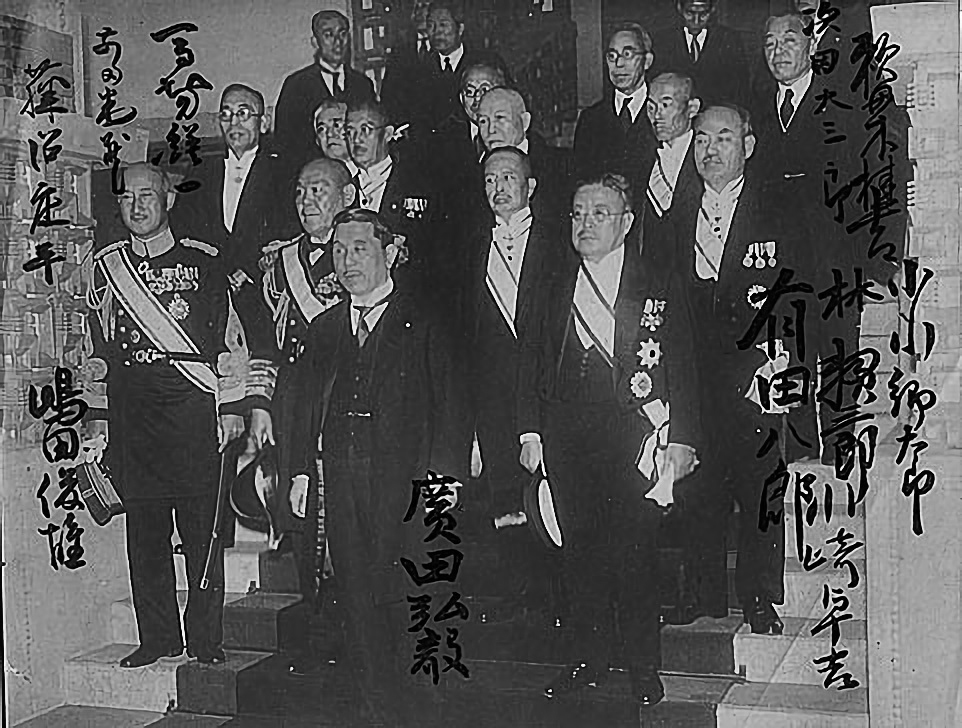
- Date formed: March 9, 1936
- Date dissolved: February 2, 1937

People and organisations
- Emperor: Shōwa
- Prime Minister: Kōki Hirota
- Status in legislature: Majority (coalition)

History
- Legislature terms: 69th Imperial Diet; 70th Imperial Diet
- Predecessor: Okada Cabinet
- Successor: Hayashi Cabinet

The Hirota Cabinet is the 32nd Cabinet of Japan led by Kōki Hirota from March 9, 1936, to February 2, 1937.

== Cabinet ==
Ministers
Portfolio	Name	Political party	Term start	Term end
Prime Minister	Kōki Hirota	Independent	March 9, 1936	February 2, 1937
Minister for Foreign Affairs	Kōki Hirota	Independent	March 9, 1936	April 2, 1936
Minister for Foreign Affairs	Hachirō Arita	Independent	April 2, 1936	February 2, 1937
Minister of Home Affairs	Shigenosuke Ushio	Independent	March 9, 1936	February 2, 1937
Minister of Finance	Eiichi Baba	Independent	March 9, 1936	February 2, 1937
Minister of the Army	Hisaichi Terauchi	Military (Army)	March 9, 1936	February 2, 1937
Minister of the Navy	Osami Nagano	Military (Navy)	March 9, 1936	February 2, 1937
Minister of Justice	Hayashi Raizaburō	Independent	March 9, 1936	February 2, 1937
Minister of Education	Shigenosuke Ushio	Independent	March 9, 1936	March 25, 1936
Minister of Education	Hirao Hachisaburō	Independent	March 25, 1936	February 2, 1937
Minister of Agriculture, Forestry and Fisheries	Toshio Shimada	Rikken Seiyūkai	March 9, 1936	February 2, 1937
Minister of Commerce and Industry	Kawasaki Takukichi	Independent	March 9, 1936	March 27, 1936
Minister of Commerce and Industry	Gōtarō Ogawa	Rikken Minseitō	March 27, 1936	February 2, 1937
Minister of Communications	Tanomogi Keikichi	Rikken Minseitō	March 9, 1936	February 2, 1937
Minister of Railways	Yonezō Maeda	Rikken Seiyūkai	March 9, 1936	February 2, 1937
Minister of Colonial Affairs	Hidejirō Nagata	Independent	March 9, 1936	February 2, 1937
Chief Cabinet Secretary	Fujinuma Shōhei	Independent	March 9, 1936	February 2, 1937
Director-General of the Cabinet Legislation Bureau	Tsugita Daizaburō	Independent	March 9, 1936	February 2, 1937
Parliamentary Vice-Ministers
Portfolio	Name	Political party	Term start	Term end
Parliamentary Vice-Minister for Foreign Affairs	Inoke Toshie	Rikken Seiyūkai	April 15, 1936	February 2, 1937
Parliamentary Vice-Minister of Home Affairs	Viscount Nabeshima Naotada	Independent	April 15, 1936	February 2, 1937
Parliamentary Vice-Minister of Finance	Nakajima Yadanji	Rikken Minseitō	April 15, 1936	February 2, 1937
Parliamentary Vice-Minister of the Army	Viscount Tatsumi Toyomaru	Independent	April 15, 1936	February 2, 1937
Parliamentary Vice-Minister of the Navy	Vacant		April 15, 1936	February 2, 1937
Parliamentary Vice-Minister of Justice	Noda Shunsaku	Rikken Seiyūkai	April 15, 1936	February 2, 1937
Parliamentary Vice-Minister of Education	Yamamoto Kōzō	Rikken Minseitō	April 15, 1936	February 2, 1937
Parliamentary Vice-Minister of Agriculture, Forestry and Fisheries	Tanabe Shichiroku	Rikken Seiyūkai	April 15, 1936	August 19, 1936
Parliamentary Vice-Minister of Agriculture, Forestry and Fisheries	Yamazaki Takeshi	Rikken Seiyūkai	August 19, 1936	February 2, 1937
Parliamentary Vice-Minister of Commerce and Industry	Ikeda Hideo	Rikken Minseitō	April 15, 1936	February 2, 1937
Parliamentary Vice-Minister of Communications	Maeda Fusanosuke	Rikken Minseitō	April 15, 1936	February 2, 1937
Parliamentary Vice-Minister of Railways	Tako Ichimin	Rikken Seiyūkai	April 15, 1936	February 2, 1937
Parliamentary Vice-Minister of Colonial Affairs	Baron Inada Masatane	Independent	April 15, 1936	February 2, 1937
Parliamentary Undersecretaries
Portfolio	Name	Political party	Term start	Term end
Parliamentary Undersecretary for Foreign Affairs	Matsuyama Tsunejirō	Rikken Seiyūkai	April 15, 1936	February 2, 1937
Parliamentary Undersecretary of Home Affairs	Baron Kimotsuki Kanefusa	Independent	April 15, 1936	February 2, 1937
Parliamentary Undersecretary of Finance	Tange Mojūrō	Rikken Seiyūkai	April 15, 1936	February 2, 1937
Parliamentary Undersecretary of the Navy	Nagata Zenzaburō	Rikken Minseitō	April 15, 1936	February 2, 1937
Parliamentary Undersecretary of Justice	Viscount Akizuki Tanehide	Independent	April 15, 1936	February 2, 1937
Parliamentary Undersecretary of Education	Sakuta Takatarō	Rikken Minseitō	April 15, 1936	December 28, 1936
Parliamentary Undersecretary of Education	Takechi Yūki	Rikken Minseitō	December 28, 1936	February 2, 1937
Parliamentary Undersecretary of Agriculture, Forestry and Fisheries	Kobayashi Kinuji	Rikken Seiyūkai	April 15, 1936	February 2, 1937
Parliamentary Undersecretary of Commerce and Industry	Terashima Gonzō	Rikken Minseitō	April 15, 1936	February 2, 1937
Parliamentary Undersecretary of Communications	Tada Mitsunaga	Independent	April 15, 1936	February 2, 1937
Parliamentary Undersecretary of Railways	Hoshijima Nirō	Rikken Seiyūkai	April 15, 1936	February 2, 1937
Parliamentary Undersecretary of Colonial Affairs	Hayashi Roichi	Shōwakai	April 15, 1936	February 2, 1937
