= Tatsunosuke Yamazaki =

Japanese politician

- 山崎 達之輔
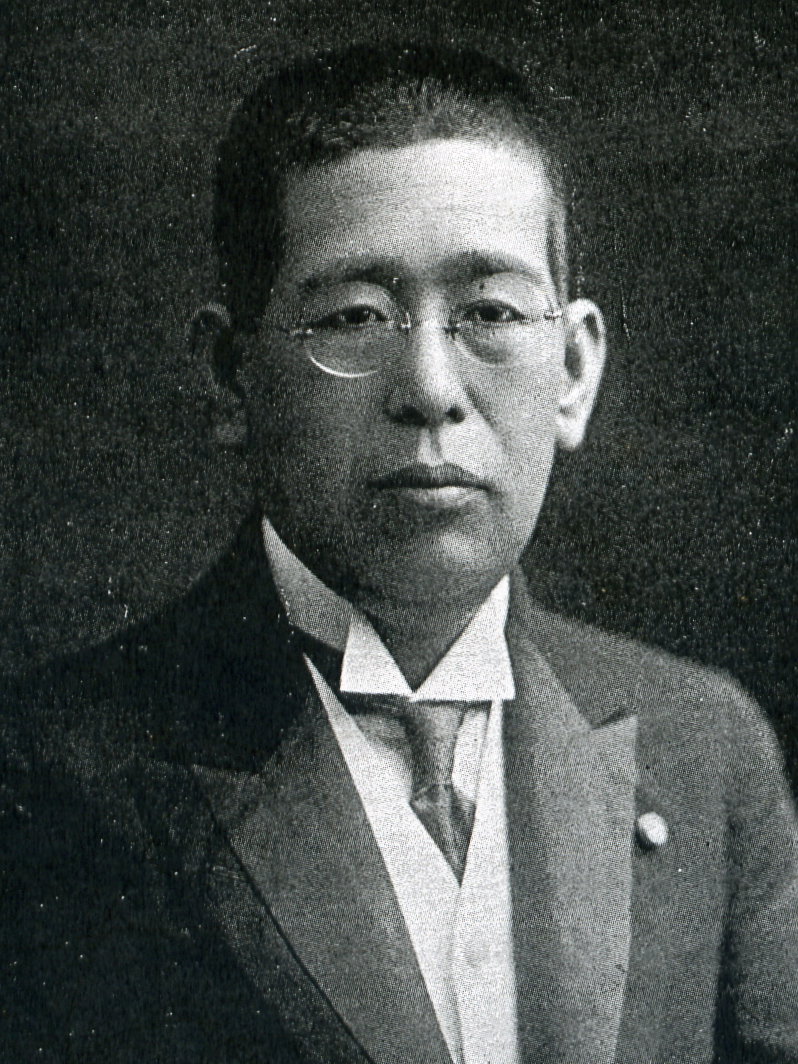
- Yamazaki in 1932

Minister of Agriculture and Commerce
- In office 1 November 1943 – 19 February 1944
- Prime Minister: Hideki Tojo
- Preceded by: Takahashi Korekiyo (1925)
- Succeeded by: Nobuya Uchida

Ministers of Agriculture and Forestry
- In office 20 April 1943 – 1 November 1943
- Prime Minister: Hideki Tojo
- Preceded by: Hiroya Ino
- Succeeded by: Kōtarō Sengoku (1945)
- In office 2 February 1937 – 4 June 1937
- Prime Minister: Senjūrō Hayashi
- Preceded by: Toshio Shimada
- Succeeded by: Yoriyasu Arima
- In office 8 July 1934 – 9 March 1936
- Prime Minister: Keisuke Okada
- Preceded by: Fumio Gotō
- Succeeded by: Toshio Shimada

Minister of Communications
- In office 2 February 1937 – 10 February 1937
- Prime Minister: Senjūrō Hayashi
- Preceded by: Tanomogi Keikichi
- Succeeded by: Hideo Kodama

Member of the House of Representatives
- In office 11 May 1924 – 18 December 1945
- Preceded by: Yoshihara Masataka
- Succeeded by: Constituency abolished
- Constituency: Fukuoka 13th (1924–1928); Fukuoka 3rd (1928–1945)

Personal details
- Born: 19 June 1880 Ōkawa, Fukuoka, Japan
- Died: 15 March 1948 (aged 67)
- Party: Rikken Seiyūkai (1925–1935; 1937–1940)
- Other political affiliations: Chūsei Club (1924–1925); Shōwakai (1935–1937); IRAA (1940–1945); JPP (1945–1946)
- Relatives: Iwao Yamazaki (brother); Heihachirō Yamazaki (nephew)
- Education: Kyoto Imperial University

Tatsunosuke Yamazaki (山崎 達之輔, Yamazaki Tatsunosuke; 19 June 1880 – 15 March 1948) was a Japanese was a politician and cabinet minister in the Taishō and early Shōwa periods of the Japan. His brother, Iwao Yamazaki was also a politician and cabinet minister, and his nephew Heihachirō Yamazaki was later a prominent member of the post-war Liberal-Democratic Party.

== Biography ==
Yamazaki was born in Ōkawa, Fukuoka. He graduated with a law degree from Kyoto Imperial University in 1906, after which he worked at the office of the Governor-General of Taiwan, and later as a bureaucrat at the Ministry of Education. In 1924, he was elected as an independent candidate in the Japanese general election of 1924 to the lower house of the Diet of Japan, but joined the Rikken Seiyūkai party the following year. He was reelected in 1928, 1930, and in 1932. In 1934, contrary to the orders of the Rikken Seiyūkai party he joined the cabinet of Prime Minister Okada as Minister of Agriculture and Forestry and was promptly expelled from the party. In response, Yamazaki formed the small Shōwakai political party, together with Tokonami Takejirō in 1935, and was reelected again in the 1936 General Election.

In February 1937, Yamazaki was re-appointed Minister of Agriculture and Forestry in the cabinet of Prime Minister Senjūrō Hayashi and concurrently to the post of Communications Minister for a one-week period. He was again reelected in the 1937 General Election. One of the conditions imposed by Hayashi is that Yamazaki renounce his political party affiliation.

In 1938, Yamazaki returned to the Rikken Seiyūkai, but to the reform faction headed by Chikuhei Nakajima. In 1940, he was one of the primary members creating the League of Diet Members Supporting the Prosecution of the Holy War and supported the creation of a one-party state under the Imperial Rule Assistance Association, serving as policy chief, standing affairs chief and finally as Deputy Chairman. He was reelected for a seventh time in 1942.

Under the administration of Prime Minister Hideki Tojo, Yamazaki was re-appointed Minister of Agriculture and Forestry, and in January 1943 became the first minister of the resurrected Ministry of Agriculture and Commerce. Following the surrender of Japan, he was one of the founding members of the short-lived Japan Progressive Party.

However, in 1946 he was purged from public office by the American occupation authorities and died in 1948.

Political offices
Preceded by Fumio Gotō	Minister of Agriculture and Forestry; 8 July 1934 – 9 March 1936	Succeeded by Toshio Shimada
Preceded by Tanomogi Keikichi	Minister of Communications; 2 Feb 1937 – 10 Feb 1937	Succeeded by Hideo Kodama
Preceded by Toshio Shimada	Minister of Agriculture and Forestry; 2 Feb 1937 – 4 June 1937	Succeeded by Yoriyasu Arima
Preceded by Hiroya Ino	Minister of Agriculture and Forestry; 4 Apr 1943 – 1 Nov 1943	Succeeded by -none-
Preceded by -none-	Minister of Agriculture and Commerce; 1 Nov 1943 – 19 Feb 1944	Succeeded by Nobuya Uchida
