= Hayashi cabinet =

Cabinet of Japan (February 2 - June 4, 1937)

Hayashi Cabinet
- 33rd Cabinet of Japan

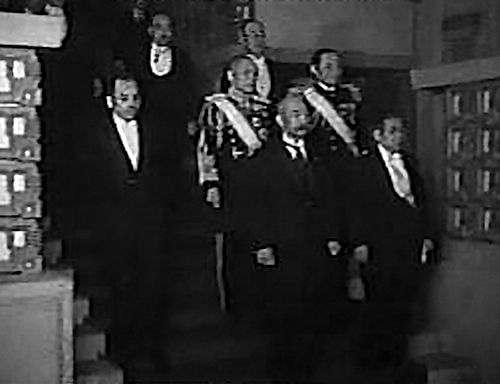
- Date formed: February 2, 1937
- Date dissolved: June 4, 1937

People and organisations
- Emperor: Shōwa
- Prime Minister: Senjūrō Hayashi
- Member party: Shōwakai with support from Kokumin Dōmei
- Status in legislature: Minority government

History
- Election: 1937 election
- Legislature term: 70th Imperial Diet
- Predecessor: Hirota Cabinet
- Successor: First Konoe Cabinet

The Hayashi Cabinet is the 33rd Cabinet of Japan led by Senjūrō Hayashi from February 2 to June 4, 1937.

== Cabinet ==
Ministers
| Portfolio | Name | Political party | Term start | Term end |
|---|---|---|---|---|
| Prime Minister | Senjūrō Hayashi | Military (Army) | February 2, 1937 | June 4, 1937 |
| Minister for Foreign Affairs | Senjūrō Hayashi | Military (Army) | February 2, 1937 | March 3, 1937 |
| Minister for Foreign Affairs | Naotake Satō | Independent | March 3, 1937 | June 4, 1937 |
| Minister of Home Affairs | Kakichi Kawarada | Independent | February 2, 1937 | June 4, 1937 |
| Minister of Finance | Toyotarō Yūki | Independent | February 2, 1937 | June 4, 1937 |
| Minister of the Army | Kōtarō Nakamura | Military (Army) | February 2, 1937 | February 9, 1937 |
| Minister of the Army | Hajime Sugiyama | Military (Army) | February 9, 1937 | June 4, 1937 |
| Minister of the Navy | Mitsumasa Yonai | Military (Navy) | February 2, 1937 | June 4, 1937 |
| Minister of Justice | Suehiko Shiono | Independent | February 2, 1937 | June 4, 1937 |
| Minister of Education | Senjūrō Hayashi | Military (Army) | February 2, 1937 | June 4, 1937 |
| Minister of Agriculture, Forestry and Fisheries | Tatsunosuke Yamazaki | Shōwakai | February 2, 1937 | June 4, 1937 |
| Minister of Commerce and Industry | Takuo Godō | Independent | February 2, 1937 | June 4, 1937 |
| Minister of Communications | Tatsunosuke Yamazaki | Shōwakai | February 2, 1937 | February 10, 1937 |
| Minister of Communications | Count Hideo Kodama | Independent | February 10, 1937 | June 4, 1937 |
| Minister of Railways | Takuo Godō | Independent | February 2, 1937 | June 4, 1937 |
| Minister of Colonial Affairs | Toyotarō Yūki | Independent | February 2, 1937 | June 4, 1937 |
| Chief Cabinet Secretary | Ōhashi Hachirō | Independent | February 2, 1937 | June 4, 1937 |
| Director-General of the Cabinet Legislation Bureau | Kawagoe Takeo | Independent | February 2, 1937 | June 4, 1937 |
