= Hokkaido 2nd district (1928–1942) =

Legislative district of Japan

== Election results ==
- 1937 Japanese general election
- 1936 Japanese general election
- 1932 Japanese general election
- 1930 Japanese general election
- 1928 Japanese general election
