= Shakai Taishūtō =

Left-wing political party in the Empire of Japan

Shakai Taishūtō 社会大衆党
- Leader: Abe Isoo (chairman); Hisashi Asō (secretary-general, later chairman)
- Founded: 24 July 1932
- Dissolved: 6 July 1940
- Merger of: Social Democratic Party; National Labour-Farmer Mass Party; National Masses Party; New Labour-Farmer Party
- Merged into: Imperial Rule Assistance Association
- Newspaper: Shakai Taishū Shinbun (社会大衆新聞)
- Trade union: Sōdōmei
- Ideology: Social democracy; Pan-Asianism; Japanese nationalism; Left-wing nationalism; Anti-communism; Anti-fascism (until 1934); After 1938: Kokkashugi
- Political position: Centre-left to left-wing (until 1938); Third Position (after 1938)

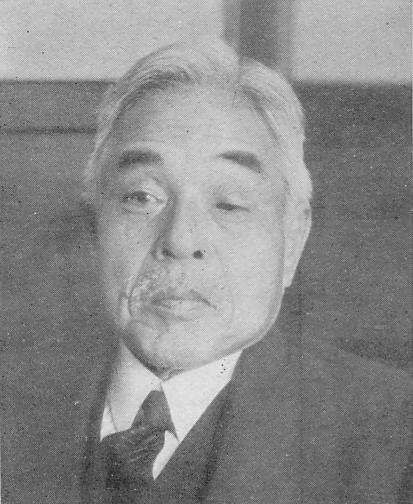
Abe Isoo, founder and chairman of the Shakai Taishūtō and head of the right-wing Shameikei (Social Democratic) faction.

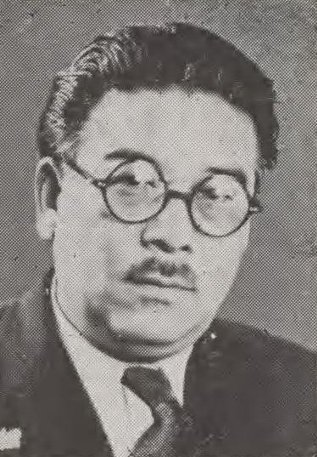
Hisashi Asō, secretary-general and later chairman of the party and head of the left-wing pro-military Nichirōkei (Japan Labour-Farmer) faction.

The Shakai Taishūtō (社会大衆党, Socialist Mass Party or Social Mass Party), abbreviated as Shadaitō (社大党), was a moderate leftist proletarian party in the early Shōwa period Empire of Japan. Formed in July 1932 by the merger of the National Labour-Farmer Mass Party and the Social Democratic Party, it was the only leftist party allowed to function throughout most of the 1930s and emerged as the third-largest party in the House of Representatives of the Diet of Japan, with 36–37 seats after the 1937 Japanese general election.

Initially social-democratic and committed to the "three anti-isms" (anti-capitalism, anti-communism, and anti-fascism), the party pursued an often contradictory middle course, advocating agrarian reform and better conditions for workers and farmers while cultivating ties with army factions and endorsing Japanese actions in Manchuria. From the mid-1930s it steadily shifted rightward toward national socialism. After the outbreak of the Second Sino-Japanese War in 1937 it fully supported the conflict, redefined its platform around a "trinity of nation, race, and class," and actively promoted the New Order Movement. Internal divisions over the 1940 expulsion of Saitō Takao led to the departure of its Social Democratic faction; the remaining leadership dissolved the party on 6 July 1940 and merged it into the Imperial Rule Assistance Association.

After the war, former members of the Shakai Taishūtō, among them Tetsu Katayama, Suehiro Nishio, and Inejirō Asanuma, became an important source of the Japan Socialist Party, predominantly its right wing.

== History ==
Prewar Japanese proletarian parties had long been fragmented through repeated splits and mergers. In July 1931 the New Labour-Farmer Party (労農党, Rōnōtō), the National Masses Party (全国大衆党, Zenkoku Taishūtō), and the pro-merger faction of the Social Democratic Party (Shakai Minshūtō) united to form the National Labour-Farmer Mass Party (全国労農大衆党, Zenkoku Rōnō Taishūtō). This paved the way for further unification. On 24 July 1932 the National Labour-Farmer Mass Party and the remaining Social Democratic Party merged to create the Shakai Taishūtō, with Abe Isoo as chairman and Hisashi Asō as secretary-general. The parties unified around shared support for the Sōdōmei trade union federation, which was close to the Social Democratic Party.

In a period of rising political extremism, the new party initially sought a middle-of-the-road course, resulting in an often contradictory policy. It supported agrarian reform and improved conditions for farmers by cutting the military budget, while simultaneously cultivating ties with the Tōseiha faction in the Imperial Japanese Army and endorsing Japanese actions during the invasion of Manchuria. It advocated greater international cooperation and opposed Japan's withdrawal from the League of Nations, yet supported the Second Sino-Japanese War after 1937.

The party inherited the "three anti-isms" (anti-capitalism, anti-communism, and anti-fascism) of the Social Democratic Party and initially focused on defending the living standards of workers, citizens, and farmers. It received support from a broad electorate, including middle-class shopkeepers resentful of the zaibatsu, salaried employees, and some lower-level bureaucrats. An important faction in the party's early history was that loyal to the left-wing "national socialism" of Motoyuki Takabatake, which rejected improved Japan–Soviet Union relations, the bureaucracy, and party politics. Takabatake sought the support of general Ugaki Kazushige to assist in a leftist seizure of power. Other supporters of the party, particularly the national socialist faction, would eventually include former prime minister Tanaka Giichi and other members of the Rikken Seiyūkai. After Takabatake's sudden death from cancer in December 1928, the faction continued to gain influence as a result of the Great Depression. In the aftermath of the invasion of Manchuria, the national socialist faction worked with Pan-Asianist and Japanese imperialist intellectual Shūmei Ōkawa, developing a policy favouring state socialism, central planning and class collaboration in the face of what it saw as a war between Japan and the imperialism of the white race, particularly the Anglosphere.

From the mid-1930s the party steadily shifted rightward. The October 1934 pamphlet "The Basic Principles of National Defense and Proposal for Strengthening It" (written by members of the Tōseiha), in contrast to the criticism it received from the two major parties and the press, was supported by Asō, who praised the authors of the pamphlet and renounced anti-fascism, expressing support for the reform bureaucrats. In turn, the powerful Home Ministry provided financial support and relaxed the typical police harassment of left-wing parties, seeing organised labour and the left as a fellow opponent of laissez-faire economic policies. Kamei and others articulated a clear national-socialist line, attracting sympathy among reform bureaucrats. In the 1936 Japanese general election the party won 18 seats; in the 1937 election it jumped to 36–37 seats and became the third-largest party in the House of Representatives.

After the outbreak of the Second Sino-Japanese War in July 1937 the party fully supported the conflict. At its national congress on 15 November 1937 it adopted a fundamental policy shift toward a "trinity of nation, race, and class," defining the war as a holy struggle to expel Anglo-American capitalism and Soviet influence from China, liberate the peoples of East Asia, and drive domestic national renovation. Capitalism and communism were both rejected in favour of national socialism.

In 1938 Kamei returned from a study tour of Nazi Germany and proposed a one-party system under the prime minister with dictatorial powers ("Great Japan Party Headquarters" plan), submitted to Prime Minister Fumimaro Konoe. The proposal lapsed when Konoe resigned. In 1939 the party explored merger with the National Alliance, Tōhōkai, and the Japan Reform Farmers' Council to create a single totalitarian national party; the plan collapsed when the Social Democratic (Shameikei) faction, led by Abe, refused to participate over personnel issues.

The final split occurred over the expulsion of Saitō Takao after his February 1940 "anti-military speech" criticising the conduct of the war in China. On 7 March 1940, ten members of the Social Democratic faction (including Abe Isoo, Suehiro Nishio, Tetsu Katayama, Chōzaburō Mizutani, and Bunji Suzuki) opposed or abstained from the party's decision to support Saitō's expulsion. Asō and Shōichi Miyake demanded their expulsion for "unpatriotic sentiments." Eight were expelled; Abe resigned as chairman. On 27 April 1940 the Central Committee elected Asō chairman and Jūsō Miwa secretary-general, placing the Japan Labour-Farmer (Nichirōkei) faction in full control.

The party then actively promoted the New Order Movement and one-party rule. On 6 July 1940 it dissolved itself with the declaration "Comrades bound by blood have fallen before us, suffering friends have been wounded behind us; looking back over thirty years, all is as a dream," and merged into the Imperial Rule Assistance Association. After Asō's sudden death in September 1940, former party members were largely sidelined within the Association, which itself soon lost its intended character as a political party and became an administrative organ under the Home Ministry.

=== Postwar legacy ===
After the Second World War the Shakai Taishūtō became one of the main sources of the Japan Socialist Party (JSP). Former Diet members of the party included Tetsu Katayama (first JSP chairman and prime minister), Jūsō Miwa, Jōtarō Kawakami, Suehiro Nishio, Inejirō Asanuma, and Jiichirō Matsumoto. Most belonged to the right wing of the JSP; many later joined the Democratic Socialist Party after the 1960 split.

== Ideology and policies ==
Initially social-democratic, anti-capitalist, anti-communist, and anti-fascist, the party moved after 1937–38 toward national socialism (kokkashugi), totalitarianism, and a "third position" rejecting both capitalism and communism.

=== Slogans (6th Party Congress) ===
- For the achievement of true national unity!
- Realization of wartime social policy
- Planning of the national economy
- National unity! Labour service to the nation

=== Platform (after the shift) ===
- Based on the fundamental principles of the national polity, to promote the progress and development of the Japanese people and thereby contribute to the advancement of human culture.
- Representing the working masses, to reform capitalism and thereby achieve the planned organisation of industry and the stabilisation of national life.
- Thoroughgoing broad national defence
- Freedom of commerce, emigration, and utilisation of resources

== Election results ==
Election	Votes	%	Seats	Change
1936	518,844	4.66	18 / 466	Steady
1937	928,934	9.10	37 / 466	▲19

(Some contemporary sources record 36 seats in 1937.)
