= Koiso cabinet =

Cabinet of Japan (1944–1945)

Koiso Cabinet
- 41st Cabinet of Japan

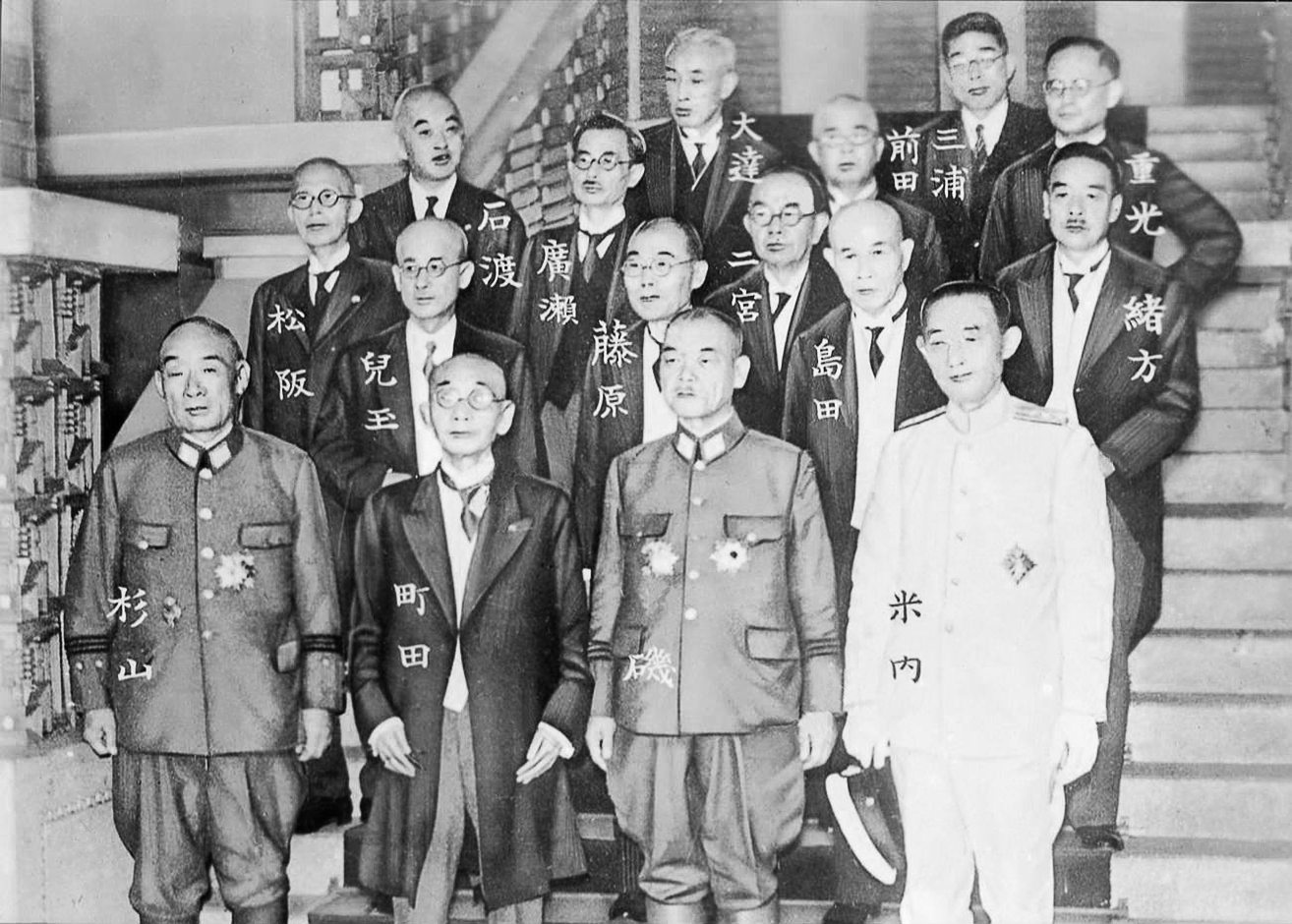
- Date formed: July 22, 1944
- Date dissolved: April 7, 1945

People and organisations
- Emperor: Shōwa
- Prime Minister: Kuniaki Koiso
- Member party: Imperial Rule Assistance Association (Taisei Yokusankai); Dai Nippon Seijikai (from March 30, 1945); Independent; Military
- Status in legislature: Majority (coalition)

History
- Legislature term: 85th-86th Imperial Diet
- Predecessor: Tōjō Cabinet
- Successor: Kantarō Suzuki Cabinet

The Koiso Cabinet is the 41st Cabinet of Japan led by Kuniaki Koiso from July 22, 1944 to April 7, 1945.

== Cabinet ==
Ministers
Portfolio	Name	Political party	Term start	Term end
Prime Minister	Kuniaki Koiso	Taisei Yokusankai	July 22, 1944	April 7, 1945
Minister for Foreign Affairs	Mamoru Shigemitsu	Independent	July 22, 1944	April 7, 1945
Minister of Home Affairs	Shigeo Ōdachi	Independent	July 22, 1944	April 7, 1945
Minister of Finance	Sōtarō Ishiwata	Taisei Yokusankai	July 22, 1944	February 21, 1945
Minister of Finance	Juichi Tsushima	Independent	February 21, 1945	April 7, 1945
Minister of the Army	Hajime Sugiyama	Military (Army)	July 22, 1944	April 7, 1945
Minister of the Navy	Mitsumasa Yonai	Military (Navy)	July 22, 1944	April 7, 1945
Minister of Justice	Hiromasa Matsuzaka	Independent	July 22, 1944	April 7, 1945
Minister of Education	Harushige Ninomiya	Military (Army)	July 22, 1944	February 10, 1945
Minister of Education	Hideo Kodama	Dai Nippon Seijikai	February 10, 1945	April 7, 1945
Minister of Health	Hisatada Hirose	Taisei Yokusankai	July 22, 1944	February 10, 1945
Minister of Health	Katsuroku Aikawa	Independent	February 10, 1945	April 7, 1945
Minister of Greater East Asia	Mamoru Shigemitsu	Independent	July 22, 1944	April 7, 1945
Minister of Agriculture and Commerce	Toshio Shimada	Dai Nippon Seijikai	July 22, 1944	April 7, 1945
Minister of Munitions	Ginjirō Fujiwara	Independent	July 22, 1944	December 19, 1944
Minister of Munitions	Shigeru Yoshida	Independent	December 19, 1944	April 7, 1945
Minister of Transportation and Communications	Yonezō Maeda	Dai Nippon Seijikai	July 22, 1944	April 7, 1945
Minister of State	Chūji Machida	Dai Nippon Seijikai	July 22, 1944	April 7, 1945
Minister of State	Hideo Kodama	Taisei Yokusankai	July 22, 1944	February 10, 1945
Minister of State	Hisatada Hirose	Taisei Yokusankai	February 10, 1945	February 21, 1945
Minister of State	Sōtarō Ishiwata	Dai Nippon Seijikai	February 21, 1945	April 7, 1945
Minister of State	Taketora Ogata	Independent	July 22, 1944	April 7, 1945
Minister of State	Seizō Kobayashi	Taisei Yokusankai	December 19, 1944	March 1, 1945
Chief Cabinet Secretary	Kunio Miura	Independent	July 22, 1944	July 29, 1944
Chief Cabinet Secretary	Takeo Tanaka	Independent	July 29, 1944	February 10, 1945
Chief Cabinet Secretary	Hisatada Hirose	Taisei Yokusankai	February 10, 1945	February 21, 1945
Chief Cabinet Secretary	Sōtarō Ishiwata	Dai Nippon Seijikai	February 21, 1945	April 7, 1945
Director-General of the Cabinet Legislation Bureau	Kunio Miura	Independent	July 22, 1944	April 7, 1945
Parliamentary Vice-Ministers
Portfolio	Name	Political party	Term start	Term end
Parliamentary Vice-Minister for Foreign Affairs	Masayuki Matsuda	Independent	September 1, 1944	April 7, 1945
Parliamentary Vice-Minister of Home Affairs	Takechi Yūki	Dai Nippon Seijikai	September 1, 1944	April 7, 1945
Parliamentary Vice-Minister of Finance	Ogasawara Sankurō	Dai Nippon Seijikai	September 1, 1944	April 7, 1945
Parliamentary Vice-Minister of the Army	Ōshima Rikutarō	Independent	September 1, 1944	April 7, 1945
Parliamentary Vice-Minister of the Navy	Kishida Masaki	Dai Nippon Seijikai	September 1, 1944	April 7, 1945
Parliamentary Vice-Minister of Justice	Nakai Kazuo	Dai Nippon Seijikai	September 1, 1944	April 7, 1945
Parliamentary Vice-Minister of Education	Imai Takehiko	Dai Nippon Seijikai	September 1, 1944	April 7, 1945
Parliamentary Vice-Minister of Health	Nakaigawa Hiroshi	Dai Nippon Seijikai	September 1, 1944	April 7, 1945
Parliamentary Vice-Minister of Greater East Asia	Shinohara Rokurō	Dai Nippon Seijikai	September 1, 1944	April 7, 1945
Parliamentary Vice-Minister of Agriculture and Commerce	Oyama Kuranosuke	Dai Nippon Seijikai	September 1, 1944	April 7, 1945
Parliamentary Vice-Minister of Munitions	Matsumura Kōzō	Dai Nippon Seijikai	September 1, 1944	April 7, 1945
Parliamentary Vice-Minister of Transport and Communications	Maeda Fusanosuke	Dai Nippon Seijikai	September 1, 1944	April 7, 1945
Parliamentary Undersecretaries
Portfolio	Name	Political party	Term start	Term end
Parliamentary Undersecretary for Foreign Affairs	Morishita Kunio	Dai Nippon Seijikai	September 1, 1944	April 7, 1945
Parliamentary Undersecretary of Home Affairs	Satō Yōnosuke	Dai Nippon Seijikai	September 1, 1944	April 7, 1945
Parliamentary Undersecretary of Finance	Tamura Hidekichi	Dai Nippon Seijikai	September 1, 1944	April 7, 1945
Parliamentary Undersecretary of the Army	Yorimitsu Yoshiaki	Dai Nippon Seijikai	September 1, 1944	April 7, 1945
Parliamentary Undersecretary of the Navy	Nakano Toshio	Independent	September 1, 1944	April 7, 1945
Parliamentary Undersecretary of Justice	Muneyoshi Tokugawa	Independent	September 1, 1944	April 7, 1945
Parliamentary Undersecretary of Education	Michiharu Mishima	Independent	September 1, 1944	April 7, 1945
Parliamentary Undersecretary of Health	Motoharu Baba	Dai Nippon Seijikai	September 1, 1944	April 7, 1945
Parliamentary Undersecretary of Greater East Asia	Nakanishi Toshikazu	Dai Nippon Seijikai	September 1, 1944	April 7, 1945
Parliamentary Undersecretary of Agriculture and Commerce	Nagano Kōichi	Dai Nippon Seijikai	September 1, 1944	April 7, 1945
Parliamentary Undersecretary of Munitions	Nakamura Umekichi	Dai Nippon Seijikai	September 1, 1944	April 7, 1945
Parliamentary Undersecretary of Transport and Communications	Nanjō Tokuo	Dai Nippon Seijikai	September 1, 1944	April 7, 1945
