= Hideo Kodama =

Japanese politician (1876-1947)

Count Hideo Kodama
- 兒玉 秀雄
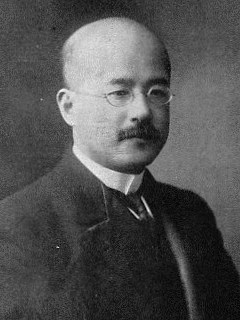

Minister of Education
- In office 10 February 1945 – 7 April 1945
- Prime Minister: Kuniaki Koiso
- Preceded by: Harushige Ninomiya
- Succeeded by: Kōzō Ōta

Minister of Home Affairs
- In office 16 January 1940 – 22 July 1940
- Prime Minister: Mitsumasa Yonai
- Preceded by: Naoshi Ohara
- Succeeded by: Eiji Yasui

Minister of Communications
- In office 10 February 1937 – 4 June 1937
- Prime Minister: Senjūrō Hayashi
- Preceded by: Tatsunosuke Yamazaki
- Succeeded by: Ryūtarō Nagai

Minister of Colonial Affairs
- In office 25 October 1934 – 9 March 1936
- Prime Minister: Keisuke Okada
- Preceded by: Keisuke Okada
- Succeeded by: Hidejirō Nagata

Chief of Political Affairs, Government-General of Korea
- In office 4 April 1929 – 19 June 1931
- Governors General: Hanzō Yamanashi; Makoto Saitō
- Preceded by: Shirou Ikegami
- Succeeded by: Kiyonori Imaida

8th Governor-General of the Kwantung Leased Territory
- In office 26 September 1923 – 17 December 1927
- Monarchs: Taishō; Hirohito
- Preceded by: Hikokichi Ijūin
- Succeeded by: Kenjirō Kinoshita

Chief Cabinet Secretary
- In office 9 October 1916 – 29 September 1918
- Prime Minister: Masatake Terauchi
- Preceded by: Tasuku Egi
- Succeeded by: Mitsutake Takahashi

Member of the House of Peers
- In office 15 February 1919 – 12 February 1946 Elected by the Counts
- In office 10 July 1911 – 10 July 1918 Elected by the Counts

Personal details
- Born: 19 July 1876 Yamaguchi Prefecture, Japan
- Died: 7 April 1947 (aged 70) Tokyo, Japan
- Resting place: Tama Cemetery
- Party: Independent
- Parent: Gentarō Kodama (father)
- Relatives: Kyūichi Kodama (brother); Masatake Terauchi (father-in-law); Hisaichi Terauchi (brother-in-law)
- Education: Tokyo Imperial University

Count Hideo Kodama (兒玉 秀雄, Kodama Hideo; 19 July 1876 – 7 April 1947) was a Japanese official and politician who served as cabinet minister. He was the eldest son of famed Russo-Japanese War general Gentarō Kodama, and his wife was the daughter of Prime Minister Masatake Terauchi.

== Biography ==
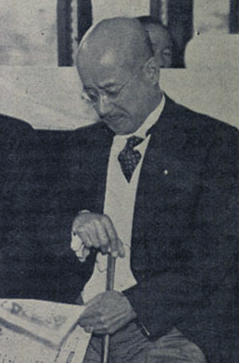
Kodama Hideo in July 1935

Kodama was born in Yamaguchi Prefecture. After graduating from the Law School of Tokyo Imperial University in 1900, he obtained a position at the Ministry of Finance, passing his career civil service examinations the same year. He served in a number of bureaucratic posts. During the Russo-Japanese War, he was assigned to the Imperial General Headquarters and sent to the Liaodong Peninsula (under Japanese occupation), where he served as liaison between the civilian government in Tokyo and the Japanese general armies in Manchuria. Following the war, he returned to the Finance Ministry as head of the government's Tobacco Monopoly. He was later assigned to serve in the Japanese Government-General of Korea, as a secretary to the Privy Council, and as a member of the House of Peers.

Upon his father's death on 23 July 1906, he inherited the title of viscount and took a seat in the House of Peers. After petitioning the Meiji Emperor, the emperor elevated him to count on 2 October 1907 in recognition of his father's service. From 1916 to 1918, he served as Chief Cabinet Secretary. From 26 September 1923 to 17 December 1927 Kodama was governor of the Kwantung Leased Territory. In the late 1920s, Kodama was the civilian administrator of Korea.

In October 1934, Kodama was picked to be Minister of Colonization under the Okada Cabinet. In February 1937, he became Minister of Communications under the Hayashi Cabinet. From January to July 1940, Kodama served as Home Minister under the Yonai Cabinet. He visited Java in Japanese-occupied Netherlands East Indies as a special advisor in 1942 at the request of the Imperial Japanese Army. In 1944, Kodama served as a minister without portfolio under the Koiso Cabinet, and from February to April 1945, served as Education Minister in the same administration.

After the surrender of Japan, Kodama was purged from public service by the Supreme Commander of the Allied Powers. He died in 1947, and his grave is at the Tama Cemetery in Fuchū, Tokyo.

== Notes ==
Political offices
Preceded by Tasuku Eda	Chief Cabinet Secretary; 1916–1918	Succeeded by Mitsutake Takahashi
Preceded by Hikokichi Ijuin	Governor of the Kwantung Leased Territory; Sept 1923 – Dec 1927	Succeeded by Kenjirō Kinoshita
Preceded by Keisuke Okada	Minister of Colonial Affairs; Oct 1934 – Mar 1936	Succeeded by Hidejirō Nagata
Preceded by Tatsunosuke Yamazaki	Minister of Communications; 1937	Succeeded by Ryūtarō Nagai
Preceded by Naoshi Ohara	Minister of Home Affairs; Jan–Jul 1940	Succeeded by Eiji Yasui
Preceded by Harushige Ninomiya	Minister of Education; 1945	Succeeded by Kōzō Ōta
