= Shōwakai =

Shōwakai 昭和会
- Founded: December 1935
- Split from: Rikken Seiyukai
- Merged into: Rikken Seiyukai
- Ideology: Anti-Kisaburō Suzuki; Anti-Ichirō Hatoyama; Pro-Okada Cabinet (1935-1936); Pro-Hayashi Cabinet (1937)

The Shōwakai (Japanese: 昭和会, lit. 'Shōwa Society') was a political party in Japan.

== History ==
The party was established in December 1935 by a group of 18 MPs who had left Rikken Seiyūkai and Mushozoku Club in protest at the former's decision to continue to oppose Keisuke Okada's government. Three Rikken Seiyūkai MPs, Uchida Nobuya, Tatsunosuke Yamazaki and Tokonami Takejirō had been expelled from the party after accepting cabinet positions, and the expulsions continued when several other MPs joined the government's Cabinet Deliberation Council. A dissident Seiyūkai party was then proposed by Tokonami, who had already led a dissident Seiyūkai party in 1920s. This proposal gave birth to Shōwakai, with Tokonami being its supposed leader. However, Tokonami died before the party's establishment, and the party failed to appoint a leader. Generally, the party was led by its militants in the cabinet.

In the 1936 elections the new party won 20 seats. Although several MPs joined it during the parliamentary term, it was reduced to 19 seats in the 1937 elections. Following the elections it was dissolved and the majority of its members rejoined Rikken Seiyūkai.

== Election results ==
Election	Votes	%	Seats	Change
1936	531,772	4.78	20 / 466	Steady
1937	414,088	4.06	19 / 466	▼1
