= Fumio Gotō =

Japanese politician (1884–1980)

Junior Second Rank Fumio Gotō
- 後藤 文夫
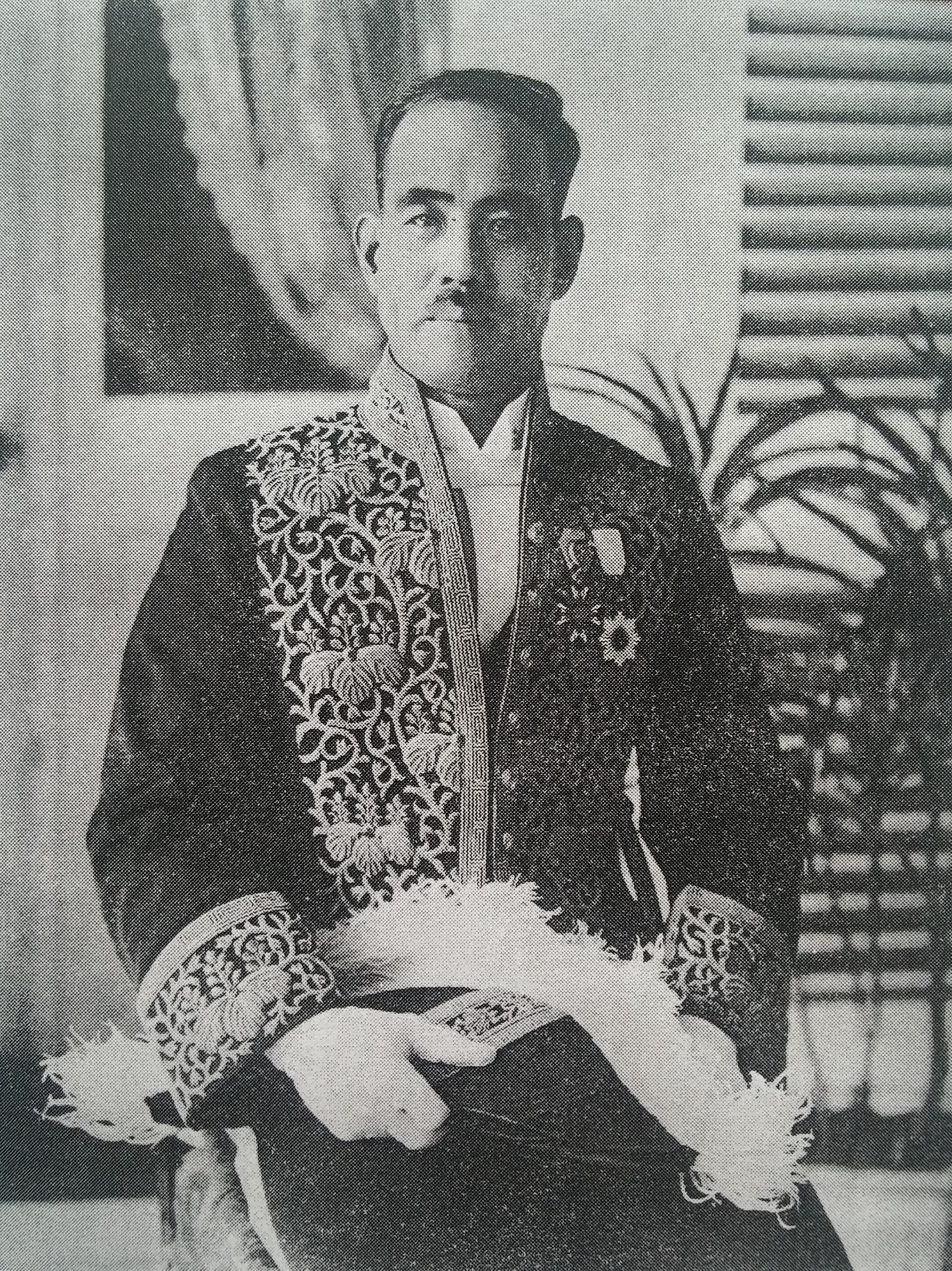

Acting Prime Minister of Japan
- In office 26 February 1936 – 29 February 1936
- Monarch: Hirohito
- Preceded by: Keisuke Okada
- Succeeded by: Keisuke Okada

Vice President of the Imperial Rule Assistance Association
- In office 21 April 1943 – 22 July 1944
- President: Hideki Tojo
- Preceded by: Kisaburō Andō
- Succeeded by: Taketora Ogata

Minister of Home Affairs
- In office 8 July 1934 – 9 March 1936
- Prime Minister: Keisuke Okada
- Preceded by: Yamamoto Tatsuo
- Succeeded by: Shigenosuke Ushio

Minister of Agriculture and Forestry
- In office 26 May 1932 – 8 July 1934
- Prime Minister: Saitō Makoto
- Preceded by: Teijirō Yamamoto
- Succeeded by: Tatsunosuke Yamazaki

Member of the House of Councillors
- In office 3 May 1953 – 2 June 1959
- Preceded by: Jinzo Iwao
- Succeeded by: Haruzo Murakami
- Constituency: Oita at-large

Member of the House of Peers
- In office 23 December 1930 – 18 December 1945 Nominated by the Emperor

Personal details
- Born: 7 March 1884 Ōita City, Ōita, Japan
- Died: 13 May 1980 (aged 96) Tokyo, Japan
- Party: Ryokufūkai (1947–1960)
- Other political affiliations: Independent (1930–1940); IRAA (1940–1945)
- Children: Masao Gotō
- Education: Tokyo Imperial University

Fumio Gotō (後藤 文夫, Gotō Fumio; 7 March 1884 – 13 May 1980) was a Japanese politician and bureaucrat, and briefly served as interim Prime Minister of Japan in 1936.

== Early life ==
Born in Ōita Prefecture, Gotō was a graduate of the Law School of Tokyo Imperial University in 1909. During his early career in the 1920s, he worked in the Home Ministry, and was Director of Administration within the office of the Governor-General of Taiwan.

== Political career ==
In 1930, Gotō was appointed to a seat in the House of Peers in the Diet of Japan. He served as Minister of Agriculture, Forestry and Fisheries between 1932 and 1934 in the cabinet of Prime Minister Makoto Saitō, and was later Home Minister in the cabinet of Keisuke Okada.

Immediately after the 26 February Incident, Gotō served as acting Prime Minister while Prime Minister Okada was in hiding from his attempted assassins. He was chairman of the Taisei Yokusankai from 1941–1943, and under the administration of Hideki Tōjō, he served as a Minister of State.

Arrested by the American occupation authorities after the surrender of Japan, he was held in Sugamo Prison in Tokyo awaiting prosecution for war crimes, but was released in 1948 without trial. From April 1953 to June 1959, he served as a member of House of Councillors in the post-war Diet of Japan. He was appointed a Grand Cordon of the Order of the Rising Sun in November 1971.

== Awards and decorations ==
=== Japanese ===
==== Court ranks ====
- Junior Seventh Rank (22 March 1910)
- Senior Seventh Rank (20 February 1913)
- Junior Sixth Rank (20 March 1915)
- Senior Sixth Rank (20 March 1917)
- Junior Fifth Rank (21 November 1921)
- Senior Fifth Rank (10 July 1922)
- Junior Fourth Rank (1 November 1926)
- Junior Third Rank (1 June 1932)
- Senior Third Rank (15 June 1934)
- Junior Second Rank (13 May 1980)

==== Decorations ====
- Emperor Taishō Enthronement Commemorative Medal (10 November 1915)
- Order of the Rising Sun, 6th Class (19 January 1916)
- Order of the Rising Sun, 5th Class (1 April 1916)
- Order of the Sacred Treasure, 4th Class (1 November 1920)
- First World War Medal (2 November 1920)
- First National Census Commemorative Medal (1 July 1921)
- Order of the Sacred Treasure, 3rd Class (26 August 1926)
- Order of the Sacred Treasure, 2nd Class (10 September 1930)
- Order of the Sacred Treasure, 1st Class (29 April 1934)
- China Incident War Medal (29 April 1934)
- One Silver Cup (29 April 1940)
- 2600th National Anniversary Commemorative Medal (15 August 1940)
- One Wooden Cup (5 May 1942)
- Medal of Honor with Blue Ribbon (3 November 1960)
- Grand Cordon of the Order of the Rising Sun (3 November 1971)

=== Foreign ===
- France: Grand Officier of the Order of the Dragon of Annam (1 February 1927)
- Manchukuo
  - National Foundation Commemorative Medal (1 March 1934)
  - Order of the Auspicious Clouds, 1st Class (9 May 1934)
  - Imperial Visit Commemorative Medal (21 September 1935)

== Sources ==
- Bix, Herbert P. (2001). Hirohito and the Making of Modern Japan. Harper Perennial. ISBN 0060931302.
- Sims, Richard (2001). Japanese Political History Since the Meiji Renovation 1868–2000. Palgrave Macmillan. ISBN 0312239157.
- van Wolferen, Karel (1990). The Enigma of Japanese Power: People and Politics in a Stateless Nation. Harper Perennial. ISBN 0679728023.

Political offices
Preceded by Keisuke Okada	Prime Minister of Japan (Acting); 26 February 1936 – 29 February 1936	Succeeded by Keisuke Okada
Preceded by Yamamoto Tatsuo	Minister of Home Affairs; 8 July 1934 – 9 March 1936	Succeeded by Shigenosuke Ushio
Preceded by Teijirō Yamamoto	Minister of Agriculture & Forestry; 26 May 1932 – 8 July 1934	Succeeded by Tatsunosuke Yamazaki
