= 1936 Japanese general election =

- 20 February 1936

All 466 seats in the House of Representatives 234 seats needed for a majority
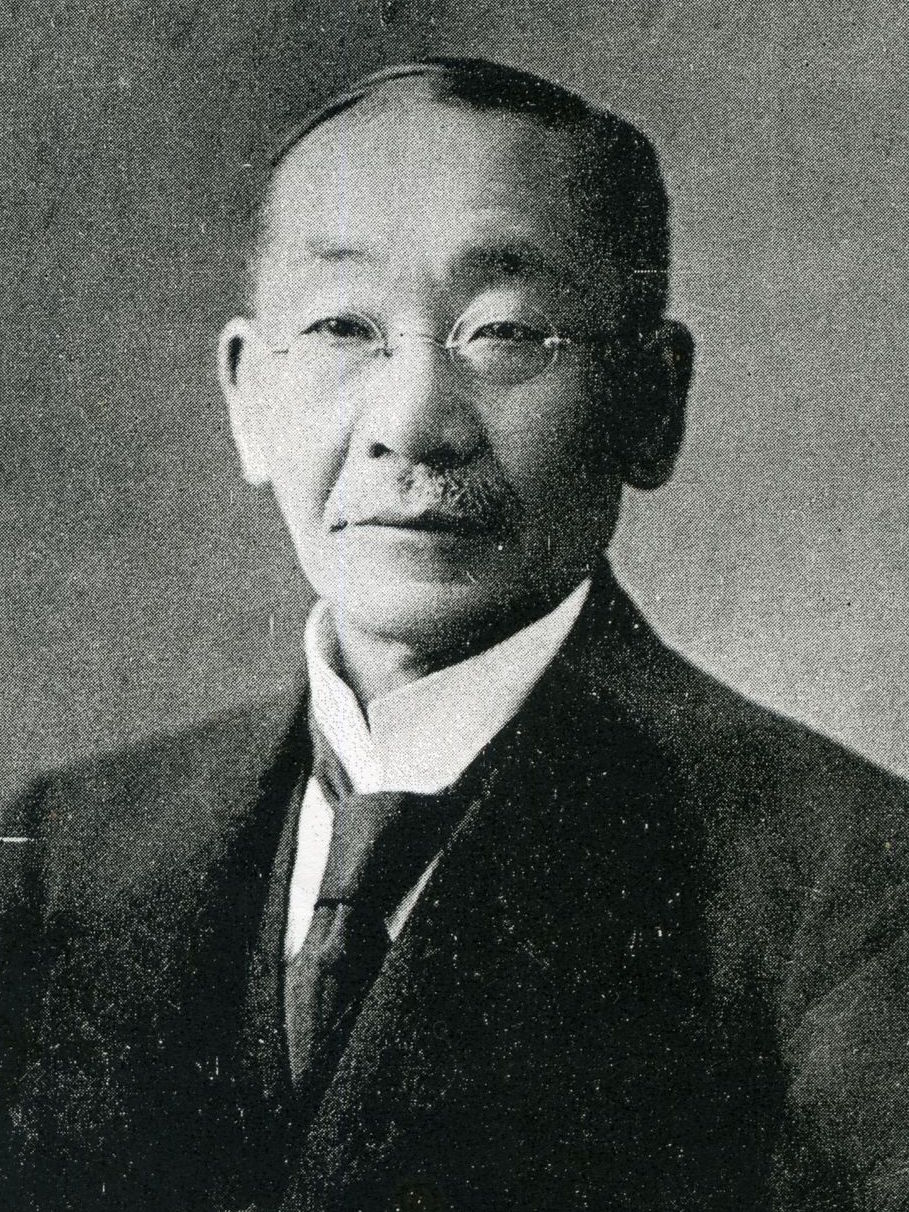

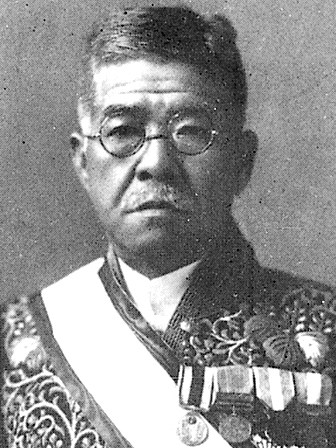

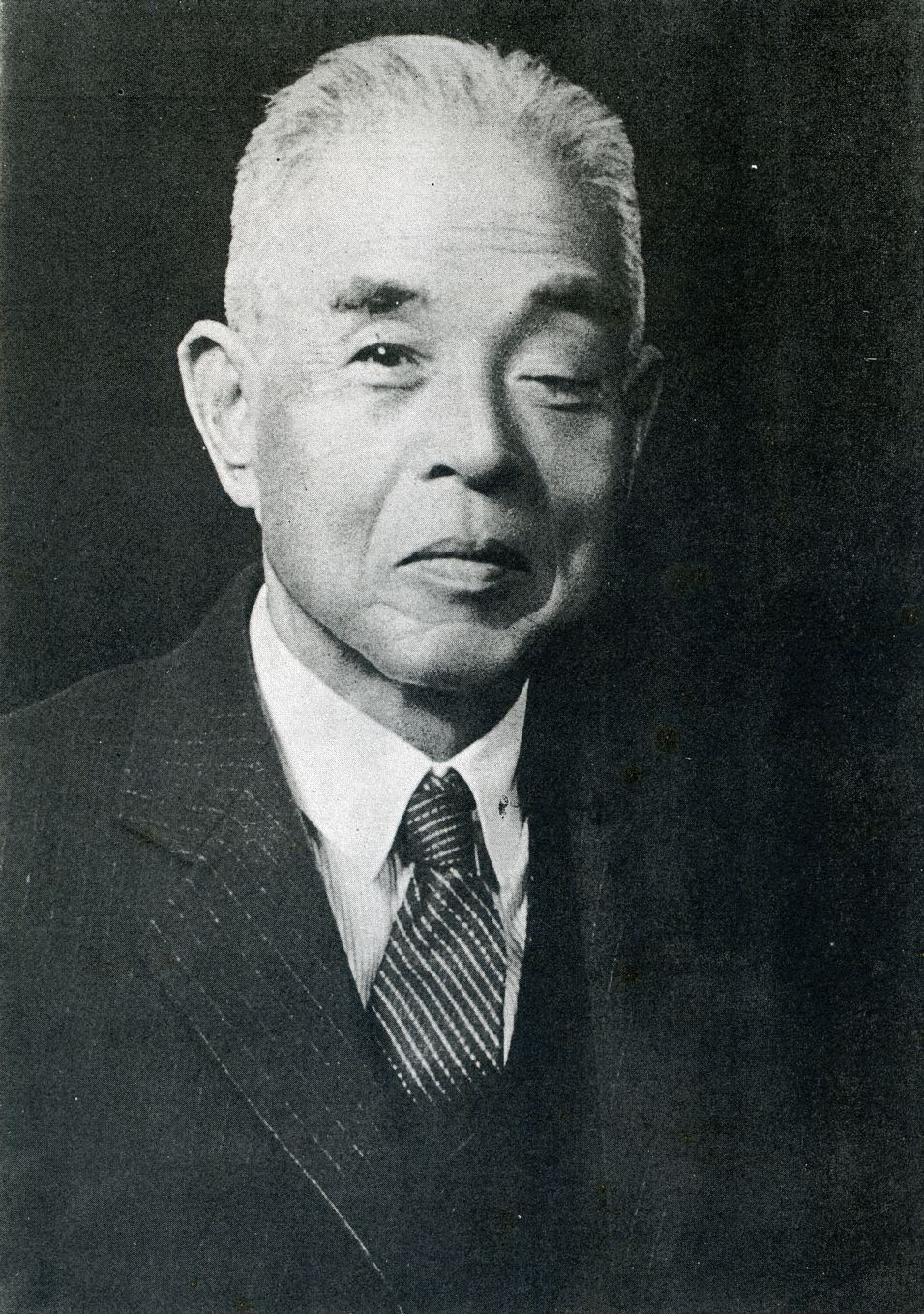

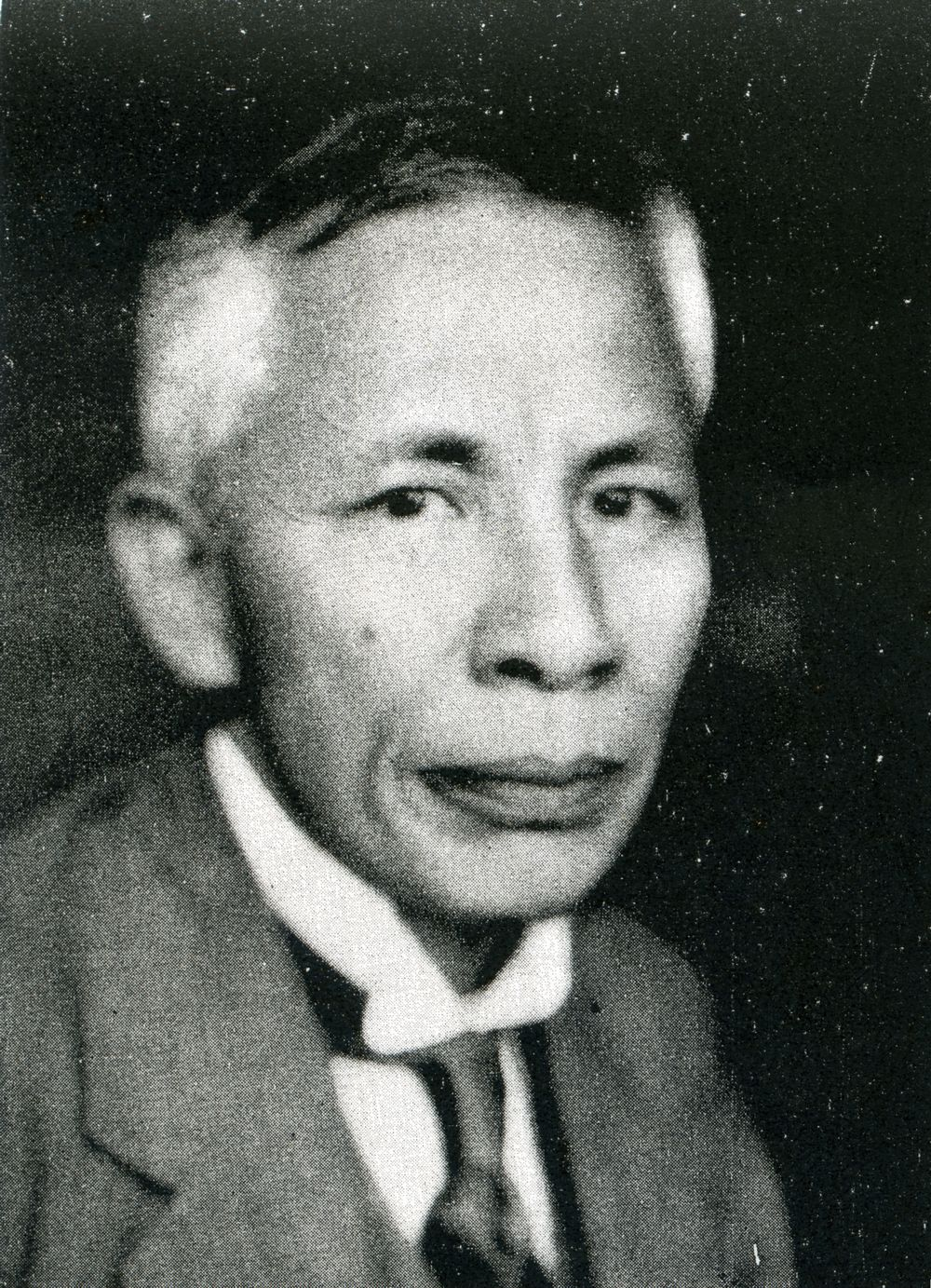
	First party	Second party	Third party
			SWK
Leader	Machida Chūji	Suzuki Kisaburō	Vacant
Party	Rikken Minseitō	Rikken Seiyūkai	Shōwakai
Last election	35.25%, 146 seats	32.25%, 301 seats	–
Seats won	205	174	18
Seat change	▲59	▼127	New party
Popular vote	4,444,413	4,188,029	531,772
Percentage	39.92%	37.62%	4.78%
Swing	▲4.67pp	▼20.58pp	New party
	Fourth party	Fifth party
Leader	Abe Isoo	Adachi Kenzō
Party	Shakai Taishūtō	Kokumin Dōmei
Last election	2.59%, 5 seats (Note: Combined performance of Social Democratic Party and Rōnō Taishūtō.)	–
Seats won	18	15
Seat change	▲13	New party
Popular vote	518,844	421,632
Percentage	4.66%	3.79%
Swing	▲2.07pp	New party
- Districts shaded according to winners' vote strength
Prime Minister before election
Keisuke Okada
Imperial Japanese Navy
Prime Minister after election
Kōki Hirota
Independent

General elections were held in Japan on 20 February 1936. Rikken Minseitō emerged as the largest party in the House of Representatives, winning 205 of the 466 seats and securing a slim majority with parties in support of the government. Following the elections, an attempted coup took place on 26 February.

Formed in 1934, the Okada administration faced a fierce opposition from Rikken Seiyūkai, the largest bloc in the House of Representatives at the time, and had to rely on a minority coalition composed of Rikken Minseitō and a group of Seiyūkai dissidents led by Tokonami Takejirō (the group then became Shōwakai). The administration sought to obtain a majority with its coalition partners in this election. Though the goal was fulfilled, the administration collapsed almost immediately in the aftermath of the February 26 Incident. Elder Saionji Kinmochi then called diplomat Hirota Kōki to form a new cabinet with endorsement from both Minseitō and Seiyūkai, after the initial invitation to Konoe Fumimaro was declined.

== Electoral system ==
The 466 members of the House of Representatives were elected from multi-member constituencies with between three and five seats.

== Results ==
Party	Votes	%	Seats	+/–
Rikken Minseitō	4,444,413	39.92	205	+59
Rikken Seiyūkai	4,188,029	37.62	174	–127
Shōwakai	531,772	4.78	20	New
Shakai Taishūtō	518,844	4.66	18	+13
Kokumin Dōmei	421,632	3.79	15	New
Others	1,027,988	9.23	34	+22
Total	11,132,678	100.00	466	0
Valid votes	11,132,678	98.96		
Invalid/blank votes	116,886	1.04		
Total votes	11,249,564	100.00		
Registered voters/turnout	14,304,546	78.64		
Source: Voice Japan

=== By prefecture ===
Prefecture	Total seats	Seats won						
Prefecture	Total seats	Rikken Minseitō	Rikken Seiyūkai	Shōwakai	Shakai Taishūtō	Kokumin Dōmei	Others	Ind.
Aichi	17	7	6			1		3
Akita	7	4	2		1			
Aomori	6	2	3	1				
Chiba	11	5	6					
Ehime	9	5	4					
Fukui	5	2	1	1				1
Fukuoka	18	4	8	1	1			4
Fukushima	11	6	5					
Gifu	9	5	4					
Gunma	9	5	3	1				
Hiroshima	13	7	3	3				
Hokkaido	20	10	7	1				2
Hyōgo	19	10	7		1	1		
Ibaraki	11	4	3	3		1		
Ishikawa	6	3	3					
Iwate	7	1	5	1				
Kagawa	6	3	3					
Kagoshima	12		7	1				4
Kanagawa	11	6	3		2			
Kōchi	6	2	2		1		1	
Kumamoto	10	1	5			4		
Kyoto	11	8	2		1			
Mie	9	5	3					1
Miyagi	8	3	4	1				
Miyazaki	5	1	2	1		1		
Nagano	13	7	3				1	2
Nagasaki	9	4	3	1				1
Nara	5	3	1					1
Niigata	15	7	4		1	2		1
Ōita	7	3	4					
Okayama	10	3	6				1	
Okinawa	5	2	2			1		
Osaka	21	11	4	1	4			1
Saga	6	4	2					
Saitama	11	4	5			1		1
Shiga	5	2	2			1		
Shimane	6	5	1					
Shizuoka	13	5	6	1	1			
Tochigi	9	6	3					
Tokushima	6	3	2					1
Tokyo	31	16	8		5		1	1
Tottori	4	2		1		1		
Toyama	6	3	3					
Wakayama	6	2	3					1
Yamagata	8	2	4			1		1
Yamaguchi	9	1	6	1				1
Yamanashi	5	1	1				2	1
Total	466	205	174	20	18	15	6	28
