= 1937 Japanese general election =

- 30 April 1937

All 466 seats in the House of Representatives 234 seats needed for a majority
- Turnout: 71.64% (▼7.00pp)
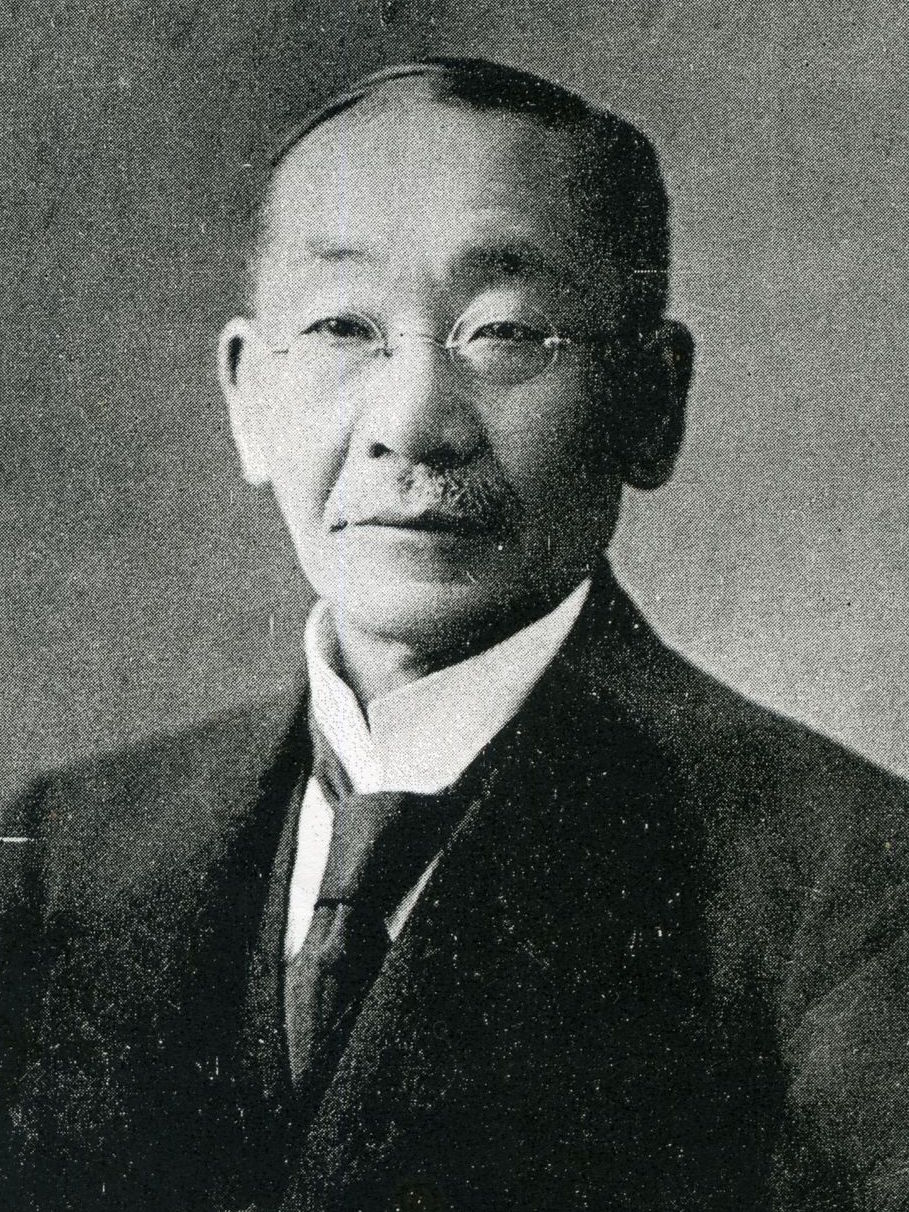

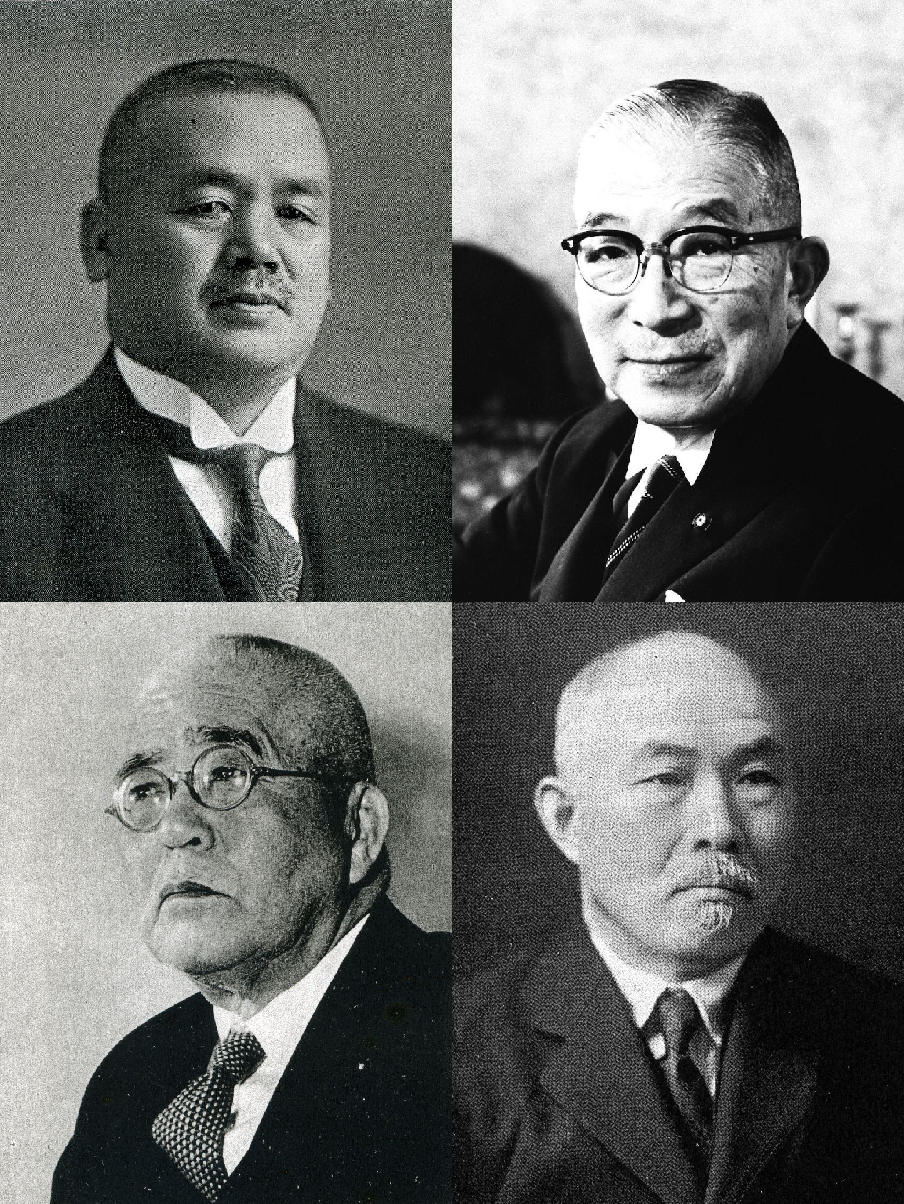

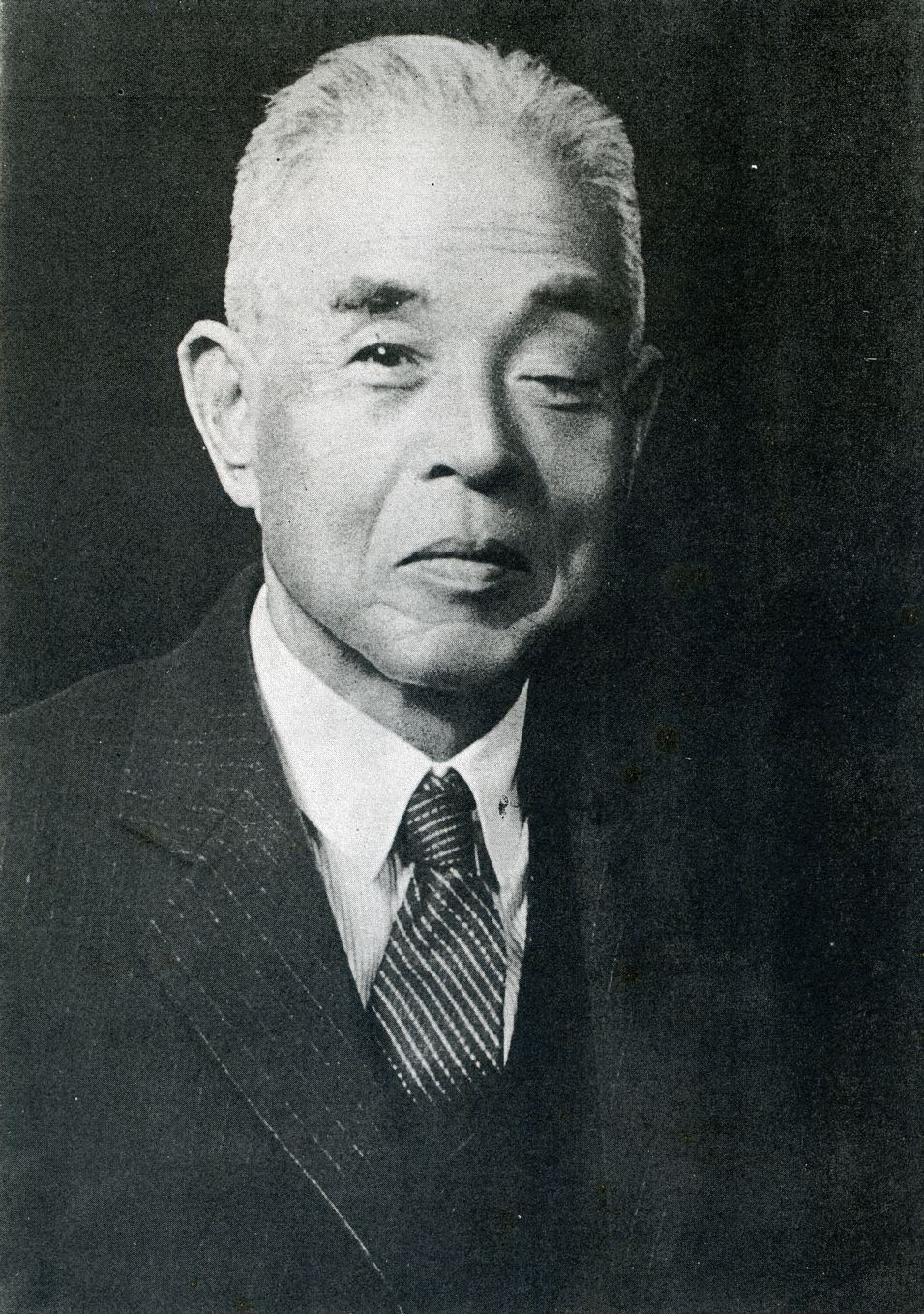

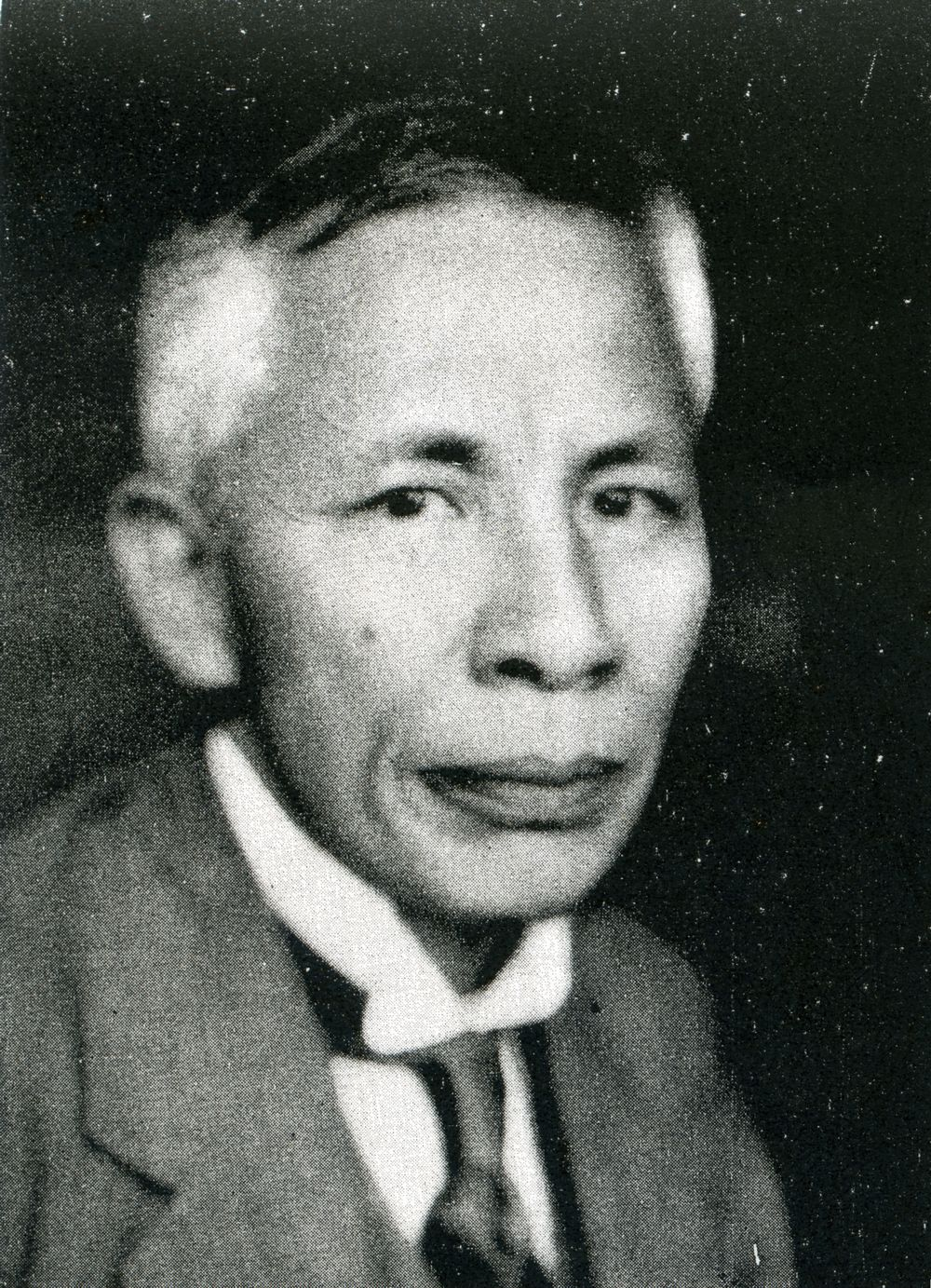

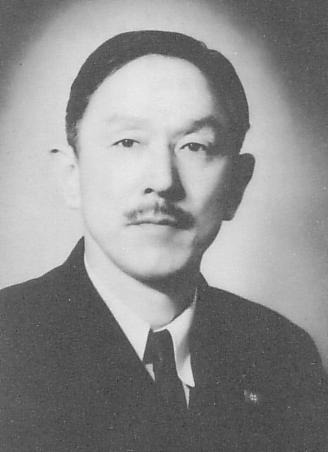
	First party	Second party	Third party
Leader	Machida Chūji	Various (Note: Chikuhei Nakajima, Ichirō Hatoyama, Yonezō Maeda and Toshio Shimada served as acting presidents until April 30, 1939.)	Abe Isoo
Party	Rikken Minseitō	Rikken Seiyūkai	Shakai Taishūtō
Last election	39.92%, 205 seats	37.62%, 174 seats	4.66%, 18 seats
Seats won	179	175	37
Seat change	▼26	▲1	▲19
Popular vote	3,689,355	3,594,863	928,934
Percentage	36.16%	35.23%	9.10%
Swing	▼3.76pp	▲2.39pp	▲4.44pp
	Fourth party	Fifth party	Sixth party
	SWK
Leader	Vacant	Adachi Kenzō	Nakano Seigō
Party	Shōwakai	Kokumin Dōmei	Tōhōkai
Last election	4.78%, 20 seats	3.79%, 15 seats	–
Seats won	18	11	11
Seat change	▼2	▼4	New party
Popular vote	928,934	281,834	221,455
Percentage	4.06%	2.76%	2.17%
Swing	▼0.72pp	▲1.03pp	New party
- Districts shaded according to winners' vote strength
Prime Minister before election
Senjūrō Hayashi
Imperial Japanese Army
Prime Minister after election
Senjūrō Hayashi
Imperial Japanese Army

General elections were held in Japan on 30 April 1937 to elect the 466 members of the House of Representatives, after the dissolution of Parliament on 31 March. Rikken Minseitō emerged as the largest party in Parliament, with 179 of the 466 seats. The election was a major success for Shakai Taishūtō, which became the third-largest party in the Diet, the first socialist party to do so in Japanese history. In contrast, the mildly pro-military Rikken Minseitō lost several seats and fascist groups such as Tōhōkai remained minor forces in the House. Candidates supporting the ruling Hayashi administration were scarce, as his government only obtained endorsement from Shōwakai, Kokumin Dōmei and a coalition of small ultranationalist groups. Prime Minister Hayashi, in face of a hostile House of Representatives, was forced to resign soon after the election. Voter turnout was 73%.

== Background ==
In February 1937 General Senjūrō Hayashi was appointed prime minister. Just days after taking office and having the Diet enact a budget bill, he ordered a dissolution of the House of Representatives, hoping to weaken the major political parties. The act was opposed by the major political parties as well as by the general public, and quickly became known as the "dine and dash dissolution". In turn, both Seiyūkai and Minseitō, along with the Socialists and the fascist group led by Nakano Seigō, campaigned against the government. The ministerial parties, namely Shōwakai (one of its leader joined the cabinet as an Independent) and Kokumin Dōmei, were ill-financed and not able to nominate enough candidates for majority. After Hayashi resigned, Saionji Kinmochi called Konoe Fumimaro to form a new cabinet. From then on, Saionji's influence would be gradually sidelined by Konoe.

In 1941 the Diet under the Konoe government passed a law extending the term of the Representatives from four years to five. This allowed time to solidify the control of the Imperial Rule Assistance Association over Japanese politics. The Association effectively replaced all political parties in Japan and subsequently dominated the 1942 general election, although numerous factions developed within the Association's caucus in the House. The term extension was effectively repealed by the Constitution of Japan in 1947, which returned the representatives' term of office to 4 years.

== Results ==
Party	Votes	%	Seats	+/–
Rikken Minseitō	3,689,355	36.16	179	−26
Rikken Seiyūkai	3,594,863	35.23	175	+1
Shakai Taishūtō	928,934	9.10	37	+19
Shōwakai	414,088	4.06	19	−1
Kokumin Dōmei	281,834	2.76	11	−4
Tōhōkai	221,455	2.17	11	New
Others	1,073,157	10.52	34	0
Total	10,203,686	100.00	466	0
Valid votes	10,203,686	98.89		
Invalid/blank votes	114,116	1.11		
Total votes	10,317,802	100.00		
Registered voters/turnout	14,402,497	71.64		
Source: Mackie & Rose, Voice Japan

=== By prefecture ===
Prefecture	Total seats	Seats won							
Prefecture	Total seats	Rikken Minseitō	Rikken Seiyūkai	Shakai Taishūtō	Shōwakai	Kokumin Dōmei	Tōhōkai	Others	Ind.
Aichi	17	7	4			1	1	1	3
Akita	7	4	2	1					
Aomori	6	3	2				1		
Chiba	11	6	5						
Ehime	9	5	4						
Fukui	5	2	2		1				
Fukuoka	18	5	6	3			1	1	2
Fukushima	11	6	4		1				
Gifu	9	3	4	1			1		
Gunma	9	4	3	1	1				
Hiroshima	13	6	4		3				
Hokkaido	20	10	6		1		1	1	1
Hyōgo	19	7	7	4		1			
Ibaraki	11	3	4		2				2
Ishikawa	6	3	2						1
Iwate	7	2	5						
Kagawa	6	1	3	1					1
Kagoshima	12	2	5	1	2				2
Kanagawa	11	4	5	2					
Kōchi	6	2	2	1			1		
Kumamoto	10	1	5			4			
Kyoto	11	7	3	1					
Mie	9	4	4						1
Miyagi	8	3	3	1	1				
Miyazaki	5	1	1		1		1		1
Nagano	13	6	3	1				2	1
Nagasaki	9	3	4		1		1		
Nara	5	2	2					1	
Niigata	15	8	4	1		2			
Ōita	7	3	4						
Okayama	10	2	6	1	1				
Okinawa	5	2	2			1			
Osaka	21	8	5	6	1				1
Saga	6	3	3						
Saitama	11	3	5	1		1			1
Shiga	5	2	2				1		
Shimane	6	3	3						
Shizuoka	13	5	6	1	1				
Tochigi	9	4	4	1					
Tokushima	6	2	2						2
Tokyo	31	11	8	8				1	3
Tottori	4	2	1		1				
Toyama	6	4	2						
Wakayama	6	2	3						1
Yamagata	8	2	4			1	1		
Yamaguchi	9	1	5		1		1		1
Yamanashi	5	1	1					2	1
Total	466	180	174	37	19	11	11	9	25
