= Constitutional Democratic Party (Japan) =

Political party in Japan (1927–1940)

Constitutional Democratic Party 立憲民政党 Rikken Minseitō
- Leader: Hamaguchi Osachi; Wakatsuki Reijirō; Machida Chūji
- Founded: June 1, 1927
- Dissolved: August 15, 1940
- Preceded by: Kenseikai; Seiyūhontō
- Merged into: Imperial Rule Assistance Association
- Headquarters: Sakurada-cho, Shiba-ku, Tokyo City
- Newspaper: Minsei
- Ideology: Liberalism (Japanese); Progressivism; Liberal conservatism Parliamentarism; Anti-Seiyūkai
- Political position: Centre

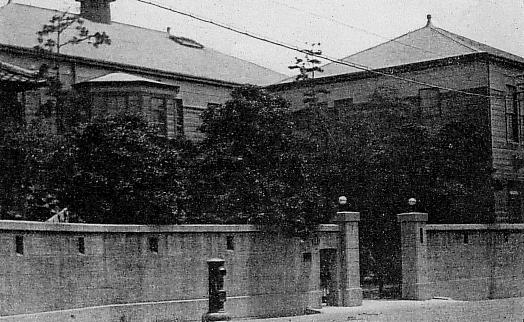
Headquarters of the Rikken Minseitō in Tokyo

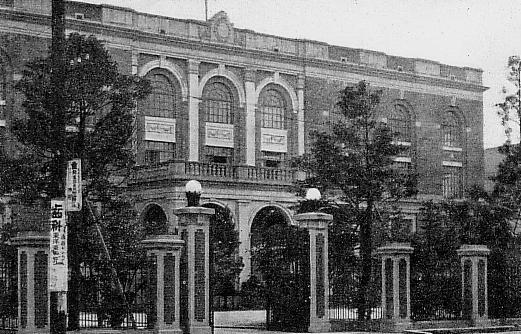
Headquarters of its main rival, the Rikken Seiyūkai

The Constitutional Democratic Party (Japanese: 立憲民政党, Hepburn: Rikken Minseitō) was one of the main political parties in pre-war Empire of Japan. Commonly known as the Minseitō, it was the main rival to the Rikken Seiyūkai.

The party was founded in 1927 as a merger of Kenseikai and the Seiyūhontō political parties. It won 217 seats in the 1928 general election, resulting in a hung parliament. In the 1930 general election, the party won an absolute majority with 273 seats, leading its president Hamaguchi Osachi to become the Prime Minister of Japan. Focusing on economic recovery following the Wall Street crash of 1929, Hamaguchi was assassinated in 1930, leading him to be succeeded by Wakatsuki Reijirō. The party strongly opposed the Mukden incident in 1931, leading Reijirō's government to collapse that year.

The party lost a significant amount of seats in the 1932 general election, which saw the election of Rikken Seiyūkai. It adopted a pro-military stance afterwards, and won a slight plurality of 205 seats in the 1936 general election, resulting in a hung parliament. In the 1937 general election, it dropped to 179 seats, which continued the paralysis in the parliament. In 1940, the party voted to merge itself to the Imperial Rule Assistance Association, which became the sole ruling party of Japan until 1945.

== History ==
The Minseitō was founded on 1 June 1927, by a merger of the Kenseikai and the Seiyūhontō political parties. Its leadership included Hamaguchi Osachi, Wakatsuki Reijirō, Yamamoto Tatsuo, Takejirō Tokonami, Adachi Kenzō, Koizumi Matajirō and Saitō Takao. The party platform was politically and economically more liberal than its major rival, the Rikken Seiyūkai, calling for rule by the Diet of Japan rather than bureaucrats or genrō, elimination of disparities in wealth, international cooperation, and protection of personal liberties.

The Minseitō fielded many candidates in the 1928 general election, (the first to be held after the General Election Law), winning 217 seats in the Lower House, as opposed to 218 seats for the Seiyūkai. This resulted in a hung parliament. In the following 1930 general election, the Minseitō took 273 seats, as opposed to 174 seats for the Seiyūkai, which gave it an absolute majority. Minseitō president Hamaguchi Osachi, Herbert Bix referred to him as Hamaguchi Yūkō, became Prime Minister. Hamaguchi's first priority was to address the effects of the Wall Street crash of 1929 through retrenchment of government spending, tightening the money supply and encouraging exports while stabilizing foreign investments through returning to a fixed exchange rate. During its tenure, the Minseitō also advocated a conciliatory foreign policy and ratified the London Naval Agreement of 1930. However, Hamaguchi fell victim to assassination on 14 November 1930 when he was shot in Tokyo Station by a member of an ultranationalist secret society. Wakatsuki Reijirō became acting Prime Minister, also from the Minseitō.

In 1931, the Minseitō strongly opposed the Mukden incident which was engineered by the Imperial Japanese Army. The anti-war Foreign Minister Kijūrō Shidehara and Prime Minister Reijirō came under strong criticism for their intervention in military affairs and were accused of "serious corruption", and his government collapsed in 1931. In the following 1932 general election, some right-wing members defected to the Rikken Seiyūkai, which won an absolute majority of 301 seats. Seiyūkai president Inukai Tsuyoshi became prime minister. The Minseitō was able to recover a very slight majority of 205 seats versus 175 seats for the Seiyūkai in the 1936 general election only by adopting a more pro-military stance. However, the narrow margin again resulted in a hung parliament. The Minseitō dropped back down to 179 seats in the 1937 general election, while the Seiyūkai retained all of its 175 seats, which continued the paralysis in the Diet of Japan. On 15 August 1940, the Minseitō voted to dissolve itself into the Imperial Rule Assistance Association as part of Fumimaro Konoe's efforts to create a one-party state, and thereafter ceased to exist.

== Party platform ==
1. We should reflect the consensus of the people to the Imperial Diet and thoroughly enforce Parliament-centric politics under the rule of the Emperor.
2. We should thrive in production through national adjustment, make the distribution fair, and remove the cause of social unrest.
3. We should adhere to international justice in diplomatic relations and expand the principles of racial equality and resource disclosure.
4. We should foster character, enlightening imagination, and self-motivated individuality, equalize learning opportunity, and actively promote the realization of education.
5. We should make reorganization that adapt to the momentum for emerging by breaking the anachronistic bad practice that prevailing legislation, administration, and local self-government.

The first article is a text that provides for the politics centered on the House of Representatives so it shows the superiority of the lower house over the upper house.

== Ideology ==
=== Basic philosophy ===
While both the Minseitō and their rivals Rikken Seiyūkai advocated for a constitutional monarchy, the Minseitō held onto a more centrist, liberal and progressive platform than their conservative opposition the Seiyūkai. The Minseitō was established as an anti-Seiyūkai on 1 June 1927. However, the party was really more of a motley collection of politicians who wished to prevent the Seiyūkai from taking power.

Under these circumstances, The Minseitō under the party's first president Hamaguchi. came to advocate 'liberty' and 'progress'. He defined the Minseitō as a progressive party that respected individual liberty and originality. In fact, over time, the Minseitō had grown into a progressive party aiming for freedom and equality in the course of fighting with the Seiyūkai.

=== Gikai Chushin Seiji ===
The Minseitō aimed to establish a two-party system, and the party has advocated "Parliament-centric politics" (議会中心政治, Gikai Chūshin Seiji). This is due to the influence of former members of the Kenseikai legislators who have gained experience as politicians of party politics, and it's an idea to oppose the Seiyūkai which advocates Kōshitsu Chūshinshugi (lit. 'Imperial family centrism'). Seigō Nakano, the head of policymaking and public relations, declared that "The Minseitō will implement strong 'Parliament-centric politics' through good operation of the universal suffrage." The Minseitō was the first political party in Japan to self-styled the "Democratic Party."

== Policies ==
The Minseitō was aimed at incremental democratization in cooperation with bureaucracy organization. Because this party had many party members who were once bureaucrats.

== Organization ==
The headquarters of the Minseitō was in Sakurada-cho, Shiba-ku, Tokyo City. In 1947, Shiba-ku became the current Minato, Tokyo due to the merger with Akasaka-ku and Azabu-ku. Since the political parties at the time were not given corporate status, the land and building owners of the headquarters were not political parties. The owner of the Minseitō Headquarters was Minoura Katsundo, Onimaru Gisai. The party's newspaper was called Minsei.

The intraparty management of the Minseitō was autocracy by executives. The Minseitō legislators had almost monopolized the management positions and the political activities of the party were centered on legislators. The party rules stipulate that executives are publicly elected, but the party had become autocracy by executives because there was a motion at the convention that "It should be left to the president".

=== Membership ===
The Minseitō had professed that it had 2 or 3 million members, however leaders did not know the exact number of members. The party left the certificate for join/leave the party in the warehouse and did not neatly organize the membership list. Additionally, there were also many dual membership and floating members. For that reason, the exact number of the Minseitō is unknown.

Some members who not legislators had formed an organization called Ingaidan (lit. 'Corps outside the parliament'). They essentially worked unpaid for campaigns, escorts, communications, anti-government movements, and election struggles. It's said that there were around 1,300 Ingaidan members in Tokyo Prefecture.

=== Factions ===
In the Minseitō, factions called Kanryōha (lit. 'Bureaucrat faction') and Tōjinha (lit. 'Partisan faction') were in conflict. Kanryōha members were at the center of the Minseitō. They had an overwhelming ability to raise political funds because they were well known in business community such as Mitsubishi zaibatsu. They also had a strong connections to genrō and other privileged classes, so they had high policy-making ability. They were a collection of human resources that could rationalize administration, financial, and tax policies. One more faction, Tōjinha was rallying under Adachi Kenzō who had a good reputation for astute skills in election campaign. Tōjinha members had many politicians who were active in the democratic movements. The younger age group of Tōjinha had a deep connection with a civil groups based on the middle class such as a youth political organization, and formed the left wing of the party that demanded executives to implement populist policies. However, a series of bankruptcies of local banks due to the financial crisis in the 1920s caused the decline of Tōjinha's a financial supporter, local business community. As a result, Tōjinha could not fully oppose Kanryōha.

=== Leaders ===
| No. | Name | Portrait | Term of office | |
| No. | Name | Portrait | Took office | Left office |
|---|---|---|---|---|
| 1 | Hamaguchi Osachi | | 1 June 1927 | 13 April 1931 |
| 2 | Wakatsuki Reijirō | | 13 April 1931 | 1 November 1934 |
| - | Machida Chūji (Interim president) | | 1 November 1934 | 20 January 1935 |
| 3 | Machida Chūji | | 20 January 1935 | 15 August 1940 |

== Election results ==
House of Representatives
| Election year | # of seats | Change | Status |
|---|---|---|---|
| 1928 | 216 / 466 | Steady | Opposition |
| 1930 | 273 / 466 | ▲57 | Government |
| 1932 | 146 / 466 | ▼127 | Opposition |
| 1936 | 205 / 466 | ▲59 | Government |
| 1937 | 179 / 466 | ▼26 | Opposition |
