= Rikken Seiyūkai =

Rikken Seiyūkai 立憲政友会
- Leader: Itō Hirobumi; Saionji Kinmochi; Hara Takashi; Takahashi Korekiyo; Tanaka Giichi; Inukai Tsuyoshi; Suzuki Kisaburō
- Founder: Itō Hirobumi
- Founded: September 15, 1900
- Dissolved: July 30, 1940
- Merger of: Kenseitō; Teikokutō (factions); Kakushin Club (factions, 1925)
- Merged into: Imperial Rule Assistance Association
- Succeeded by: Seiyūhontō (Mainstream faction, 1924, via Shinsei Club); Shōwakai (pro-Tokonami faction, 1935)
- Headquarters: Tokyo City
- Newspaper: Seiyūkai; Chuo Shimbun (ja)
- Ideology: Conservatism (Japanese); Liberal conservatism Modified capitalism Monarchism; Anti-particracy; Faction: Gradualist economics Keynesianism
- Political position: Centre-right to right-wing

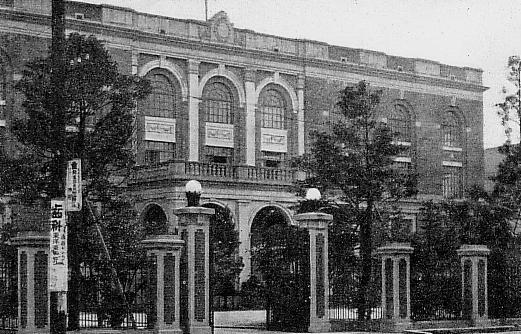
Rikken Seiyūkai HQ, circa 1930

The Rikken Seiyūkai (立憲政友会; Association of Friends of Constitutional Government) was one of the main political parties in the pre-war Empire of Japan. It was also known simply as the Seiyūkai.

The party was founded in 1900 by Itō Hirobumi as a pro-government alliance of bureaucrats and former members of the Kenseitō. It came to power in the same year when Itō became the Prime Minister. It was the most powerful political party in the House of Representatives from 1900 to 1921. After the assassination of party leader and Prime Minister Hara Takashi in 1921, a large part of the party defected to form the Seiyūhontō in the 1924 general election, leading the party to lose a significant amount of seats. It regained a very slight plurality of 217 seats in the 1928 general election, resulting in a hung parliament.

The party was reduced to 174 seats in the 1930 general election, which led to the formation of a Constitutional Democratic Party-led government. It won the 1932 general election with 310 seats, leading its leader Inukai Tsuyoshi to become Prime Minister; Inukai was later assassinated in the May 15 incident in 1932. The party was again reduced to 174 seats in the 1936 general election, later winning 175 seats in the 1937 general election. In 1940, the party voted to merge itself to the Imperial Rule Assistance Association, which became the sole ruling party of Japan until 1945.

== History ==
Founded on September 15, 1900, by Itō Hirobumi, the Seiyūkai was a pro-government alliance of bureaucrats and former members of the Kenseitō. The Seiyūkai was the most powerful political party in the House of Representatives of the Diet of Japan from 1900 to 1921, and it promoted big government and large-scale public spending. Though labeled "liberal" by its own members, it was generally conservative by modern definitions. It often opposed social reforms and it supported bureaucratic control and militarism to win votes. It viewed the Constitutional Democratic Party as its main rival.

The Seiyūkai came into power in October 1900 under the 4th Itō administration. Under its second leader, Saionji Kinmochi, it participated in the Movement to Protect Constitutional Government from 1912 to 1913. It was the ruling party under the Prime Minister Yamamoto Gonnohyōe from 1913 to 1914. Cabinet minister (and later 4th party president) Takahashi Korekiyo helped reinforce its ties with the zaibatsu, especially the Mitsui financial interests.

The 3rd party president, Hara Takashi, became Prime Minister in September 1918, and assigned every cabinet post except for the Army Minister, Navy Minister and Minister of Foreign Affairs to members of the Seiyūkai. In 1920, the party reached the peak of its popularity.

After Hara's assassination in 1921, a large block of party members defected to form the Seiyūhontō in the 1924 general election; however, the Seiyūkai retained enough seats to dominate the cabinet of its 5th party president, General Tanaka Giichi from 1927 to 1929.

While in the opposition during the Minseitō-dominated cabinet of Prime Minister Hamaguchi Osachi, the Seiyūkai attacked the ratification of the London Naval Treaty of 1930 as against Article 11 of the Meiji Constitution, which stipulated the independence of the military from civilian control.

After winning the 1932 general election under Inukai Tsuyoshi, Seiyūkai formed a cabinet, floated the yen and conducted policies to revive the economy. However, after Inukai’s assassination in the May 15 incident of 1932, factionism within the party limited its effectiveness.

In 1940, it voted to dissolve itself into the Imperial Rule Assistance Association as part of Fumimaro Konoe's efforts to create a one-party state, and thereafter ceased to exist. Ichirō Hatoyama, who had been a Seiyūkai member of the House of Representatives, led some former party members into the 1945 Liberal Party.

== Factions ==
Orthodox faction - also known as the Kuhara faction (centered around Hatoyama, Kuhara, Mitsudo, Yoshizawa, and Takuji Hida).

Reformist faction - also known as the Nakajima faction, formally known as the Rikken Seiyukai Reform Alliance (centered around Nakajima, Maeda, Shimada, Tanabe Shichiro, and Togo Makoto).

Neutral - Konko faction (Konko, Inukai, Ota, etc. at the center). Developed into the unification faction.

== Election results ==
Election	Votes	%	Seats	+/–
1902	433,763	50.40%	191 / 376	Steady
1903	373,022	45.42	175 / 376	▼16
1904	217,691	33.47	133 / 379	▼42
1908	649,858	48.40	187 / 379	▲54
1912	689,613	51.52	209 / 381	▲22
1915	446,934	31.54	108 / 381	▼101
1917	504,720	38.80	165 / 381	▲57
1920	1,471,728	55.77	278 / 464	▲113
1924	666,317	22.41	103 / 464	▼175
1928	4,244,385	43.06%	217 / 466	▲114
1930	3,925,980	37.69	174 / 466	▼43
1932	5,683,137	58.20	301 / 466	▲127
1936	4,188,029	37.62	174 / 466	▼127
1937	3,594,863	35.23	175 / 466	▲1
