= Okada Keisuke =

Japanese admiral, prime minister from 1934 to 1936

Senior Second Rank Okada Keisuke
- 岡田 啓介
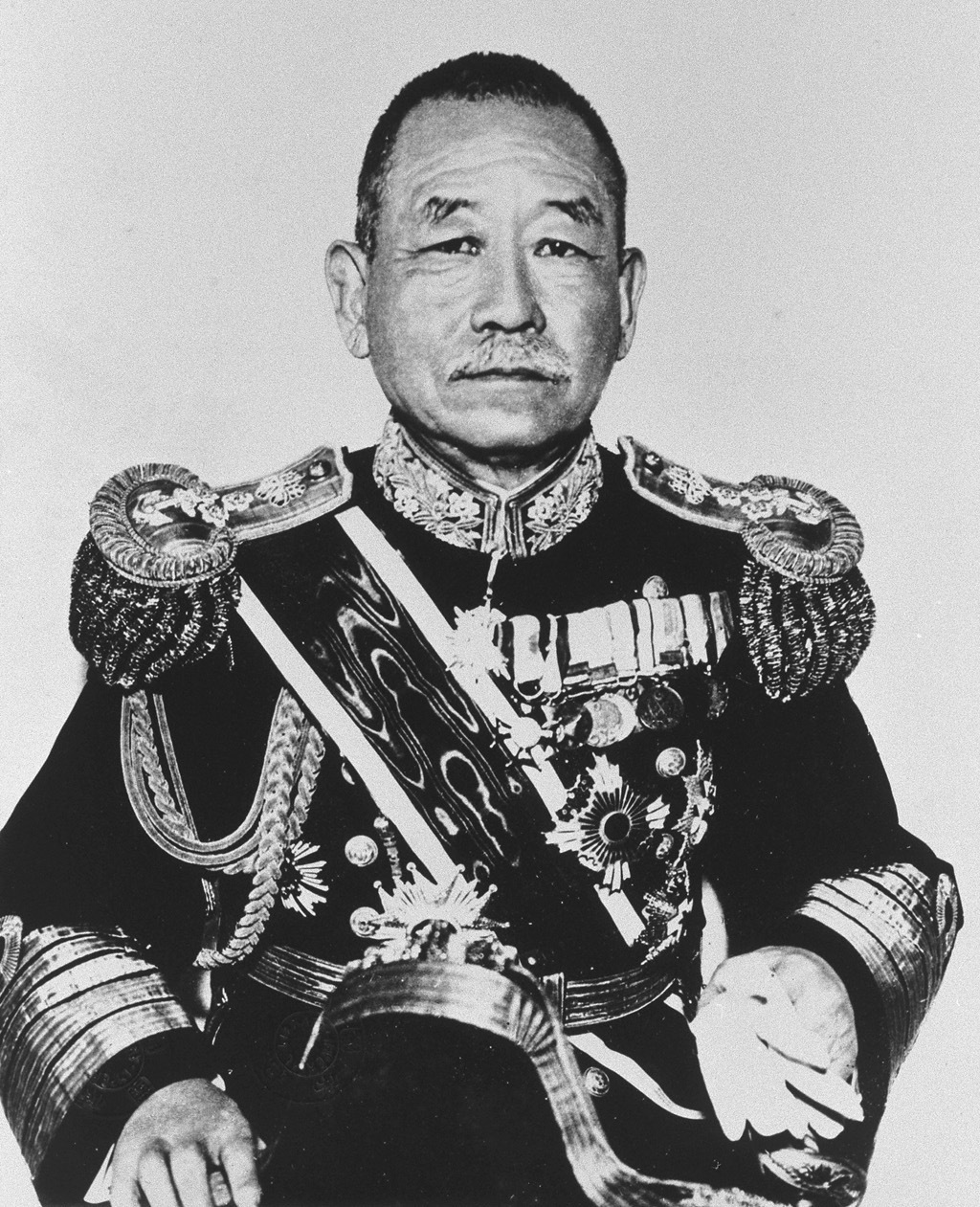
- Okada in c. 1934–1935

Prime Minister of Japan
- In office 8 July 1934 – 9 March 1936 (Note: Briefly presumed dead during the February 26 incident. Gotō Fumio served as acting prime minister from 26 February 1936 to 29 February 1936)
- Monarch: Hirohito
- Preceded by: Saitō Makoto
- Succeeded by: Hirota Kōki

Ministry of Communications
- In office 9 September 1935 – 12 September 1935
- Prime Minister: Himself
- Preceded by: Tokonami Takejirō
- Succeeded by: Mochizuki Keisuke

Minister of Colonial Affairs
- In office 8 July 1934 – 25 October 1934
- Prime Minister: Himself
- Preceded by: Nagai Ryūtarō
- Succeeded by: Hideo Kodama

Minister of the Navy
- In office 26 May 1932 – 9 January 1933
- Prime Minister: Saitō Makoto
- Preceded by: Ōsumi Mineo
- Succeeded by: Ōsumi Mineo
- In office 20 April 1927 – 2 July 1929
- Prime Minister: Tanaka Giichi
- Preceded by: Takarabe Takeshi
- Succeeded by: Takarabe Takeshi

Personal details
- Born: 20 January 1868 Asuwa, Fukui, Japan
- Died: 7 October 1952 (aged 84) Setagaya, Tokyo, Japan
- Resting place: Tama Cemetery
- Party: Independent
- Relatives: Hisatsune Sakomizu (son-in-law)
- Education: Imperial Japanese Naval Academy
- Profession: Admiral

Okada Keisuke (Japanese: 岡田 啓介; 20 January 1868 – 7 October 1952) was a Japanese admiral and statesman who served as Prime Minister of Japan from 1934 to 1936.

Born to a samurai family in the Fukui Domain, Okada became an officer in the Imperial Japanese Navy and served during the First Sino-Japanese War and the Russo-Japanese War. After reaching the rank of Admiral, he served as minister of the navy under Prime Minister Tanaka Giichi from 1927 to 1929 and under Prime Minister Saitō Makoto from 1932 to 1933.

Okada was appointed prime minister to succeed Saito in 1934. A moderate who attempted to restrain the rise of militarism, Okada was among those targeted by a group of rebel officers in the February 26 incident of 1936. Okada narrowly survived, but resigned in the aftermath of the incident.

As a senior statesman during the Pacific War, Okada was a central figure in efforts to oust Prime Minister Hideki Tojo and seek peace with the Allies.

== Early life and education ==
Okada was born on 20 January 1868, in Fukui Prefecture, the son of a samurai of the Fukui Domain. He attended the 15th class of the Imperial Japanese Naval Academy, graduating 7th out of a class of 80 cadets in 1889.

== Military career ==
Okada served as a midshipman on the ironclad warship Kongō and the cruiser Naniwa. He was commissioned an ensign on 9 July 1890. He later served as lieutenant on the Itsukushima and Takachiho as well as the corvette Hiei.

In the First Sino-Japanese War, Okada served on the Fuji. After his graduation from the Naval Staff College, he subsequently served on the Shikishima and as executive officer on the Yaeyama. He was promoted to lieutenant on 9 December 1894, to lieutenant commander on 29 September 1899 and to commander on 13 July 1904.

During the Russo-Japanese War, Okada served as executive officer on a successor of vessels, including the Chitose, Kasuga and Asahi. He was promoted to captain on 25 September 1908 and given his own command, the Kasuga on 25 July 1910. He later transferred to the Kashima in 1912.

Promoted to rear admiral on 1 December 1913, Okada served in a number of desk jobs thereafter, including that of the Naval Shipbuilding Command. He was promoted to vice admiral on 1 December 1917 and to full admiral on 11 June 1924.

Okada assumed the post of commander-in-chief of the Combined Fleet in 1924. In 1927, he became Minister of Navy in the administration of Tanaka Giichi, but resigned in 1929 to assume the post of military councillor on the Supreme War Council.

Okada was one of the few supporters (Treaty Faction) within the upper ranks of the Imperial Japanese Navy of the arms reduction treaty resulting from the London Naval Treaty of 1930, which he helped negotiate and worked hard for its ratification. He again served as Navy Minister in the Saitō Makoto cabinet of 1932.

Okada entered the reserves on 21 January 1933 and retired five years later.

== Premiership (1934–1936) ==
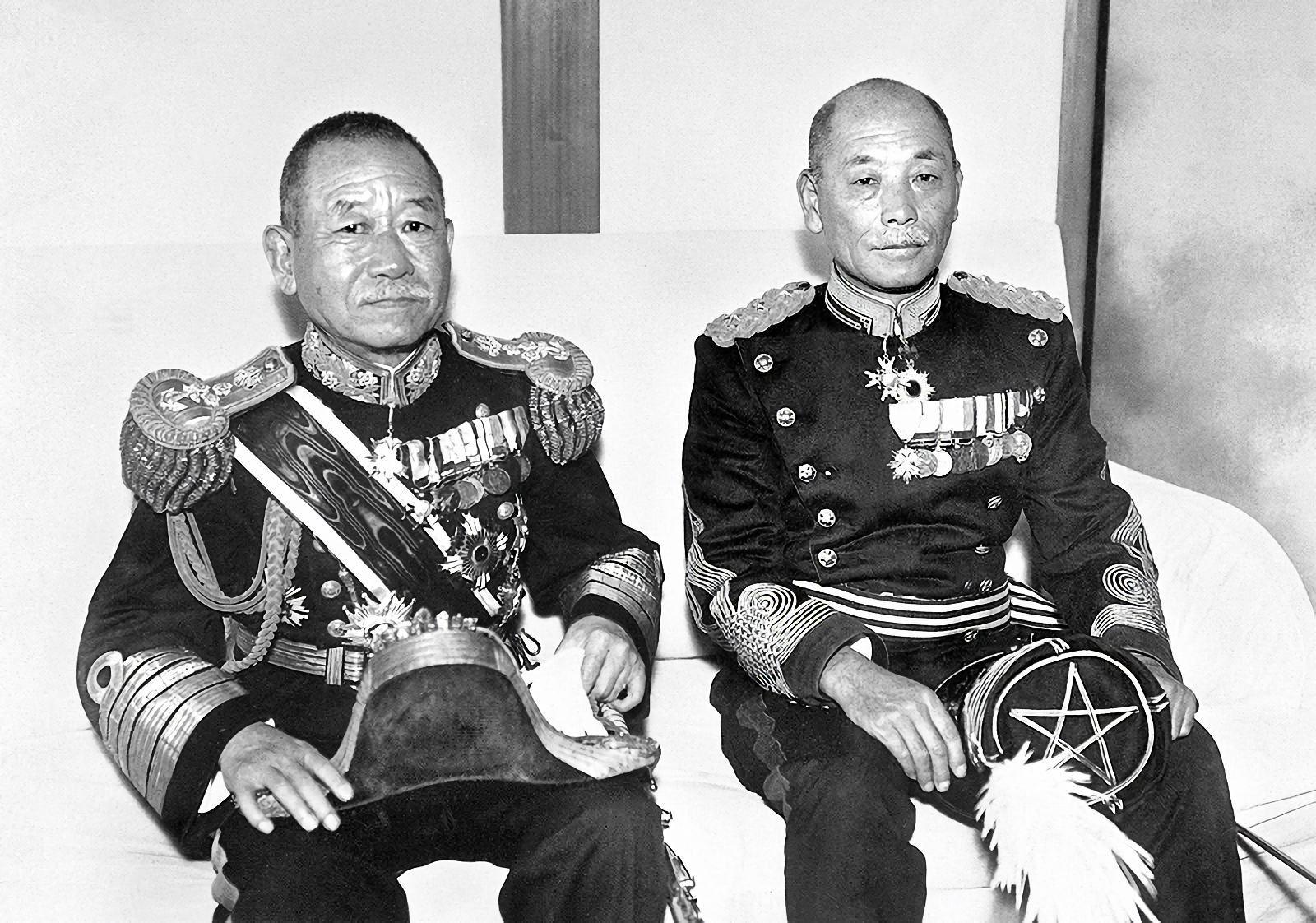
Okada (left) and Denzō Matsuo

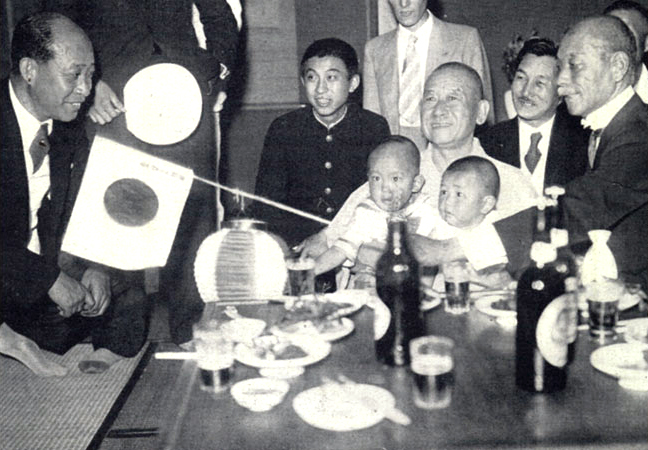
Okada with his family celebrating his inauguration as prime minister, 13 July 1934

In July 1934, Okada was named Prime Minister of Japan holding simultaneously the portfolio of Minister of Colonial Affairs. In the month of September 1935, he also briefly held the portfolio of Minister of Post and Telecommunications. Okada was one of the democratic and moderate voices against the increasing strength of the militarists, and was therefore a major target for extremist forces pushing for a more totalitarian Japan. He narrowly escaped assassination in the February 26 Incident of 1936, largely because rebel troops killed Colonel Denzō Matsuo, brother-in-law as well as personal secretary of Okada's, by misidentifying him as the prime minister. Okada emerged from hiding on 29 February 1936. However, he left office a few days later.

== Later life ==
Okada was adamant in his opposition to the war with the United States. During World War II, Okada formed a group of like-minded politicians and military officers seeking an early end to the hostilities. After the defeat of Japanese forces at the Battle of Midway and Battle of Guadalcanal, Okada pushed for negotiations with the Allies, and played a leading role in the overthrow of the Tōjō Hideki cabinet in 1944.

Okada died in 1952, and his grave is at the Tama Cemetery, in Fuchū, Tokyo.

== Honors ==
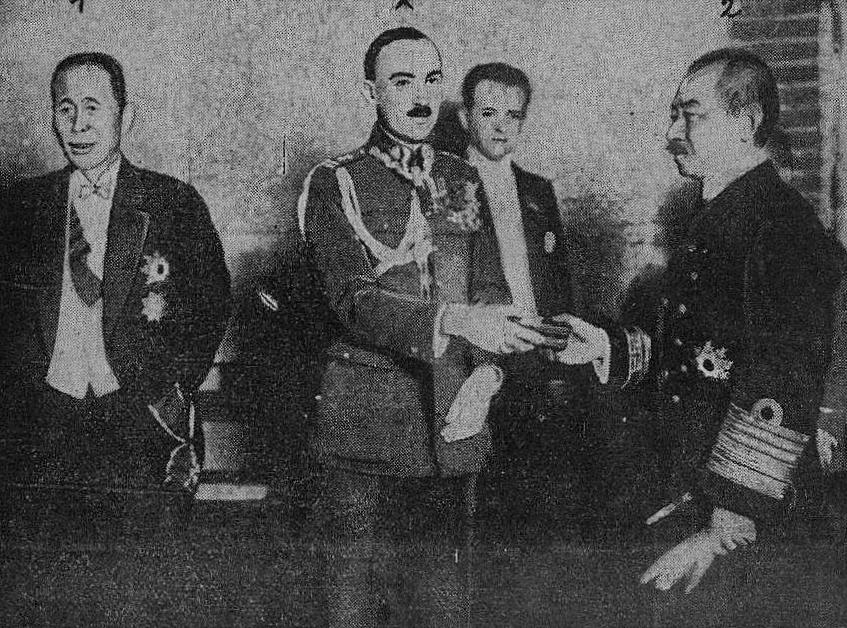
Podpułkownik Wacław Jędrzejewicz awards Admiral Okada Keisuke with VMs in 1928

From the corresponding article in the Japanese Wikipedia

- Order of the Golden Kite, (3rd class) (1915)
- Grand Cordon of the Order of the Rising Sun (1920)
- Grand Cordon of the Order of the Paulownia Flowers (1933)
- Knight's Cross of the War Order of Virtuti Militari (No. 128) (Poland, 1928)
- Golden Cross of the War Order of Virtuti Militari (No. 539) (Poland, 1928)

== See also ==
- Okada Cabinet

== Notes ==
Political offices
Preceded by Ide Kenji	Vice-Minister of the Navy; 25 May 1923 - 11 June 1924	Succeeded by Abo Kiyokazu
Military offices
Preceded by Kantarō Suzuki	Combined Fleet & 1st Fleet; Commander-in-chief; 1 December 1924 – 10 December 1926	Succeeded by Katō Hiroharu
Preceded by Katō Hiroharu	Yokosuka Naval District; Commander-in-chief; 10 December 1926 – 20 April 1927	Succeeded by Abo Kiyokazu
Political offices
Preceded by Takarabe Takeshi	Minister of the Navy; 20 April 1927 – 2 July 1929	Succeeded by Takarabe Takeshi
Preceded by Ōsumi Mineo	Minister of the Navy; 26 May 1932 – 9 January 1933	Succeeded by Ōsumi Mineo
Preceded by Ryūtarō Nagai	Minister of Colonial Affairs; July 1934 – October 1934	Succeeded by Hideo Kodama
Preceded by Takejirō Tokonami	Minister of Communications; September 1935 – September 1935	Succeeded by Keisuke Mochizuki
Preceded by Saitō Makoto	Prime Minister; 8 July 1934 – 9 March 1936	Succeeded by Fumio Gotō; Acting
Preceded by Fumio Gotō; Acting	Prime Minister; 1936	Succeeded by Kōki Hirota
