= Katō Takaaki cabinet =

Cabinet of Japan (1924–1926)

Katō Takaaki Cabinet
- 24th Cabinet of Japan

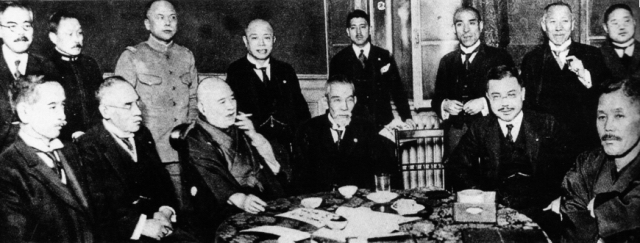
- Date formed: June 11, 1924
- Date dissolved: January 30, 1926

People and organisations
- Emperor: Taishō
- Prime Minister: Katō Takaaki (until January 28, 1926); Wakatsuki Reijirō (acting) (January 28 – January 30, 1926)

History
- Legislature terms: 49th Imperial Diet; 50th Imperial Diet; 51st Imperial Diet
- Predecessor: Kiyoura Cabinet
- Successor: First Wakatsuki Cabinet

The Katō Takaaki Cabinet is the 24th Cabinet of Japan led by Katō Takaaki from June 11, 1924 to January 30, 1926.

== Cabinet ==
Ministers
Portfolio	Name	Political party	Term start	Term end
Prime Minister	Viscount Katō Takaaki	Kenseikai	June 11, 1924	January 28, 1926
Minister for Foreign Affairs	Baron Shidehara Kijūrō	Independent	June 11, 1924	January 28, 1926
Minister of Home Affairs	Wakatsuki Reijirō	Kenseikai	June 11, 1924	January 28, 1926
Minister of Finance	Hamaguchi Osachi	Kenseikai	June 11, 1924	January 28, 1926
Minister of the Army	Ugaki Kazushige	Military (Army)	June 11, 1924	January 28, 1926
Minister of the Navy	Takarabe Takeshi	Military (Navy)	June 11, 1924	January 28, 1926
Minister of Justice	Yokota Sennosuke	Rikken Seiyūkai	June 11, 1924	February 5, 1925
Minister of Justice	Takahashi Korekiyo (acting)	Rikken Seiyūkai	February 5, 1925	February 9. 1925
Minister of Justice	Ogawa Heikichi	Rikken Seiyūkai	February 9. 1925	August 2, 1925
Minister of Education	Okada Ryōhei	Independent	June 11, 1924	January 28, 1926
Minister of Agriculture and Commerce	Takahashi Korekiyo	Rikken Seiyūkai	June 11, 1924	April 1, 1925
Minister of Agriculture, Forestry and Fisheries	Takahashi Korekiyo	Rikken Seiyūkai	April 1, 1925	April 17, 1925
Minister of Agriculture, Forestry and Fisheries	Okazaki Kunisuke	Rikken Seiyūkai	April 17, 1925	August 2, 1925
Minister of Commerce and Industry	Takahashi Korekiyo	Rikken Seiyūkai	April 1, 1925	April 17, 1925
Minister of Commerce and Industry	Noda Utarō	Rikken Seiyūkai	April 17, 1925	August 2, 1925
Minister of Communications	Inukai Tsuyoshi	Kakushin Club	June 11, 1924	May 30, 1925
Minister of Communications	Adachi Kenzō	Kenseikai	May 30, 1925	January 28, 1926
Minister of Railways	Sengoku Mitsugu	Kenseikai	June 11, 1924	January 28, 1926
Chief Cabinet Secretary	Egi Tasuku	Seiyūhontō	June 11, 1924	August 2, 1925
Director-General of the Cabinet Legislation Bureau	Tsukamoto Seiji	Independent	June 11, 1924	August 2, 1925
Parliamentary Vice-Ministers
Portfolio	Name	Political party	Term start	Term end
Parliamentary Vice-Minister for Foreign Affairs	Nakamura Takashi	Rikken Seiyūkai	August 12, 1924	August 10, 1925
Parliamentary Vice-Minister of Home Affairs	Kataoka Naoharu	Kenseikai	August 12, 1924	August 10, 1925
Parliamentary Vice-Minister of Finance	Hayami Seiji	Kenseikai	August 12, 1924	August 10, 1925
Parliamentary Vice-Minister of the Army	Seki Wachi	Kenseikai	August 12, 1924	February 18, 1925
Parliamentary Vice-Minister of the Army	Vacant		February 18, 1925	April 20, 1925
Parliamentary Vice-Minister of the Army	Furuhata Mototaro	Kenseikai	April 20, 1925	August 10, 1925
Parliamentary Vice-Minister of the Navy	Hata Toyosuke	Rikken Seiyūkai	August 12, 1924	April 20, 1925
Parliamentary Vice-Minister of the Navy	Takeuchi Sakuhei	Kenseikai	April 20, 1925	August 10, 1925
Parliamentary Vice-Minister of Justice	Naota Kumagaya	Rikken Seiyūkai	August 12, 1924	August 10, 1925
Parliamentary Vice-Minister of Education	Suzuoki Kurajirō	Kenseikai	August 12, 1924	January 28, 1926
Parliamentary Vice-Minister of Agriculture and Commerce	Mitsuchi Chūzō	Rikken Seiyūkai	August 12, 1924	April 1, 1925
Parliamentary Vice-Minister of Agriculture, Forestry and Fisheries	Mitsuchi Chūzō	Rikken Seiyūkai	April 1, 1925	August 3, 1925
Parliamentary Vice-Minister of Commerce and Industry	Vacant		April 1, 1925	April 20, 1925
Parliamentary Vice-Minister of Commerce and Industry	Hata Toyosuke	Rikken Seiyūkai	April 20, 1925	August 10, 1925
Parliamentary Vice-Minister of Communications	Kojima Kazuo	Rikken Seiyūkai	August 12, 1924	June 1, 1925
Parliamentary Vice-Minister of Communications	Tanomogi Keikichi	Kenseikai	June 1, 1925	January 28, 1926
Parliamentary Vice-Minister of Railways	Magoichi Tawara	Kenseikai	August 12, 1924	August 10, 1925
Parliamentary Counsellors
Portfolio	Name	Political party	Term start	Term end
Parliamentary Counsellor for Foreign Affairs	Nagai Ryūtarō	Kenseikai	August 12, 1924	January 28, 1926
Parliamentary Counsellor of Home Affairs	Suzuki Fujiya	Kenseikai	August 12, 1924	January 28, 1926
Parliamentary Counsellor of Finance	Miki Bukichi	Kenseikai	August 12, 1924	January 28, 1926
Parliamentary Counsellor of the Army	Kawasaki Katsu	Kenseikai	August 12, 1924	August 10, 1925
Parliamentary Counsellor of the Navy	Sugawara Den	Rikken Seiyūkai	August 12, 1924	August 10, 1925
Parliamentary Counsellor of Justice	Iwasaki Kōjirō	Rikken Seiyūkai	August 12, 1924	August 10, 1925
Parliamentary Counsellor of Education	Kawakami Tetsuta	Rikken Seiyūkai	August 12, 1924	August 10, 1925
Parliamentary Counsellor of Agriculture and Commerce	Horikiri Zenbee	Rikken Seiyūkai	August 12, 1924	April 1, 1925
Parliamentary Counsellor of Agriculture, Forestry and Fisheries	Vacant		April 1, 1925	April 20, 1925
Parliamentary Counsellor of Agriculture, Forestry and Fisheries	Kurozumi Nariaki	Rikken Seiyūkai	April 20, 1925	August 10, 1925
Parliamentary Counsellor of Commerce and Industry	Horikiri Zenbee	Rikken Seiyūkai	April 1, 1925	April 20, 1925
Parliamentary Counsellor of Commerce and Industry	Nomura Karoku	Kenseikai	April 20, 1925	January 28, 1926
Parliamentary Counsellor of Communications	Uehara Etsujirō	Kakushin Club	August 12, 1924	August 10, 1925
Parliamentary Counsellor of Railways	Furuya Yoshitaka	Kenseikai	August 12, 1924	January 28, 1926

== Reshuffled Cabinet ==
A Cabinet reshuffle took place on August 2, 1925.

Ministers
Portfolio	Name	Political party	Term start	Term end
Prime Minister	Viscount Katō Takaaki	Kenseikai	June 11, 1924	January 28, 1926
Minister for Foreign Affairs	Baron Shidehara Kijūrō	Independent	June 11, 1924	January 28, 1926
Minister of Home Affairs	Wakatsuki Reijirō	Kenseikai	June 11, 1924	January 28, 1926
Minister of Finance	Hamaguchi Osachi	Kenseikai	June 11, 1924	January 28, 1926
Minister of the Army	Ugaki Kazushige	Military (Army)	June 11, 1924	January 28, 1926
Minister of the Navy	Takarabe Takeshi	Military (Navy)	June 11, 1924	January 28, 1926
Minister of Justice	Egi Tasuku	Kenseikai	August 2, 1925	January 28, 1926
Minister of Education	Okada Ryōhei	Independent	June 11, 1924	January 28, 1926
Minister of Agriculture, Forestry and Fisheries	Hayami Seiji	Kenseikai	August 2, 1925	January 28, 1926
Minister of Commerce and Industry	Kataoka Naoharu	Kenseikai	August 2, 1925	January 28, 1926
Minister of Communications	Adachi Kenzō	Kenseikai	May 30, 1925	January 28, 1926
Minister of Railways	Sengoku Mitsugu	Kenseikai	June 11, 1924	January 28, 1926
Chief Cabinet Secretary	Tsukamoto Seiji	Independent	August 2, 1925	January 28, 1926
Director-General of the Cabinet Legislation Bureau	Vacant		August 2, 1925	August 10, 1925
Director-General of the Cabinet Legislation Bureau	Yamakawa Tadao	Independent	August 10, 1925	January 28, 1926
Parliamentary Vice-Ministers
Portfolio	Name	Political party	Term start	Term end
Parliamentary Vice-Minister for Foreign Affairs	Nakamura Takashi	Rikken Seiyūkai	August 12, 1924	August 10, 1925
Parliamentary Vice-Minister for Foreign Affairs	Baron Yabuki Shōzō	Independent	August 10, 1925	January 28, 1926
Parliamentary Vice-Minister of Home Affairs	Kataoka Naoharu	Kenseikai	August 12, 1924	August 10, 1925
Parliamentary Vice-Minister of Home Affairs	Magoichi Tawara	Kenseikai	August 10, 1925	January 28, 1926
Parliamentary Vice-Minister of Finance	Hayami Seiji	Kenseikai	August 12, 1924	August 10, 1925
Parliamentary Vice-Minister of Finance	Takeuchi Sakuhei	Kenseikai	August 10, 1925	January 28, 1926
Parliamentary Vice-Minister of the Army	Furuhata Mototaro	Kenseikai	April 20, 1925	August 10, 1925
Parliamentary Vice-Minister of the Army	Viscount Mizuno Naoshi	Independent	August 10, 1925	January 28, 1926
Parliamentary Vice-Minister of the Navy	Takeuchi Sakuhei	Kenseikai	April 20, 1925	August 10, 1925
Parliamentary Vice-Minister of the Navy	Viscount Inoue Tadashirō	Independent	August 10, 1925	January 28, 1926
Parliamentary Vice-Minister of Justice	Kumagaya Naota	Rikken Seiyūkai	August 12, 1924	August 10, 1925
Parliamentary Vice-Minister of Justice	Honda Tsuneyuki	Kenseikai	August 10, 1925	January 28, 1926
Parliamentary Vice-Minister of Education	Suzuoki Kurajirō	Kenseikai	August 12, 1924	January 28, 1926
Parliamentary Vice-Minister of Agriculture, Forestry and Fisheries	Mitsuchi Chūzō	Rikken Seiyūkai	April 1, 1925	August 3, 1925
Parliamentary Vice-Minister of Agriculture, Forestry and Fisheries	Vacant		August 3, 1925	August 10, 1925
Parliamentary Vice-Minister of Agriculture, Forestry and Fisheries	Koyama Shoju	Rikken Seiyūkai	August 10, 1925	January 28, 1926
Parliamentary Vice-Minister of Commerce and Industry	Hata Toyosuke	Rikken Seiyūkai	April 20, 1925	August 10, 1925
Parliamentary Vice-Minister of Commerce and Industry	Sakurai Gunnosuke	Kenseikai	August 10, 1925	January 28, 1926
Parliamentary Vice-Minister of Communications	Tanomogi Keikichi	Kenseikai	June 1, 1925	January 28, 1926
Parliamentary Vice-Minister of Railways	Magoichi Tawara	Kenseikai	August 12, 1924	August 10, 1925
Parliamentary Vice-Minister of Railways	Furuhata Mototaro	Kenseikai	August 10, 1925	January 28, 1926
Parliamentary Counsellors
Portfolio	Name	Political party	Term start	Term end
Parliamentary Counsellor for Foreign Affairs	Nagai Ryūtarō	Kenseikai	August 12, 1924	January 28, 1926
Parliamentary Counsellor of Home Affairs	Suzuki Fujiya	Kenseikai	August 12, 1924	January 28, 1926
Parliamentary Counsellor of Finance	Miki Bukichi	Kenseikai	August 12, 1924	January 28, 1926
Parliamentary Counsellor of the Army	Kawasaki Katsu	Kenseikai	August 12, 1924	August 10, 1925
Parliamentary Counsellor of the Army	Count Mizoguchi Naoyoshi	Independent	August 10, 1925	January 28, 1926
Parliamentary Counsellor of the Navy	Sugawara Den	Rikken Seiyūkai	August 12, 1924	August 10, 1925
Parliamentary Counsellor of the Navy	Viscount Itō Jiromaru	Independent	August 10, 1925	January 28, 1926
Parliamentary Counsellor of Justice	Iwasaki Kōjirō	Rikken Seiyūkai	August 12, 1924	August 10, 1925
Parliamentary Counsellor of Justice	Yatsunami Takeji	Kenseikai	August 10, 1925	January 28, 1926
Parliamentary Counsellor of Education	Kawakami Tetsuta	Rikken Seiyūkai	August 12, 1924	August 10, 1925
Parliamentary Counsellor of Education	Yamaji Jōichi	Kenseikai	August 10, 1925	January 28, 1926
Parliamentary Counsellor of Agriculture, Forestry and Fisheries	Vacant		April 1, 1925	April 20, 1925
Parliamentary Counsellor of Agriculture, Forestry and Fisheries	Kurozumi Nariaki	Rikken Seiyūkai	April 20, 1925	August 10, 1925
Parliamentary Counsellor of Agriculture, Forestry and Fisheries	Takada Yohei	Kenseikai	August 10, 1925	January 28, 1926
Parliamentary Counsellor of Commerce and Industry	Horikiri Zenbee	Rikken Seiyūkai	April 1, 1925	April 20, 1925
Parliamentary Counsellor of Commerce and Industry	Nomura Karoku	Kenseikai	April 20, 1925	January 28, 1926
Parliamentary Counsellor of Communications	Uehara Etsujirō	Kakushin Club	August 12, 1924	August 10, 1925
Parliamentary Counsellor of Communications	Kawasaki Katsu	Kenseikai	August 10, 1925	January 28, 1926
Parliamentary Counsellor of Railways	Furuya Yoshitaka	Kenseikai	August 12, 1924	January 28, 1926

Following Katō's death on January 28, 1926, Wakatsuki Reijirō became acting Prime Minister from January 28 to 30, 1926.

Ministers
Portfolio	Name	Political party	Term start	Term end
Prime Minister	Wakatsuki Reijirō (acting)	Kenseikai	January 28, 1926	January 30, 1926
Minister for Foreign Affairs	Baron Shidehara Kijūrō	Independent	January 28, 1926	January 30, 1926
Minister of Home Affairs	Wakatsuki Reijirō	Kenseikai	January 28, 1926	January 30, 1926
Minister of Finance	Hamaguchi Osachi	Kenseikai	January 28, 1926	January 30, 1926
Minister of the Army	Ugaki Kazushige	Military (Army)	January 28, 1926	January 30, 1926
Minister of the Navy	Takarabe Takeshi	Military (Navy)	January 28, 1926	January 30, 1926
Minister of Justice	Egi Tasuku	Kenseikai	January 28, 1926	January 30, 1926
Minister of Education	Okada Ryōhei	Independent	January 28, 1926	January 30, 1926
Minister of Agriculture, Forestry and Fisheries	Hayami Seiji	Kenseikai	January 28, 1926	January 30, 1926
Minister of Commerce and Industry	Kataoka Naoharu	Kenseikai	January 28, 1926	January 30, 1926
Minister of Communications	Adachi Kenzō	Kenseikai	January 28, 1926	January 30, 1926
Minister of Railways	Sengoku Mitsugu	Kenseikai	January 28, 1926	January 30, 1926
Chief Cabinet Secretary	Tsukamoto Seiji	Independent	January 28, 1926	January 30, 1926
Director-General of the Cabinet Legislation Bureau	Vacant		January 28, 1926	January 30, 1926
Director-General of the Cabinet Legislation Bureau	Yamakawa Tadao	Independent	January 28, 1926	January 30, 1926
Parliamentary Vice-Ministers
Portfolio	Name	Political party	Term start	Term end
Parliamentary Vice-Minister for Foreign Affairs	Baron Yabuki Shōzō	Independent	January 28, 1926	January 30, 1926
Parliamentary Vice-Minister of Home Affairs	Magoichi Tawara	Kenseikai	January 28, 1926	January 30, 1926
Parliamentary Vice-Minister of Finance	Takeuchi Sakuhei	Kenseikai	January 28, 1926	January 30, 1926
Parliamentary Vice-Minister of the Army	Mizuno Naoshi	Independent	January 28, 1926	January 30, 1926
Parliamentary Vice-Minister of the Navy	Viscount Inoue Tadashirō	Independent	January 28, 1926	January 30, 1926
Parliamentary Vice-Minister of Justice	Honda Tsuneyuki	Kenseikai	January 28, 1926	January 30, 1926
Parliamentary Vice-Minister of Education	Suzuoki Kurajirō	Kenseikai	January 28, 1926	January 30, 1926
Parliamentary Vice-Minister of Agriculture, Forestry and Fisheries	Koyama Shoju	Kenseikai	January 28, 1926	January 30, 1926
Parliamentary Vice-Minister of Commerce and Industry	Sakurai Gunnosuke	Kenseikai	January 28, 1926	January 30, 1926
Parliamentary Vice-Minister of Communications	Tanomogi Keikichi	Kenseikai	January 28, 1926	January 30, 1926
Parliamentary Vice-Minister of Railways	Furuhata Mototaro	Kenseikai	January 28, 1926	January 30, 1926
Parliamentary Counsellors
Portfolio	Name	Political party	Term start	Term end
Parliamentary Counsellor for Foreign Affairs	Nagai Ryūtarō	Kenseikai	January 28, 1926	January 30, 1926
Parliamentary Counsellor of Home Affairs	Suzuki Fujiya	Kenseikai	January 28, 1926	January 30, 1926
Parliamentary Counsellor of Finance	Miki Bukichi	Kenseikai	January 28, 1926	January 30, 1926
Parliamentary Counsellor of the Army	Count Mizoguchi Naoyoshi	Independent	January 28, 1926	January 30, 1926
Parliamentary Counsellor of the Navy	Viscount Itō Jiromaru	Independent	January 28, 1926	January 30, 1926
Parliamentary Counsellor of Justice	Yatsunami Takeji	Kenseikai	January 28, 1926	January 30, 1926
Parliamentary Counsellor of Education	Yamaji Jōichi	Kenseikai	January 28, 1926	January 30, 1926
Parliamentary Counsellor of Agriculture, Forestry and Fisheries	Takada Yohei	Kenseikai	January 28, 1926	January 30, 1926
Parliamentary Counsellor of Commerce and Industry	Nomura Karoku	Kenseikai	January 28, 1926	January 30, 1926
Parliamentary Counsellor of Communications	Kawasaki Katsu	Kenseikai	January 28, 1926	January 30, 1926
Parliamentary Counsellor of Railways	Furuya Yoshitaka	Kenseikai	January 28, 1926	January 30, 1926
