= First Wakatsuki cabinet =

Cabinet of Japan (1926–1927)

First Wakatsuki Cabinet
- 25th Cabinet of Japan
- 1926–1927
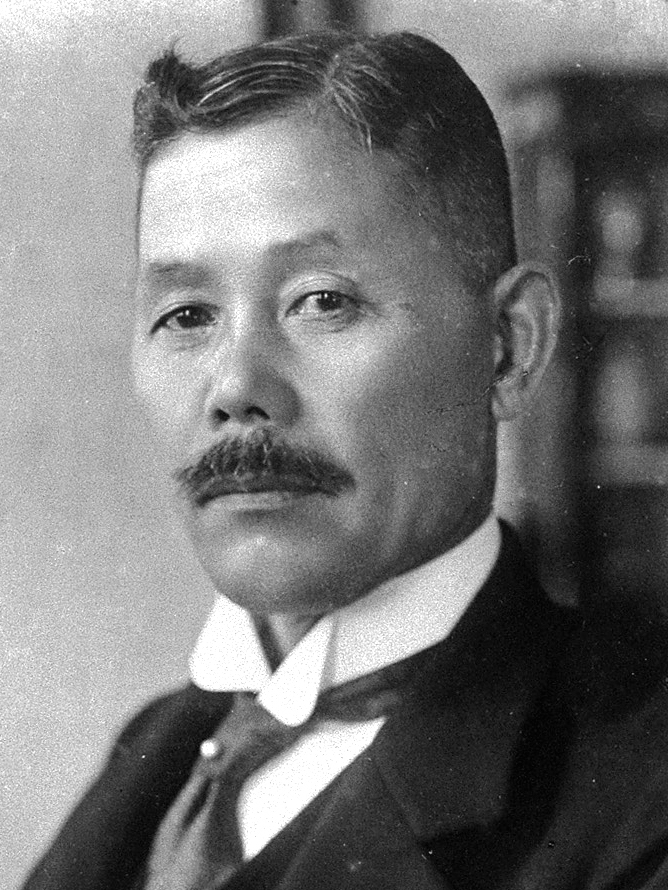
- Prime Minister Wakatsuki Reijirō
- Date formed: January 30, 1926
- Date dissolved: April 20, 1927

People and organisations
- Emperor: Taishō (Jan–Dec 1926); Shōwa (Dec 1926–1927)
- Prime Minister: Wakatsuki Reijirō
- Member party: HoR Blocs: Kenseikai; HoP Blocs: Kenkyūkai; Kōseikai

History
- Legislature terms: 51st Imperial Diet; 52nd Imperial Diet
- Predecessor: Katō Takaaki Cabinet
- Successor: Tanaka Giichi Cabinet

The First Wakatsuki Cabinet is the 25th Cabinet of Japan led by Wakatsuki Reijirō from January 30, 1926 to April 20, 1927.

== Cabinet ==
Ministers
Portfolio	Name	Political party	Term start	Term end
Prime Minister	Wakatsuki Reijirō	Kenseikai	January 30, 1926	April 20, 1927
Minister for Foreign Affairs	Baron Kijūrō Shidehara	Independent	January 30, 1926	April 20, 1927
Minister of Home Affairs	Wakatsuki Reijirō	Kenseikai	January 30, 1926	June 3, 1926
Minister of Home Affairs	Hamaguchi Osachi	Kenseikai	June 3, 1926	April 20, 1927
Minister of Finance	Hamaguchi Osachi	Kenseikai	January 30, 1926	June 3, 1926
Minister of Finance	Hayami Seiji	Kenseikai	June 3, 1926	September 13, 1926
Minister of Finance	Kataoka Naoharu	Kenseikai	September 14, 1926	April 20, 1927
Minister of the Army	Kazushige Ugaki	Military (Army)	January 30, 1926	April 20, 1927
Minister of the Navy	Takarabe Takeshi	Military (Navy)	January 30, 1926	April 20, 1927
Minister of Justice	Egi Tasuku	Kenseikai	January 30, 1926	April 20, 1927
Minister of Education	Okada Ryōhei	Independent	January 30, 1926	April 20, 1927
Minister of Agriculture, Forestry and Fisheries	Hayami Seiji	Kenseikai	January 30, 1926	June 3, 1926
Minister of Agriculture, Forestry and Fisheries	Machida Chūji	Kenseikai	June 3, 1926	April 20, 1927
Minister of Commerce and Industry	Kataoka Naoharu	Kenseikai	January 30, 1926	September 14, 1926
Minister of Commerce and Industry	Fujisawa Ikunosuke	Kenseikai	September 14, 1926	April 20, 1927
Minister of Communications	Adachi Kenzō	Kenseikai	January 30, 1926	April 20, 1927
Minister of Railways	Sengoku Mitsugu	Kenseikai	January 30, 1926	June 3, 1926
Minister of Railways	Viscount Tadashirō Inoue	Independent	June 3, 1926	April 20, 1927
Chief Cabinet Secretary	Tsukamoto Seiji	Independent	January 30, 1926	April 20, 1927
Director-General of the Cabinet Legislation Bureau	Yamakawa Tadao	Independent	January 30, 1926	April 20, 1927
Parliamentary Vice-Ministers
Portfolio	Name	Political party	Term start	Term end
Parliamentary Vice-Minister for Foreign Affairs	Baron Yabuki Shōzō	Independent	January 30, 1926	April 20, 1927
Parliamentary Vice-Minister of Home Affairs	Magoichi Tawara	Kenseikai	January 30, 1926	April 20, 1927
Parliamentary Vice-Minister of Finance	Takeuchi Sakuhei	Kenseikai	January 30, 1926	April 20, 1927
Parliamentary Vice-Minister of the Army	Viscount Mizuno Naoshi	Independent	January 30, 1926	April 20, 1927
Parliamentary Vice-Minister of the Navy	Viscount Inoue Tadashirō	Independent	January 30, 1926	June 3, 1926
Parliamentary Vice-Minister of the Navy	Vacant		June 3, 1926	June 5, 1926
Parliamentary Vice-Minister of the Navy	Furuhata Mototarō	Kenseikai	June 5, 1926	April 20, 1927
Parliamentary Vice-Minister of Justice	Honda Tsuneyuki	Kenseikai	January 30, 1926	April 20, 1927
Parliamentary Vice-Minister of Education	Suzuoki Kurajirō	Kenseikai	January 30, 1926	May 6, 1926
Parliamentary Vice-Minister of Education	Vacant		May 6, 1926	June 5, 1926
Parliamentary Vice-Minister of Education	Tanaka Zenryu	Kenseikai	June 5, 1926	April 20, 1927
Parliamentary Vice-Minister of Agriculture, Forestry and Fisheries	Koyama Shoju	Kenseikai	January 30, 1926	April 20, 1927
Parliamentary Vice-Minister of Commerce and Industry	Sakurai Gonnosuke	Kenseikai	January 30, 1926	April 20, 1927
Parliamentary Vice-Minister of Communications	Tanomogi Keikichi	Kenseikai	January 30, 1926	April 20, 1927
Parliamentary Vice-Minister of Railways	Vacant		January 30, 1926	June 5, 1926
Parliamentary Vice-Minister of Railways	Satake Sango	Kenseikai	June 5, 1926	April 20, 1927
Parliamentary Undersecretaries
Portfolio	Name	Political party	Term start	Term end
Parliamentary Undersecretary for Foreign Affairs	Ryūtarō Nagai	Kenseikai	January 30, 1926	April 20, 1927
Parliamentary Undersecretary of Home Affairs	Suzuki Fujiya	Kenseikai	January 30, 1926	April 20, 1927
Parliamentary Undersecretary of Finance	Bukichi Miki	Kenseikai	January 30, 1926	February 2, 1927
Parliamentary Undersecretary of Finance	Vacant		February 2, 1927	February 5, 1927
Parliamentary Undersecretary of Finance	Seigō Nakano	Kenseikai	February 5, 1927	April 20, 1927
Parliamentary Undersecretary of the Army	Count Mizoguchi Naoyoshi	Independent	January 30, 1926	April 20, 1927
Parliamentary Undersecretary of the Navy	Viscount Itō Jiromaru	Independent	January 30, 1926	April 20, 1927
Parliamentary Undersecretary of Justice	Yatsunami Takeji	Kenseikai	January 30, 1926	April 20, 1927
Parliamentary Undersecretary of Education	Yamaji Jōichi	Kenseikai	January 30, 1926	April 20, 1927
Parliamentary Undersecretary of Agriculture, Forestry and Fisheries	Takada Yohei	Kenseikai	January 30, 1926	April 20, 1927
Parliamentary Undersecretary of Commerce and Industry	Nomura Karoku	Kenseikai	January 30, 1926	April 20, 1927
Parliamentary Undersecretary of Communications	Kawasaki Katsu	Kenseikai	January 30, 1926	April 20, 1927
Parliamentary Undersecretary of Railways	Furuya Yoshitaka	Kenseikai	January 30, 1926	April 20, 1927
