= Tanomogi Keikichi =

Japanese politician

- 頼母木 桂吉
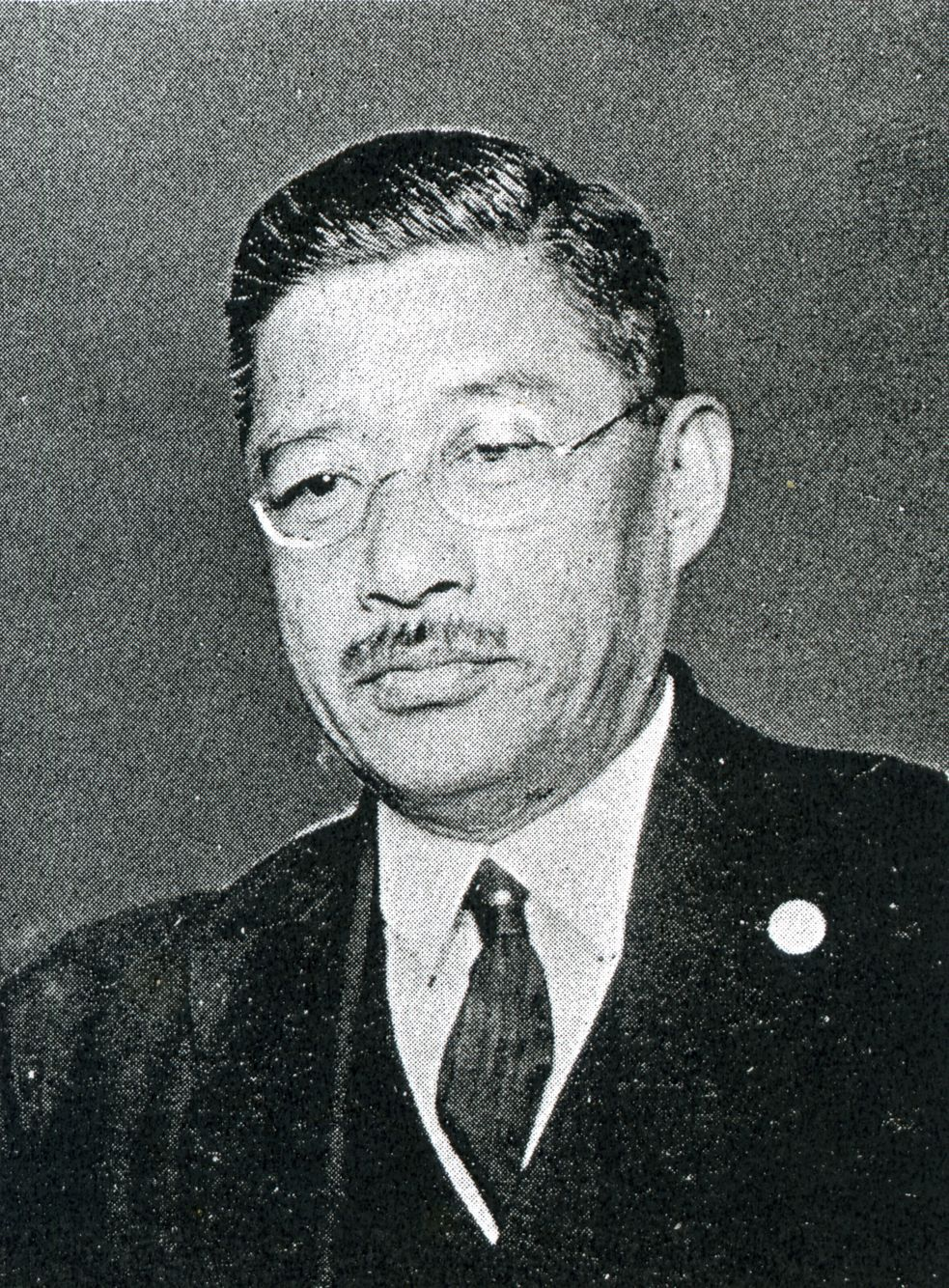
- Tanomogi in 1929

Mayor of Tokyo
- In office 24 April 1939 – 19 February 1940
- Preceded by: Ichita Kobashi
- Succeeded by: Okubo Tomejiro

Minister of Communications
- In office 9 March 1936 – 2 February 1937
- Prime Minister: Kōki Hirota
- Preceded by: Mochizuki Keisuke
- Succeeded by: Tatsunosuke Yamazaki

Member of the House of Representatives
- In office 25 March 1915 – 19 February 1940
- Preceded by: Multi-member district
- Succeeded by: Shinroku Tanomogi
- Constituency: Tokyo City (1915–1920); Tokyo 7th (1920–1928); Tokyo 3rd (1928–1940)

Personal details
- Born: Inoue Keikichi; 5 November 1867 Fukuyama, Hiroshima, Japan
- Died: 19 February 1940 (aged 72)
- Resting place: Yanaka Cemetery
- Party: Rikken Minseitō (1927–1940)
- Other political affiliations: Rikken Dōshikai (1915–1916); Kenseikai (1916–1927)
- Children: Shinroku Tanomogi (adopted)
- Education: First Higher School

Tanomogi Keikichi (頼母木桂吉; 5 November 1867 – 19 February 1940) was a Japanese journalist, politician and cabinet minister in Taishō and early Shōwa period Japan. His wife, Tanomogi Koma, was a noted violinist and professor of music at the Tokyo Academy of Music.

== Early life ==
Tanomogi was born in what is now part of Fukuyama, Hiroshima, and his surname at birth was Inoue. In 1903, he was adopted into the Tanomogi family by marriage. After graduating from the First Higher School in Tokyo, he travelled to the United States for studies, and after his return to Japan found employment with the Hōchi Shimbun newspaper in 1896. In 1899 he founded his own newspaper, the Chōnō Shimbun, but returned to the Hōchi Shimbun in 1901 and was instrumental in the expansion of that firm in a major national newspaper with increased business coverage, hiring Japan's first woman journalist, and the issuing of an evening edition in 1906. Also in 1906 he travelled to the United States and Europe on an inspection tour of the overseas newspaper business and on his return to Japan almost three years later in 1908, he founded a press club the Japan Press Agency. He also established a company to import raw film for photo journalism, and footage of the assassination of Itō Hirobumi in 1910 created a sensation.

== Political career ==
Tanomogi was elected as an assemblyman from Asakusa Ward in Tokyo in 1911.

In the 1915 General Election, Tanomogi was elected to the House of Representatives under the Rikken Dōshikai political party. He was elected a total of nine times, changing his party affiliation to the Kenseikai (where he was chairman of the Policy Affairs Research Council), and the Rikken Minseitō (where he was secretary-general and director of general affairs). He became undersecretary of communications under the Katō Takaaki Cabinet and the First Wakatsuki Cabinet, and was subsequently Minister of Communications in the Hirota Cabinet from March 1936 to February 1937.

During his tenure as communications minister, Tanomogi promulgated an aggressive five-year shipbuilding plan to expand Japan's merchant fleet by six million tons with government subsidies. He also promoted the complete nationalization of Japan's electric power industry, with the state assuming complete managerial control without actually seizing ownership. The plan was based on fascist economic theories and had the benefit to the government of enabling state control without the expense of compensating owners. Although the plan had the support of the Imperial Japanese Army, who say it as a stepping stone to further state control of the economy, strong opposition by the business community delayed its implementation until after Tanomogi left office in 1938. Tanomogi was also instrumental in creating laws under which only the Dōmei Tsushin was allowed to receive and send overseas telegraph messages, thus giving Dōmei a monopoly from which every Japanese newspaper was forced to obtain its news.

In 1938, Tanomogi returned to the Hōchi Shimbun as its president. In 1939, he was elected Mayor of Tokyo. He died while in office and his grave is at Yanaka Cemetery in Tokyo.

Political offices
Preceded by Mochizuki Keisuke	Minister of Communications; 9 Mar 1936 – 2 Feb 1937	Succeeded by Tatsunosuke Yamazaki
Preceded by Ichita Kobashi	Mayor of Tokyo; 24 Apr 1939 – 19 Feb 1940	Succeeded by Tomejirō Ōkubo
