= Ebara Soroku =

Japanese politician

- 江原 素六
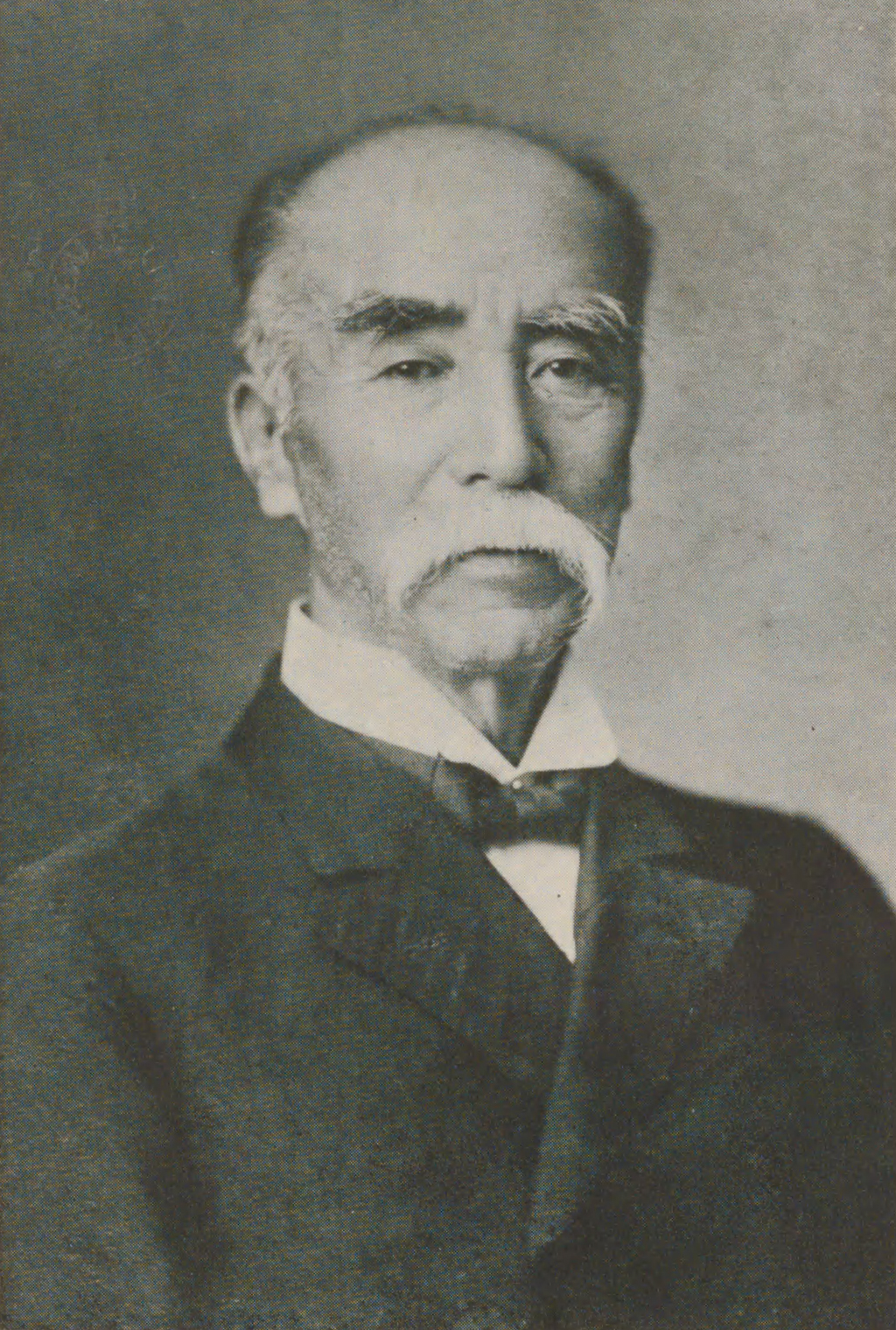

Member of the House of Peers
- In office 2 April 1912 – 19 May 1922 Nominated by the Emperor

Member of the House of Representatives
- In office 1 March 1903 – 27 March 1908
- Preceded by: Nakahachi Yoshiaki
- Succeeded by: Kazuo Hatoyama
- Constituency: Tokyo City
- In office 2 July 1890 – 10 June 1898
- Preceded by: Constituency established
- Succeeded by: Ōmura Wakichirō
- Constituency: Shizuoka 7th

Personal details
- Born: 10 March 1842 Edo, Musashi, Japan
- Died: 19 May 1922 (aged 80) Numazu, Shizuoka, Japan
- Party: Rikken Seiyūkai
- Other political affiliations: Liberal (1890–1898)

Ebara Soroku (江原 素六; 10 March 1842 – 19 May 1922) was a samurai of the late Edo period who went on to become an educator and politician in the Meiji era.

== Biography ==
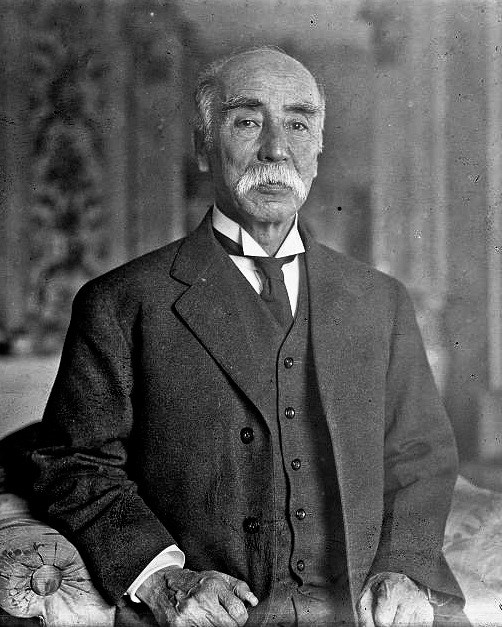
Ebara Soroku

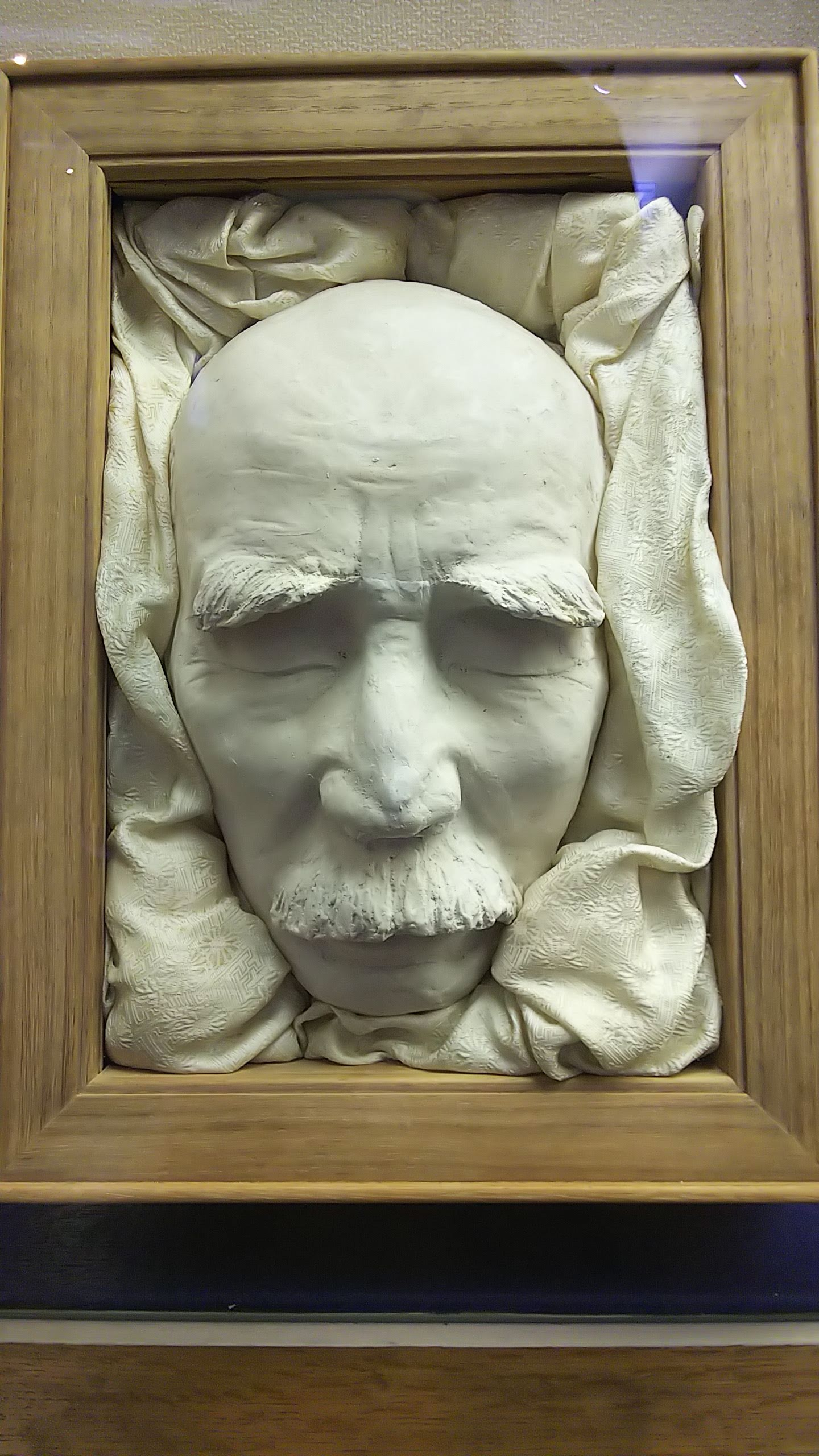
A death mask of Ebara Soroku

Ebara was born in Edo as the son of a lesser retainer of the Tokugawa shogunate, but was an exceptionally talented scholar and selected for the Shogunal military academy based on his performance at the terakoya temple schools.

Following his combat service at the Battle of Toba–Fushimi during the Boshin War of the Meiji Restoration, he visited the United States. On his return to Japan, he moved to Shizuoka Prefecture to be near the former shōgun Tokugawa Yoshinobu and assisted in establishing the Numazu Military Academy and Numazu Junior High School. Converting to Christianity in 1877, he was responsible for starting the Numazu Church. Later, Ebara served as chairman of the Tokyo YMCA. After the reavtivation of districts as modern administrative unit, he was district chief (gunchō) of Suntō.

In 1890, Ebara was elected in the 1890 Japanese general election to the House of Representatives in the Diet of Japan and served as a member of the Liberal Party, the Kenseikai, and the Rikken Seiyūkai. In 1912, he was appointed to the House of Peers. He was sent to the United States to try to ease tension over California's Alien Land Law of 1913.

Ebara is also remembered as the founder of Azabu High School (then a middle school).

Ebara died of a cerebral hemorrhage.
