= Azabu High School =

Location
- Moto-Azabu, Minato, Tokyo, Japan; 35°39′15″N 139°43′40″E

Information
- Type: Private School
- Established: 1895
- Founder: Soroku Ebara
- Principal: Hideaki Taira
- Faculty: 100
- Grades: 7 - 12
- Gender: Male
- Enrollment: 1800
- Major(s): Liberal Arts
- Website: https://www.azabu-jh.ed.jp/about/en.html

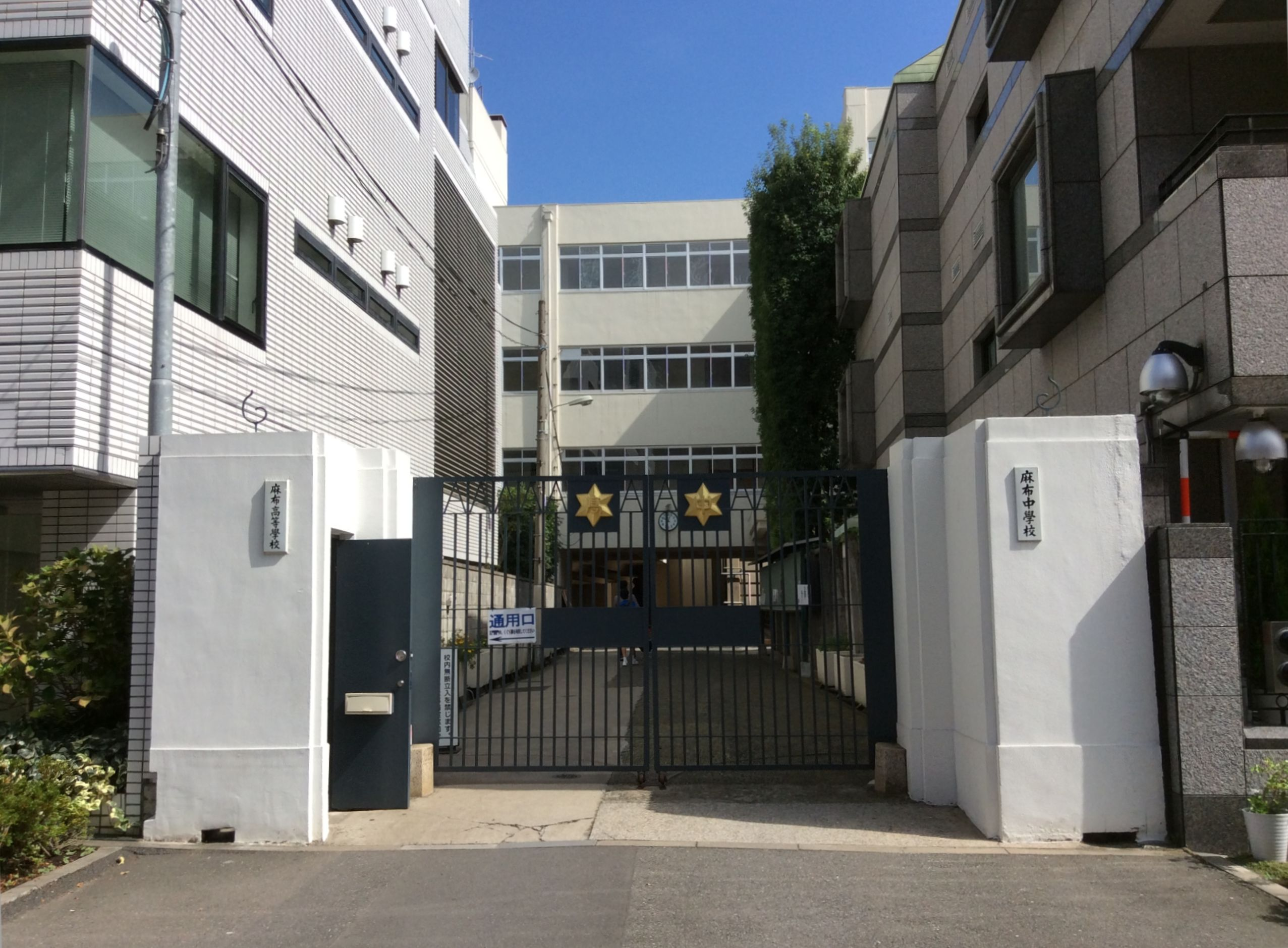
Gate

Azabu Junior and Senior High School (麻布中学校・高等学校, Azabu Chūgakkō Kōtōgakkō), often referred to simply as "Azabu", is a private preparatory day school in Japan. It teaches boys between seventh and twelves grades. The campus of Azabu is located in the Azabu district of Minato, Tokyo, Japan.

Azabu consists of two institutions - Azabu Junior and Senior High Schools (麻布中学校・高等学校, Azabu Chūgakkō Kōtōgakkō), the former teaches pupils between seventh and ninth grades while the latter teaches pupils between tenth and twelfth grades. Traditions at Azabu are liberal and magnanimous; there are no established school rules that students are required to adhere, and there is no "study-compelling" atmosphere.

== History ==
Azabu was founded by Soroku Ebara, a Japanese educator in the transitional period of Japan, in 1895. He had been President of the Toyo Eiwa School since 1893. Toyo Eiwa was affiliated with the Methodist Church of Canada and due to the rise of nationalism in Japan, the school was suffering from a low enrolment. Azabu was founded by Soroku who decided that the new school should not have religious affiliations.

Azabu was founded as a middle school at the Toyo Eiwa School but received its new name, Azabu Ordinary Middle School, during the first academic year. The school initially offered classes at the Toyo Eiwa Theological Seminary but it relocated to the current location in 1890 when Toyo Eiwa Theological Seminary was driven into a permanent closure due to a low enrollment. At the time of the relocation, the school received a new name, Azabu Middle School. After the World War II, the school was restructured to create Azabu Junior and Senior High Schools to meet a new regulation. Although they are separate entities, Azabu has been managed as a single school that teaches pupils between seventh and twelves grades.

== Present ==
Azabu teaches boys between seventh and twelves grades and admits 300 students each year through a competitive admission process including written exams in Japanese, Mathematics, Science, and Social Science. These written exams are typically conducted on the first day of February annually on Azabu's campus. There are over 100 teachers and about 1,800 students in total at a given time. The school festival, which usually takes place from third to the fifth of May, is one of the largest in Japanese high schools, with over 20,000 people attending each year. The athletic meet is held in October. There are nearly 50 clubs, and the chess club, the Othello club, the go club, and the shogi club are especially well known for their achievements. The clubs (often referred to as "circles" in the school), the school festival, and the athletic meet are all planned and organized solely by students. Azabu is also active in international exchange programs: there currently are exchange programs with Shawnigan Lake School in Canada, Winchester College in UK, and Ningbo Polytechnic in People's Republic of China.

== Location/facility ==
The school is located in the Azabu district (the namesake of the school name) in the Minato Ward, and the nearest train station is Hiroo Station (Tokyo Metro Hibiya Line). The Azabu district is mostly residential, and the main gate of the school is so narrow that one may not notice that there is a large school there. Admission to Azabu being so competitive, "Azabu's narrow gate" signifies how difficult it is to secure a seat at Azabu.

The classrooms are located in the main building, which is a square-shaped, 4-story building with a courtyard. The courtyard can also be used as two tennis courts. In 1995, a building commemorating the 100th anniversary was constructed. The 100th anniversary building houses the library and some club rooms. The number of books in the library is over 40,000, which is a large number for a high school library.

The schoolyard has a 200-meter track (which is also a soccer field), four volleyball courts, two more tennis courts and a 25-meter pool.

== See also ==
- List of high schools in Tokyo
