= Okazaki Kunisuke =

Japanese politician

Junior Third Rank Okazaki Kunisuke
- 岡崎 邦輔
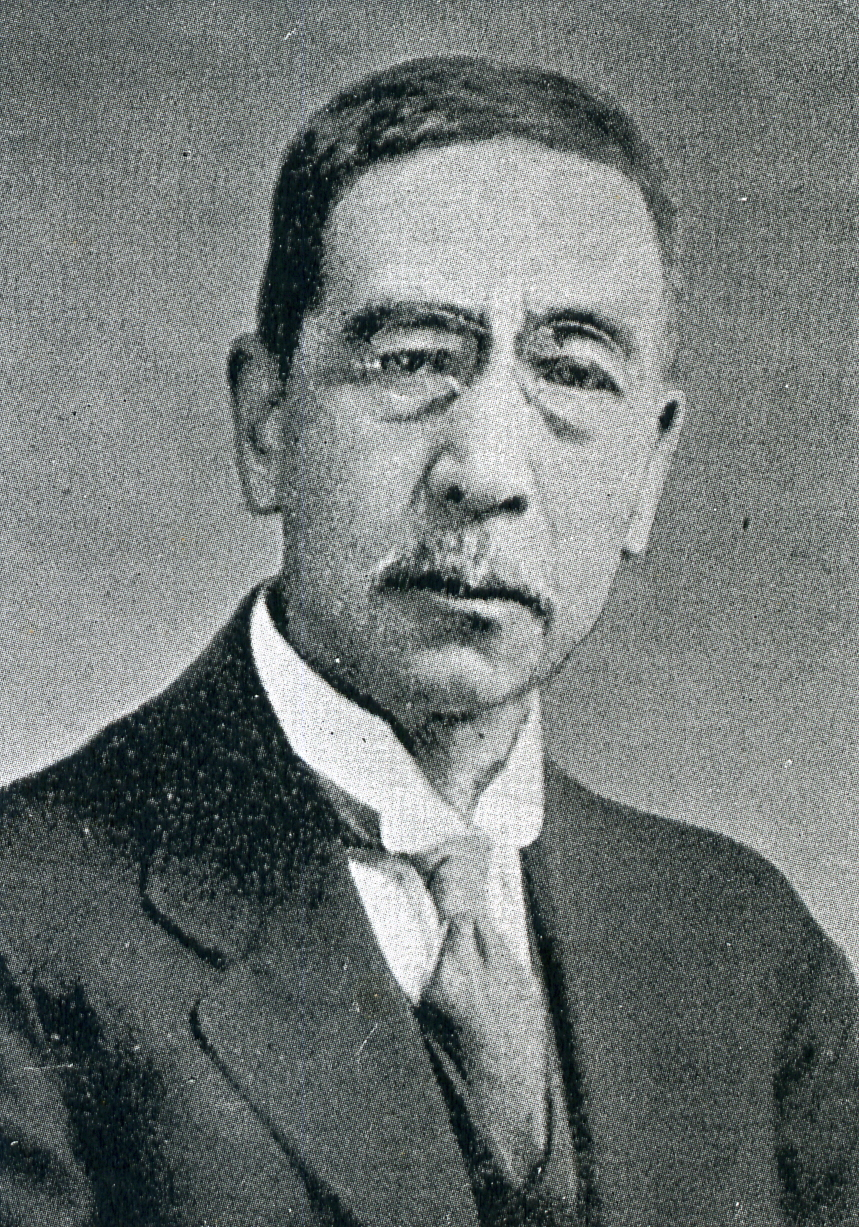
- Okazaki in 1932

Minister of Agriculture and Forestry
- In office 17 April 1925 – 2 August 1925
- Prime Minister: Katō Takaaki
- Preceded by: Takahashi Korekiyo
- Succeeded by: Hayami Seiji

Member of the House of Peers
- In office 4 April 1928 – 22 July 1936 Nominated by the Emperor

Member of the House of Representatives
- In office 15 May 1908 – 21 January 1928
- Preceded by: Sekine Ryūsuke
- Succeeded by: Constituency abolished
- Constituency: Tokyo Counties (1908–1912); Wakayama Counties (1912–1920); Wakayama 2nd (1920–1928)
- In office 1 September 1894 – 10 June 1898
- Preceded by: Senda Gunnosuke
- Succeeded by: Hamaguchi Kichiemon
- Constituency: Wakayama 1st
- In office 24 September 1891 – 30 December 1893
- Preceded by: Mutsu Munemitsu
- Succeeded by: Senda Gunnosuke
- Constituency: Wakayama 1st

Personal details
- Born: 12 April 1854 Wakayama, Kii, Japan
- Died: 22 July 1936 (aged 82) Shibuya, Tokyo, Japan
- Party: Rikken Seiyūkai
- Other political affiliations: Independent (1891–1897); Jiyūtō (1897–1898); Kenseitō (1898–1900)
- Education: University of Michigan

Okazaki Kunisuke (岡崎邦輔; 12 April 1854 – 22 July 1936) was a politician and cabinet minister in the late Meiji and Taishō period Empire of Japan.

== Biography ==
Okazaki was born as the younger son in a samurai class family in Wakayama Domain, what is now Wakayama Prefecture. His father was a karō with revenues of 400 koku as a direct retainer of the Kiishū Tokugawa family, and he was the first cousin of Mutsu Munemitsu.

After the Meiji Restoration, at the invitation of Mutsu Munemitsu, Okazaki left Wakayama for Tokyo in 1873. When Mutsu was appointed as ambassador to the United States, Okazaki accompanied him as his secretary and enrolled in the University of Michigan, where he became acquainted with Minakata Kumagusu. Okazaki returned to Japan in 1890, and was elected to the lower house of the Diet of Japan in the 1890 Japanese general election. It marked the start of his political career, and he was subsequently to be reelected to the House of Representatives multiple times. In 1897, he became a member of the Liberal Party of Japan (Jiyūtō). After Mutsu's death, he became associated with another of Mutsu's protégés, Hoshi Toru, and supported the overthrow of the First Ōkuma Cabinet, and the formation of the Association of Friends of Constitutional Government party.

In 1900, Okazaki was chosen to become Minister of Communications in the Fourth Itō Cabinet. For the next twenty years, he continued to play an active, behind-the-scenes role in Japanese party politics, reemerging into the spotlight as Minister of Agriculture and Forestry under the Katō Takaaki Cabinet in 1925. In 1928, he was appointed to the House of Peers.
