= Magoichi Tawara =

Japanese politician (1869–1944)

- 俵 孫一
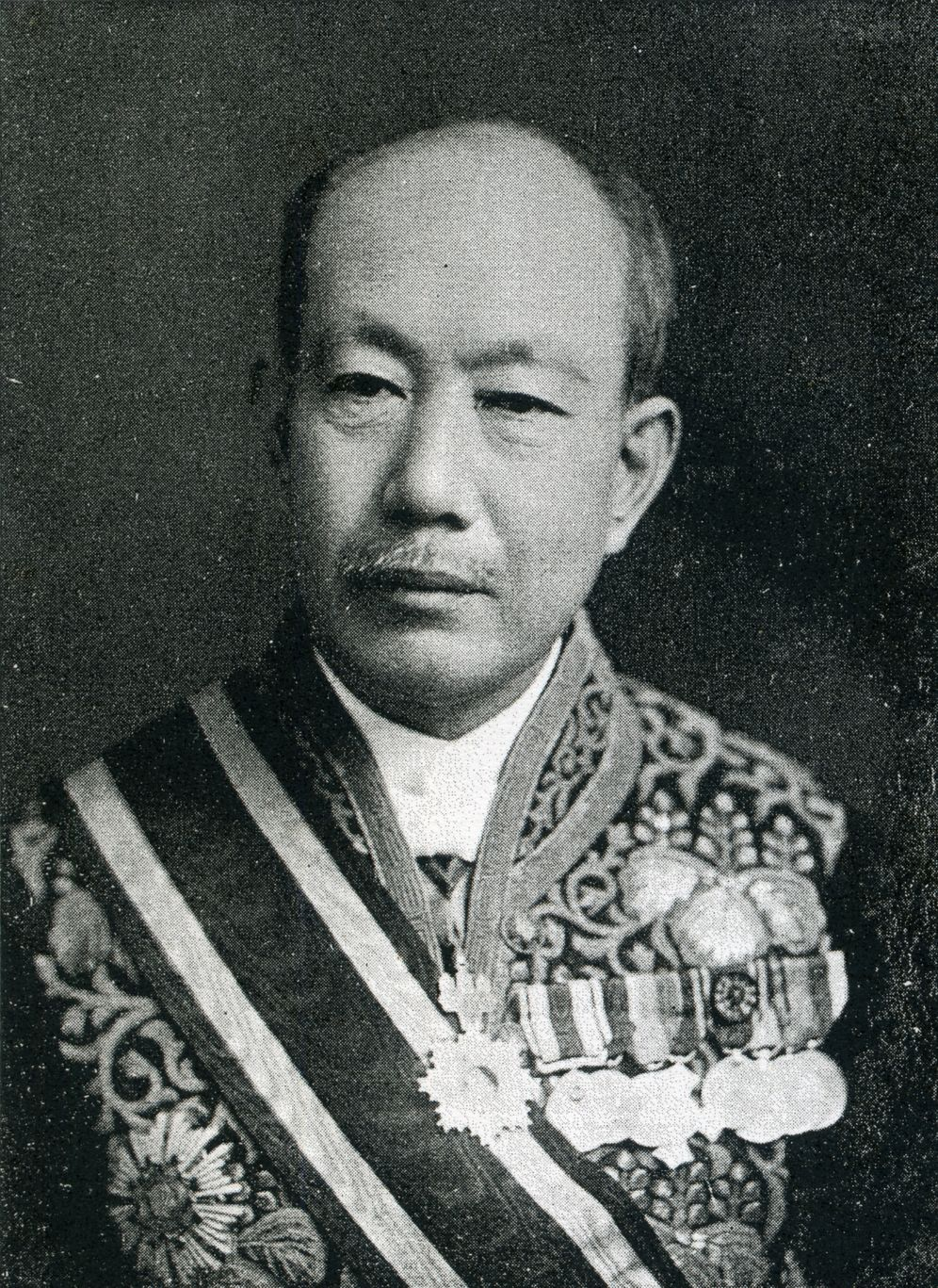
- Tawara in 1929

Minister of Commerce and Industry
- In office 2 July 1929 – 14 April 1931
- Prime Minister: Hamaguchi Osachi
- Preceded by: Nakahashi Tokugorō
- Succeeded by: Yukio Sakurauchi

Member of the House of Representatives
- In office 10 May 1924 – 29 April 1942
- Preceded by: Toshio Shimada
- Succeeded by: Katsunosuke Tanaka
- Constituency: Shimane 5th (1924–1928); Shimane 2nd (1928–1942)

14th Director-General of the Hokkaidō Agency
- In office 12 August 1915 – 18 April 1919
- Monarch: Taishō
- Preceded by: Hiromichi Nishikubo
- Succeeded by: Shin'ichi Kasai

Governor of Miyagi Prefecture
- In office 28 April 1914 – 12 August 1915
- Monarch: Taishō
- Preceded by: Mori Masataka
- Succeeded by: Tsunenosuke Hamada

Governor of Mie Prefecture
- In office 22 December 1912 – 28 April 1914
- Monarch: Taishō
- Preceded by: Kiyochika Kubota
- Succeeded by: Eitaro Mabuchi

Personal details
- Born: 16 June 1869 Hamada, Shimane, Japan
- Died: 17 June 1944 (aged 75) Akasaka, Tokyo, Japan
- Resting place: Aoyama Cemetery
- Party: Rikken Minseitō (1927–1940)
- Other political affiliations: Kenseikai (1924–1927); IRAA (1940–1942)
- Education: Tokyo Imperial University

Magoichi Tawara (俵 孫一, Tawara Magoichi; 16 June 1869 – 17 June 1944) was a bureaucrat, politician and cabinet minister in the pre-war Empire of Japan.

== Early life ==
Tawara was born in what is now part of the city of Hamada in Shimane Prefecture Japan. The Tawara family had been making soy sauce and candles in Hamada for generations. He graduated from the law department of Tokyo Imperial University in 1895, and became an official in the Home Ministry. He worked as an official in four different prefectural governments over the next eleven years. His first was Okinawa, where he was instrumental in writing laws on land reform and establishing a tax system, bringing the former Kingdom of the Ryukyus closer to legal assimilation with mainland Japan. In January 1906 he was transferred to a position in the newly created Regency General of Korea. Resident-General of Korea. In April he was assigned to oversee the Korean Education Ministry. In August 1907 he was named Vice-Minister of Education. He subsequently assisted in the first land survey of Korea under Japanese rule in 1910.

== Political career ==
After returning to Japan, he was appointed as Governor of Mie Prefecture (1912–1914), Governor of Miyazaki Prefecture (1914–1915), Director-General of the Hokkaido Agency (1915–1919), and served as a senior official within the Ministry of Colonial Affairs. Tawara was elected to the Lower House of the Diet of Japan in the 1924 General Election, under the Kenseikai banner. He later changed his political party affiliation to the Rikken Minseitō, and was reelected for six terms. He served as Secretary-General of the party in 1929.

In 1929, Prime Minister Osachi Hamaguchi picked Tawara as Minister of Commerce and Industry. After his term expired in April 1931, he continued to play an important role in the Diet and in the general administration of the Rikken Minseitō. As with all other Japanese politicians, Tawara was forced to join the Taisei Yokusankai created by Prime Minister Fumimaro Konoe in 1940. However, Tawara was defeated in the 1942 General Election and retired from public life. He died in 1944 at the age of 77.

Political offices
Preceded by Tokugorō Nakahashi	Minister of Commerce and Industry; Jul 1929 – Apr 1931	Succeeded by Yukio Sakurauchi
