= Adachi Kenzō =

Japanese politician (1864–1948)

- 安達 謙蔵
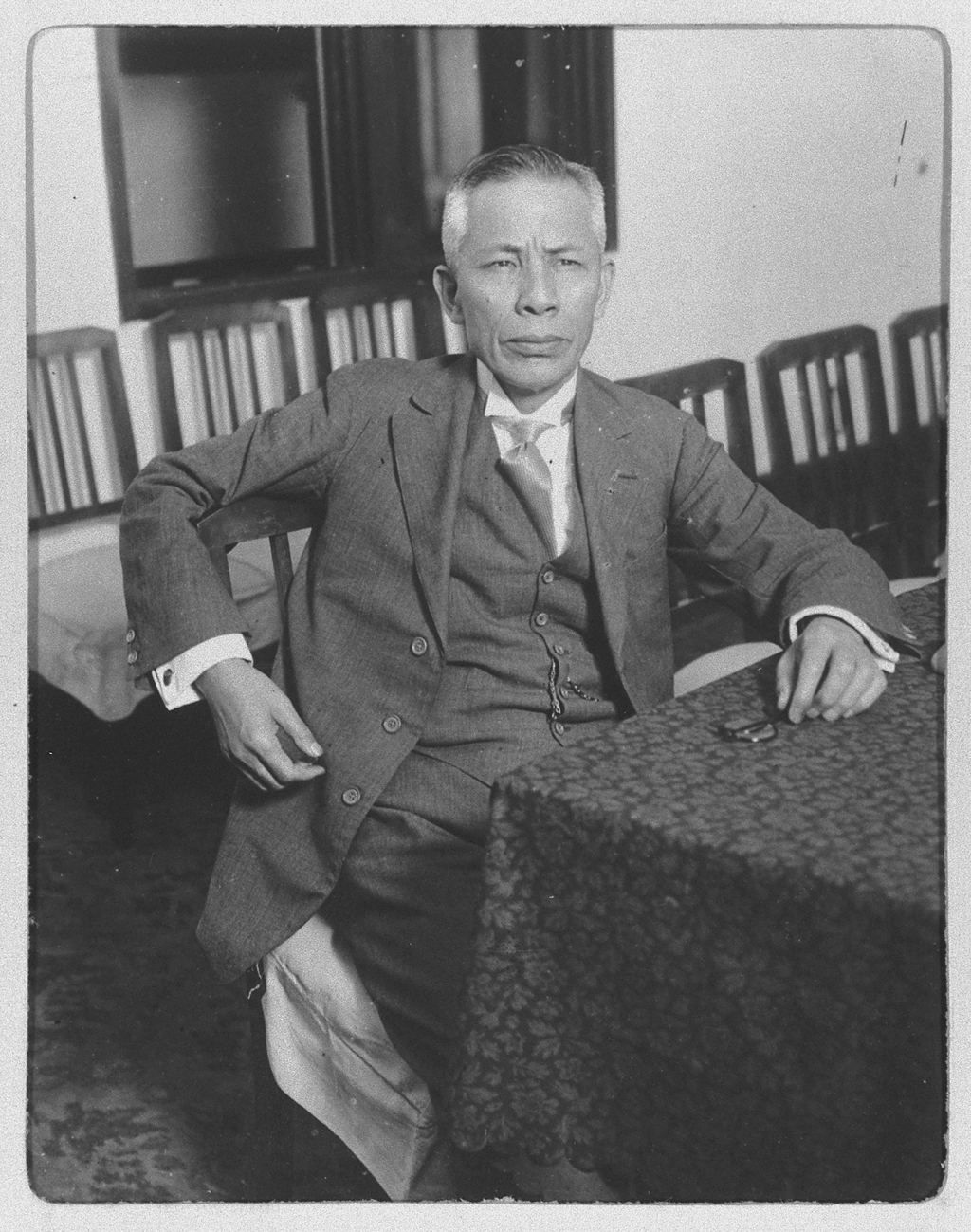
- Adachi in 1929

President of the Kokumin Dōmei
- In office 22 December 1932 – 26 July 1940
- Preceded by: Position established
- Succeeded by: Position abolished

Minister of Home Affairs
- In office 2 July 1929 – 14 April 1931
- Prime Minister: Hamaguchi Osachi; Wakatsuki Reijirō
- Preceded by: Mochizuki Keisuke
- Succeeded by: Nakahashi Tokugorō

Minister of Communications
- In office 30 May 1925 – 20 April 1927
- Prime Minister: Katō Takaaki; Wakatsuki Reijirō
- Preceded by: Inukai Tsuyoshi
- Succeeded by: Mochizuki Keisuke

Member of the House of Representatives
- In office 21 April 1917 – 30 April 1942
- Preceded by: Multi-member district
- Succeeded by: Masato Arakawa
- Constituency: Kumamoto Counties (1917–1920); Kumamoto 4th (1920–1928); Kumamoto 2nd (1928–1932); Kumamoto 1st (1932–1942)
- In office 11 August 1902 – 25 December 1914
- Preceded by: Constituency established
- Succeeded by: Multi-member district
- Constituency: Kumamoto Counties

Personal details
- Born: 20 December 1864 Kumamoto, Japan
- Died: 2 August 1948 (aged 83) Kumamoto, Japan
- Party: Kokumin Dōmei (1932–1940)
- Other political affiliations: Teikokutō (1899–1905); Daidō Club (1905–1910); Chūō Club (1910–1913); Rikken Dōshikai (1913–1916); Kenseikai (1916–1927); Rikken Minseitō (1927–1932); Independent (1940–1942)

Adachi Kenzō (安達 謙蔵; 20 December 1864 – 2 August 1948) was a Japanese politician active during the Taishō and early Shōwa periods.

He participated in the 1895 assassination of the Korean queen.

== Early life ==
Adachi was the son of a samurai in the service of the Hosokawa clan of Kumamoto Domain. After the Meiji Restoration, he studied at the academy founded by Sasaki Tokifusa in Kumamoto. In 1894, during the First Sino-Japanese War he travelled to Korea, initially as a free-lance war correspondent, but soon established two Japanese-language newspapers, the Chōsen Jihō and the Keijō Shimpō. He was later charged with being one of the central instigators and organizers of the assassination of Korean Empress Myeongseong, along with Miura Gorō. Together with other members of the plot, he was arrested on his return to Japan, but was acquitted by the Japanese courts. His acquittal has been criticized by modern historians, as he had been charged with both murder and conspiracy to commit murder, and the court's verdict included an admission of evidence of conspiracy, and yet he was acquitted of both.

== Political career ==
In the 1902 Japanese general election, Adachi was elected to the House of Representatives from the Kumamoto Counties constituency as a member of the Rikken Dōshikai, and was re-elected four consecutive times, serving until 25 December 1914, when he became Deputy Foreign Minister under the Second Ōkuma Cabinet. He was elected again to the House of Representatives in the 1917 general election, serving for another eight consecutive terms to 30 April 1942. The Rikken Dōshikai became the Kenseikai in 1916, which merged with the Seiyu Hontō in 1926 to form the Rikken Minseitō. Adachi was active in organizing these mergers and changes, and consistently promoted a hard-line policy towards China.

Adachi was selected to be Communications Minister under the Katō Takaaki Cabinet in May 1925, continuing under the First Wakatsuki Cabinet until April 1927. He then served as Home Minister under the Hamaguchi Cabinet from July 1929, continuing in the same post under the Second Wakatsuki Cabinet in December 1931. While as Home Minister, he supported bills granting voting rights to women in local elections, as a first step towards women’s suffrage on a national basis.

Adachi split with the Rikken Minseitō in 1931 over disagreements with Prime Minister Wakatsuki's opposition to the aggressive steps taken by the Imperial Japanese Army in Manchuria and with Wakatsuki's economic policies. He brought down the Wakatsuki administration by boycotting cabinet meetings after his proposals for a coalition with the rival Rikken Seiyūkai were rejected. He formed a new political party, the Kokumin Dōmei in December 1932, together with Nakano Seigō. The new party advocated for a dirigiste economy with government control of strategic industries and financial institutions, and the creation of a Japan-Manchukuo economic union. The party was absorbed into the Taisei Yokusankai in 1940. However, in 1942, Adachi did not run for re-election, and retired from public life. After the surrender of Japan, he was purged by the American occupation authorities. He died in August 1948 at age 83.

Political offices
Preceded by Inukai Tsuyoshi	Minister of Communications; 30 May 1925 – 20 April 1927	Succeeded by Mochizuki Keisuke
Preceded by Mochizuki Keisuke	Minister of Home Affairs; 2 July 1929 – 14 April 1931	Succeeded by Nakahashi Tokugorō
