= Yasumasa Narasaki =

Japanese politician (1928–2014)

- 楢崎 泰昌

Member of the House of Councillors
- In office 26 July 1992 – 25 July 1998
- Constituency: National PR

Personal details
- Born: 9 September 1928 Tokyo, Japan
- Died: 21 October 2014 (aged 86) Tokyo, Japan
- Party: Liberal Democratic
- Relatives: Hamaguchi Osachi (grandfather-in-law)
- Education: University of Tokyo

Yasumasa Narasaki (楢崎 泰昌, Narasaki Yasumasa; 9 September 1928 – 21 October 2014) was a Japanese politician from the Liberal Democratic Party. He served as a member of the House of Councillors from 1992 to 1998.
