= Bukichi Miki =

Japanese politician (1884-1956)

- 三木 武吉
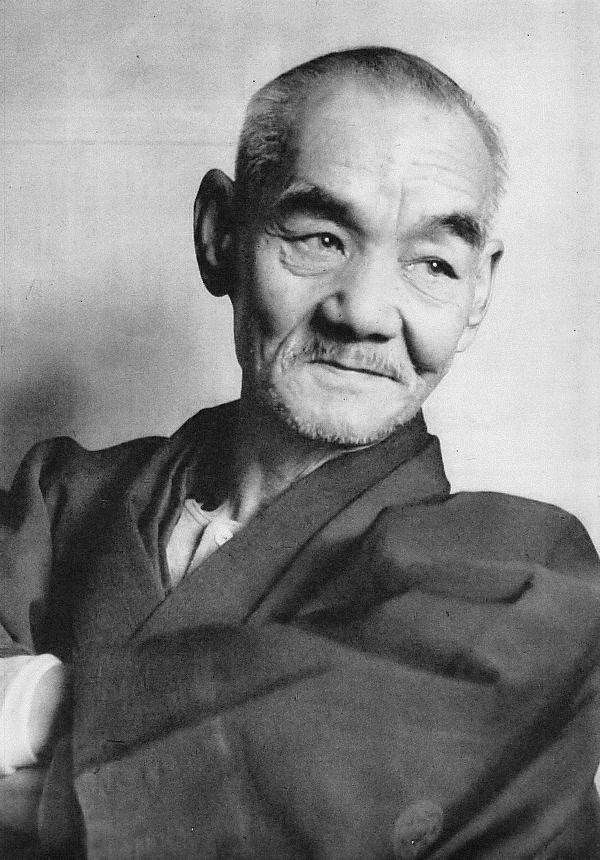
- Miki in 1953

Member of the House of Representatives
- In office 2 October 1952 – 4 July 1956
- Preceded by: Minoru Tamaki
- Succeeded by: Toshiichi Fuke
- Constituency: Kagawa 1st
- In office 1 May 1942 – 22 June 1946
- Preceded by: Chōkichi Miyawaki
- Succeeded by: Fukuda Shigeyoshi
- Constituency: Kagawa 1st (1942–1946); Kagawa at-large (1946)
- In office 22 April 1917 – 26 March 1934
- Preceded by: Multi-member district
- Succeeded by: Tamashige Hara
- Constituency: Tokyo City (1917–1920); Tokyo 11th (1920–1928); Tokyo 1st (1928–1934)

Personal details
- Born: 15 August 1884 Takamatsu, Kagawa, Japan
- Died: 4 July 1956 (aged 71) Meguro, Tokyo, Japan
- Party: Liberal Democratic (1955–1956)
- Other political affiliations: Kenseikai (1916–1927); CDP (1927–1940); IRAA (1940–1945); JLP (1945–1948); DLP (1948–1950); LP (1950–1953); LP–H (1953–1954); JDP (1954–1955)
- Education: Waseda University

Bukichi Miki (三木 武吉, Miki Bukichi; 15 August 1884 – 4 July 1956) was a Japanese politician. He was a close friend and ally of Ichiro Hatoyama, and was the key figure in carrying out the "conservative merger" that resulted in the formation of the Liberal Democratic Party.

Despite being a powerful conservative politician in the Taishō and Shōwa eras, Miki remarkably never held any cabinet post. He still has a high reputation as the archetype of a behind-the-scenes power broker, and at the zenith of their power there were times when both Kanemaru Shin and Hiromu Nonaka were openly complimented by Prime Minister Yasuhiro Nakasone for having "surpassed Bukichi Miki."

Miki's nicknames included "the heckling general," "the wily schemer," and "the great tanuki of Japanese politics."

== Early life ==
Miki was born in Takamatsu, then in Ehime Prefecture but now in Kagawa Prefecture, as the first son of Komon Miki, an antiques dealer. His family was not related to that of Takeo Miki.

In his second year at Takamatsu Secondary, now Kagawa Prefectural Takamatsu High School, he walked out on his bill at an udon restaurant and encouraged others to do the same, and thus was expelled from school. He transferred to Doshisha Secondary in Kyoto, now Doshisha Junior and Senior High School, but was expelled again for getting into a fight. He went to Tokyo with the help of the politician Tooru Hoshi but on 21 June 1901, the day on which Miki would go to work as a live-in student at his law office, Hoshi was assassinated.

Miki was admitted into Tokyo Vocational School, called Waseda University from 1902 and on, where he counted among his classmates future politicians Ryutaro Nagai and Ikuo Oyama and baseball player Shin Hashido. While spending much of his time chasing women in Shinjuku, he earnestly studied law and practiced baseball. Although he even joined the Waseda Baseball Club at its inception, it was said that he exhibited little talent. However, his name does not appear in Bushi, the official records of the club, and he was also not a member of the Tomon Club, composed of the Waseda Baseball Club's alumni. This was also the time of his budding romance with Kaneko Amano, a woman known as "the beauty of Waseda" who was popular among the students and would go on to become Miki's wife. He graduated in 1904.

Miki worked for a brief time as a scribe at Waseda University Library. The next year, in 1905, he went to work with the Bank of Japan at their Moji branch. However, he participated in an open-house anti-government meeting in opposition to the Treaty of Portsmouth and after giving a speech demanding the resignation of Prime Minister Taro Katsura he was charged with violating the code of conduct for civil servants and was discharged. In 1907, he passed the Higher Civil Service Examination for the judiciary and was appointed as an assistant judicial officer in the Tokyo District Court, but life as a civil servant did not suit his personality, and after seven months he instead became a lawyer. The same year, he married Kaneko Amano.

== Political career ==
=== Pre-war ===
In 1913, Miki was elected to the Ushigome ward assembly. Soon after, he ran for a seat in the House of Representatives but was defeated. In 1916, he joined the Kenseikai and in 1917, he won a seat in that year's general elections to the House.

Miki distinguished himself in his new role as a member of the House. Above all, he more than earned his nickname, "the heckling general", through his trenchant criticisms of the government. He also caught the eye of Osachi Hamaguchi following his spirited debate with Home Minister Takejiro Tokonami in defense of universal suffrage. After that Hamaguchi became his political mentor.

In 1920, Miki toured Siberia for one month as a member of a committee of inquiry for the Imperial Diet concerning the Siberian expedition. The tour led Miki to the conclusion that the expedition was interference in the internal affairs of another nation, inspired by the militaristic ambitions of the army which were steeped in the traditions of the Meiji oligarchy. Therefore, he wrote up an open letter and a speech for question period that held the militarists, oligarchs, and bureaucrats accountable for the war and sought to link the neutralization of these forces to the establishment of true parliamentary democracy. With a view to also using it to force the resignation of incumbent Prime Minister Takashi Hara, Miki handed in the completed manuscript to Takaaki Kato, president of the Kenseikai, through Hamaguchi. However, Miki was disheartened when the manuscript was rejected by Kato and Hamaguchi who advised him to focus on internal matters for fear his revelations about the origins of the war would damage Japan's international reputation. Even so, they were both deeply impressed by the depth and detail of his work.

In June 1922, Miki was also elected to the Tokyo City Council. He formed the Shisei Kakushin Domei which emphasized cleaning up city politics and clashed with the Rikken Seiyukai-aligned Shinkokai. At that time, one of his political foes in Tokyo City politics was Shinkokai member Ichiro Hatoyama, who would later become a close friend.

In January 1924, at the young age of 39 and after having served only two terms in the House, Miki was promoted to the post of Kenseikai Secretary General and led the party in the general election of May 1924. The Kenseikai won a plurality of the seats, and Takaaki Kato set up his first cabinet with the support of the so-called "three groups protecting the constitution", the Kenseikai, the Rikken Seiyukai, and the Kakushin Club.

When Hamaguchi Osachi, who Miki had looked up to for a long time, took office as Finance Minister, Miki was appointed the Ministry's parliamentary councillor under Hamaguchi's tutelage. In 1927 he joined the Rikken Minseito under Hamaguchi's leadership and, at the same time, went on a tour of Europe. Thus, Miki had reached the pinnacle of his pre-war political career when a disaster befell him. In 1928, he was implicated in a case of bribery by Keisei Railway of the Tokyo municipal government, was convicted in court, and, for the time being, ended up leaving politics.

=== World War II ===
In 1939, he became president of the newspaper firm Hochi Shimbun. He returned to politics in 1942, winning election as an independent candidate in that year's general election. In the election, Ichiro Hatoyama also won office as an unaligned candidate. Before the war Miki and Hatoyama had been leading members of rival parties, the Rikken Minseito and the Rikken Seiyukai. However, in wartime, they were both defenders of liberalism who together resisted the military authorities, even if in the end they were both compelled to affiliate with the Imperial Rule Assistance Political Association. At that time, Hatoyama and Miki made a pact to form a government one day, with Hatoyama as prime minister and Miki as Speaker of the House of Representatives. In August 1942, Hochi Shimbun was bought out by Yomiuri Shimbun.

After the war, he took part in planning the establishment of the Liberal Party. In the elections of April 1946 the Liberal Party won a plurality, and it seemed like a real possibility that Hatoyama would become prime minister, but the formation of the cabinet fell through at the last minute when Hatoyama was purged by the US occupation authorities. Shigeru Yoshida became President of the Liberal Party in Hatoyama's stead.

Because Yoshida still disliked the pre-war politicians for having been deferent to the military, he selected his cabinet in private consultation with his close advisor, Joji Hayashi without discussing the matter with senior members of the Liberal Party, including Miki, who was Chairman of the Executive Council, and Secretary General Ichiro Kono. The party leadership was furious, some even demanding Yoshida's removal from the party presidency, but Miki managed to calm them down by pointing out that if they withdrew their support from Yoshida, then power would likely pass to the Socialist Party.

Then, on 24 May 1946, two days after the formation of Yoshida's first cabinet, Miki was also purged.

== The fall of Yoshida and ascension of Hatoyama ==
On 24 June 1951, when the ban on holding office was lifted for those purged, Miki began seeking to have Prime Minister Yoshida removed in cooperation with Ichiro Kono and Hatoyama. The three were reinstated in the Liberal Party, but by now the party was completely controlled by the "Yoshida school," which was directly allied with the Prime Minister, and a promise Yoshida had made to hand back power to Hatoyama after his return had been effectively annulled.

Miki, Hatoyama, and Kono thus moved towards founding a new political party. However, Hatoyama suffered a stroke, and the plan fell through. Miki changed course in favor of undermining Yoshida from within the Liberal Party. Operating behind the scenes, Miki devoted himself to all manner of schemes and became the leader of the anti-Yoshida movement. To combat this, Yoshida took the advice of his political adviser, Tsuruhei Matsuno, and jolted the pro-Hatoyama faction by calling a snap election in August 1952. On the recommendation of Kozen Hirokawa, Yoshida also expelled both Ichiro Kono and Tanzan Ishibashi from the Liberal Party on the basis of their opposition to his leadership. The fact that Miki Bukichi, the central dissident, was not expelled was said to be due to the debt of gratitude Yoshida felt to him for saving his first cabinet in 1946.

The Liberal Party won a majority government in the elections, and Yoshida formed his fourth cabinet. The remainder of the pro-Hatoyama faction constituted the "Democratization League", essentially an opposition party operating within the ruling party. The Democratization League absented itself from the Diet when a motion of censure was tabled by the opposition parties against Minister of International Trade and Industry Hayato Ikeda for his gaffe, "The bankruptcy and suicide of one or two small businessmen can't be avoided." The motion passed, and Ikeda resigned.

In December 1952, the Democratization League ratcheted up the pressure on Yoshida against the backdrop of the passage of the revised draft budget. Next year, at the same time as the League arranged for Kono and Ishibashi to re-join the party, it forced the resignations of Secretary General Joji Hayashi and Chairman of the Executive Council Shuji Masutani, who were key allies of Prime Minister Yoshida. Miki was appointed Masutani's successor in the party's Executive Council. Seeking to throw the Liberal Party establishment into disarray, Miki drove a wedge between Yoshida and his ally Kozen Hirokawa by putting the idea into his head that Yoshida intended to make Taketora Ogata his successor. Then Miki slyly proposed to the Yoshida camp that Hirokawa be elevated to the position of Secretary General, presenting Yoshida with a no-win scenario in which he could either accede to the request and allow Miki to manipulate the party through Hirokawa, or refuse the request and further alienate him. In the end, Hirokawa was not made Secretary General, and his behind-the-scenes split with Yoshida became definitive.

On 28 February 1953 Yoshida responded to a question from the rightist socialist representative Eiichi Nishimura by calling him a "stupid fool" in the Diet. Miki discussed the matter behind closed doors with the leader of the Rightist Socialist Party, Inejiro Asanuma. Asanuma was considering a motion of no-confidence against the government, but Miki changed his mind, and Asanuma agreed instead to table a disciplinary action against the Prime Minister himself. Miki also brought Takeo Miki together with Tadao Oasa and Kenzō Matsumura, who were veteran politicians from before the war, and reached an understanding with them, and even arranged for Hirokawa's 30-man faction to abstain from the vote. Thus, the disciplinary action was approved.

Miki then talked reluctant opposition parties into tabling a motion of no-confidence against the government and entered talks with Yoshida while using the motion as a bargaining chip to urge the beleaguered Prime Minister to resign. Yoshida nevertheless turned Miki down and the Democratization League's 22 members separated from the Liberal Party. With their backing, on 14 March 1953, the House of Representatives passed the motion of no-confidence with 229 votes in favor versus 218 against. Hirokawa and 16 of his followers then also split with the Liberal Party to form the Separatist Liberal Party.

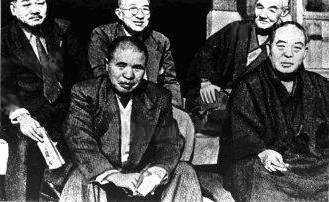
Ultranationalist criminal Yoshio Kodama in January 1953 during a visit by politicians Ichirō Hatoyama and Bukichi Miki to his Tokyo estate. The photo was published in 1953 in Mainichi Shimbun.

Yoshida immediately dissolved the House and in the elections his Liberals won 199 seats, a loss of 23, but held onto their status as the first party. The separatists attained only 35 seats. In November, half a year from the election, Yoshida and Hatoyama met, and most of the separatists who were loyal to Hatoyama re-joined the Liberal Party. Only eight men refused to return, Bukichi Miki, Ichiro Kono, Takechiyo Matsuda, To Matsunaga, Umekichi Nakamura, Shinjiro Yamamura, Masanosuke Ikeda, and Kaku Ando, who together called themselves the Japan Liberal Party. Others called them "The Eight Samurai", in reference to the new movie The Seven Samurai.

In January 1954 con-man Masutomi Ito was exposed for perpetrating mass investment fraud, a scheme that eventually led investigators to a ring of shipbuilders who were bribing politicians in exchange for subsidies. Liberal Party Secretary General Eisaku Satō and Political Affairs Research Committee head Hayato Ikeda were suspected of involvement. A few days earlier, Yoshida's Liberals had met with the Reform Party and the Separatist Liberal Party and held negotiations with representatives of each party in the hopes of unifying the three right-leaning parties. When the talks fell through, Miki saw his chance and linked up with Hatoyama and Nobusuke Kishi of the Liberal Party, as well as Reform Party members Takeo Miki and Tadao Oasa, to seek the establishment of a new anti-Yoshida political party. In November 1954, the Democratic Party was constituted with Hatoyama as president, Kishi as Secretary General, and Miki as Chairman of the Executive Council.

Next month Yoshida's cabinet finally resigned en masse, and Hatoyama became prime minister. Half of Miki's long-held ambition for a government with Hatoyama as prime minister and himself as Speaker of the House of Representatives had been achieved. However, when the House elected its speaker immediately following the general elections, all the parties except Miki's Democratic Party banded together and put forward Liberal Party member Shuji Masutani as their joint candidate. Because of this, Miki, the candidate of the governing party who was expected to be elected as a matter of course, ended up being defeated, and his dream came to nothing.

== The "conservative merger" ==
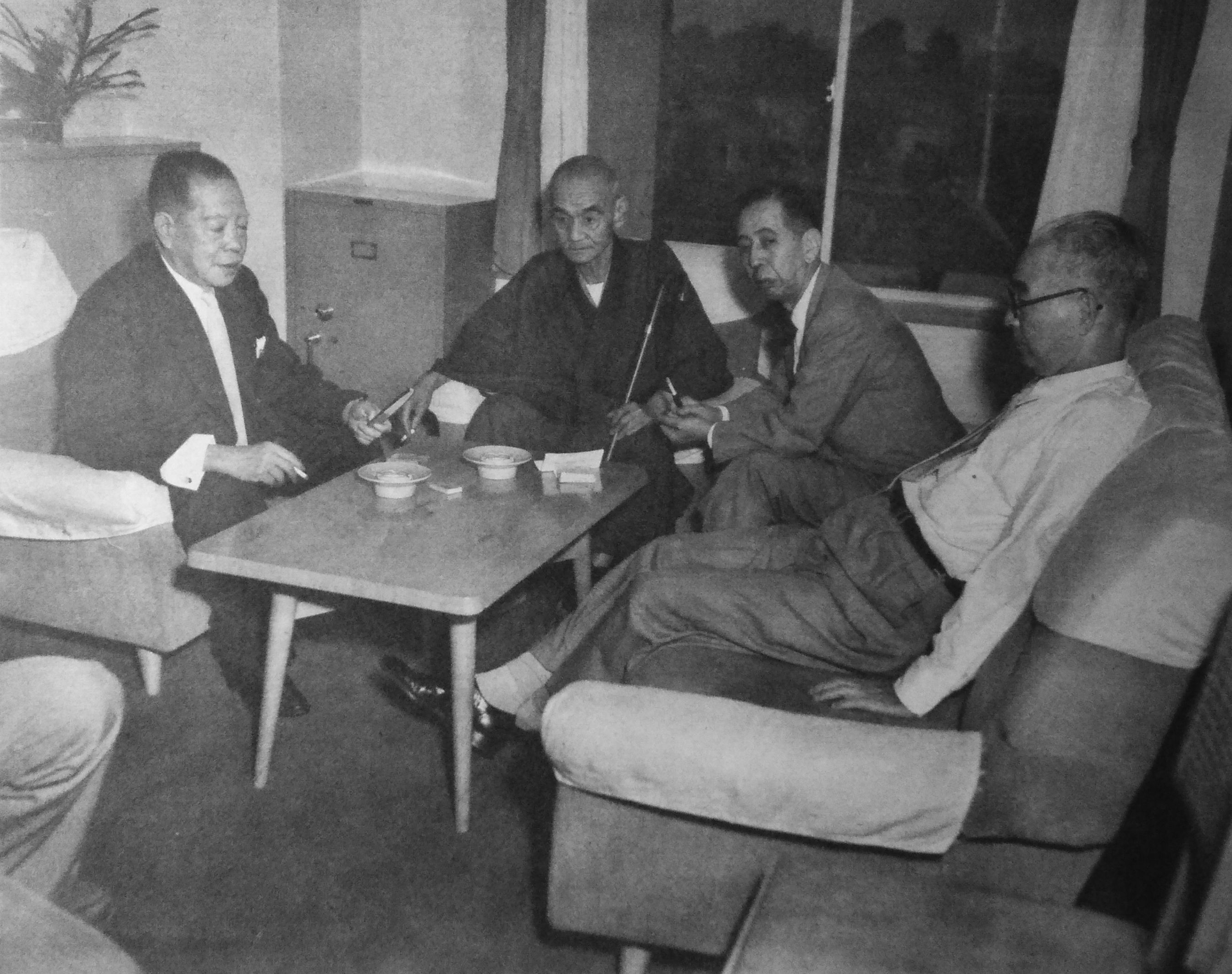
Conservative leaders meet to plot the merger of the Liberal and Democratic parties in July 1955. From left to right: Banboku Ōno, Bukichi Miki, Nobusuke Kishi, Mitsujirō Ishii

On 13 April 1955 Miki called upon the right-wing political parties to rally together and announced that should rivalries with the Hatoyama cabinet become an obstacle to the merger, the government was prepared to resign en masse. At this point Miki had been fretting over the unification of the Leftist Socialist Party with its rivals, the Rightist Socialists and had also been told by his doctor that he had contracted cancer and would live no more than three years.

At the same time as Miki was striving to reach consensus in the Democratic Party, he engaged in manoeuvres within the Liberal Party. On 15 May 1955 he met with Banboku Ōno, the Chairman of the Executive Council of the Liberal Party. Ōno had once been a close aide to Hatoyama but was superseded by Miki even though Miki had previously been Hatoyama's political enemy, and for that reason despised Miki more than anyone else. Even so, Miki pleaded with Ōno and won his support by cleverly appealing to his strong sense of patriotism. A meeting was then held between Miki and Kishi and their Liberal Party counterparts, Banboku Ōno and Mitsujirō Ishii, and they officially began the process of merging their parties. On the other hand, Takeo Miki and Kenzō Matsumura, leaders of the Reform Party, responded by arguing that conservatives should have two parties rather than just one. As the debate was coming to a close, Hatoyama blurted out while weeping that his cabinet would have to resign, and panicking at the prospect, they ended up backing the merger.

But the final fight over who should be president of the new party was no less difficult. As a result, they put the presidency on the back burner and set up an interim presidential committee, agreeing to choose the president through an election after the party had been formed. Thus, the difficult conservative merger was completed, and Japan's first unified right-wing party, the Liberal Democratic Party, was born. Miki, Hatoyama, Onō, and Taketora Ogata made up the interim presidential committee, and five months later, Hatoyama was inaugurated as party president. The party had been formed while leaving the most vexatious conflicts unresolved, and Miki is well known for his assessment that it "would be lucky to last two or three years".

== Death ==
Miki was bedridden from April 1956, and his condition gradually worsened. On 4 July he died at his home in Meguro, Tokyo. The cause of death was stomach cancer. He was 71 years old.

A bronze statue of Miki was constructed near Ritsurin Garden in his hometown of Takamatsu.

== Famous statements and retorts ==
During the 1917 general elections, in which Miki would be elected for the first time, the Rikken Seiyukai candidate Zenshiro Tsuboya said of Miki in a speech, "I'm not going to name names, but there is a certain candidate who has two years' worth of unpaid rent. He even owes more than one year's worth of debt to the rice merchant. Can such a man really discuss state affairs at the podium of parliament as a representative of our nation? I believe that such a candidate in these circumstances should gracefully decline to run for office." At the next town hall meeting, Miki hit back, saying, "I've heard that a certain candidate has been going around attacking as disgraceful the fact that a man with debts is running for office. That debt-ridden candidate is I, the humble Bukichi Miki. Because I am poor, I am in debt. Though he was just called a rice merchant, that man is the rice merchant, Mr. Yamashita from Yamabuki. It was said that I owe him more than one year's worth of debt, but that's not correct. Actually, I owe him more than two years' worth of debt. I also owe rent, but not two years' worth. To be more precise, the situation is that my landlord has been waiting for payment for more than three years. I want to correct this misinformation about me right now!" The room burst into laughter and applause, and one person shouted, "Nice one, debt king!" Miki's landlord and the rice merchant Tatsujiro Yamashita were also present at the meeting, and after that they both stood up at Miki's urging. Yamashita said, "I am the rice merchant Yamashita. How about it everyone? Will you please support Mr. Miki?" That was the last time the stunned Zenshiro Tsuboya would bring up Miki's debts.

During the 43rd session of the Imperial Diet, which began on 29 June 1920, Korekiyo Takahashi, the Finance Minister in Takashi Hara's cabinet, who went by the nickname "Daruma", was in the process of explaining the naval budget. When Takahashi said "We will make this into a long-term plan of ten years for the army and eight years for the navy", Miki shouted out, "Nine years for Daruma!" This was a very witty statement using the story of the Buddhist monk Daruma Daishi who faced a wall in China's Shaolin Monastery and, after doing zen meditation for nine years, achieved enlightenment. The assemblymen burst into laughter, and Takahashi also stopped speaking, looked back at Prime Minister Hara in the ministers' gallery, and smiled wryly. Even Takaaki Kato and Osachi Hamaguchi, up to then well known for their stoic seriousness, famously cracked up in their seats. Also during the time when Hara was serving as prime minister, a cabinet minister was explaining the aims of a proposed piece of legislation in a somber and monotone voice, as if reading a sutra. When the session adjourned, Miki jeered "Next, we may burn the incense", and the assembly burst out laughing.

At a meeting of MPs from the Imperial Rule Assistance Political Association for deciding party policy towards the Tojo cabinet's Corporate Restructuring Bill, Seigo Nakano pointed at the senior members of the IRAPA and remarked, "Swarming around the center of power, I see only sycophants. This will in the end lead to the destruction of our country. The people who are leading Japan astray are all the bootlickers in the IRAPA." When the mainstream IRAPA members booed Nakano, Miki abruptly stood up and famously shouted, "Shut up, all you bootlickers!", and the hecklers immediately fell silent.

At a speaking event Miki attended during the general elections of 1952, a rival office-seeker, Toshichi Fuke, said of Miki: "After the war, we achieved equal rights for men and women, but even so, one big-shot candidate keeps four mistresses! Is such an immoral man qualified to be involved in national politics?" Miki was the next one up to the podium, and he replied: "The person that the impotent candidate who stands before me calls a 'big-shot candidate' is the humble Bukichi Miki. What Bukichi Miki is thinking is, would you all prefer to give your one precious vote to this pitifully weak candidate, or to a big-shot like me? What's more, because I must strive for accuracy, I will go ahead and correct the mathematical errors of the aforementioned weak candidate right now. It was said that I have four mistresses, but actually I have five. Confusing four with five ought to be considered shameful, even for a first grader. It seems like he failed to count one. However, all these women have now become old maids and aren't of use to me anymore. Even so, Bukichi Miki could never do something so inhumane as abandon them! Even today, I care for them all." The crowd roared with laughter and approval. Miki kept his five mistresses up to his death, who lived with him and cared for his wife Kaneko. However, he was also a loving husband who had stated, "The one for whom I have never stopped feeling true affection is definitely my wife Kaneko. It's just that I happened to fall in love with other women."

While Miki was serving as Chairman of the Executive Council of the Democratic Party, the Shiun Maru disaster occurred, a deadly collision between two Japanese National Railways ferries, resulting in the resignation of JNR President Sonosuke Nagasaki. Miki proposed Shinji Sogo, who had a long career as a bureaucrat in the pre-war Japanese Government Railways, to fill his shoes, and met him personally to persuade him. At the meeting, Miki aggressively approached the wavering Sogo and said, "Our railway department, which has always been like a home to you, is probably on the verge of collapse due to these scandals. Are you so disloyal that you won't even try to stand and fight for your homeland when called upon?" This led Sogo to answer, "I will never be a traitor!" and convinced him to take up the post.

== See also ==
- Liberal Democratic Party (Japan)

== Bibliography ==
- Yo Mizuki, 誠心誠意, 噓をつく: 自民党を生んだ男・三木武吉の生涯 (Tokyo: Nihon Keizai Shinbunsha, 2005).

Party political offices
Preceded by New political party	President of the Liberal Democratic Party; 1955-1956, Served alongside: Ichiro Hatoyama, Taketora Ogata, Banboku Ōno	Succeeded by Ichiro Hatoyama
Preceded by New political party	Chairman of the Executive Council of the Democratic Party; 1954-1955	Succeeded by "conservative merger" with Liberal Party
Preceded by New political party	Chairman of the Executive Council of the Liberal Party; 1945-1946	Succeeded by Shigeru Yoshida
Preceded by Shoju Koyama	Secretary General of the Kenseikai; 1924-1925	Succeeded by Takeji Yatsunami
