= Mochizuki Keisuke =

Japanese politician (1867–1941)

- 望月 圭介
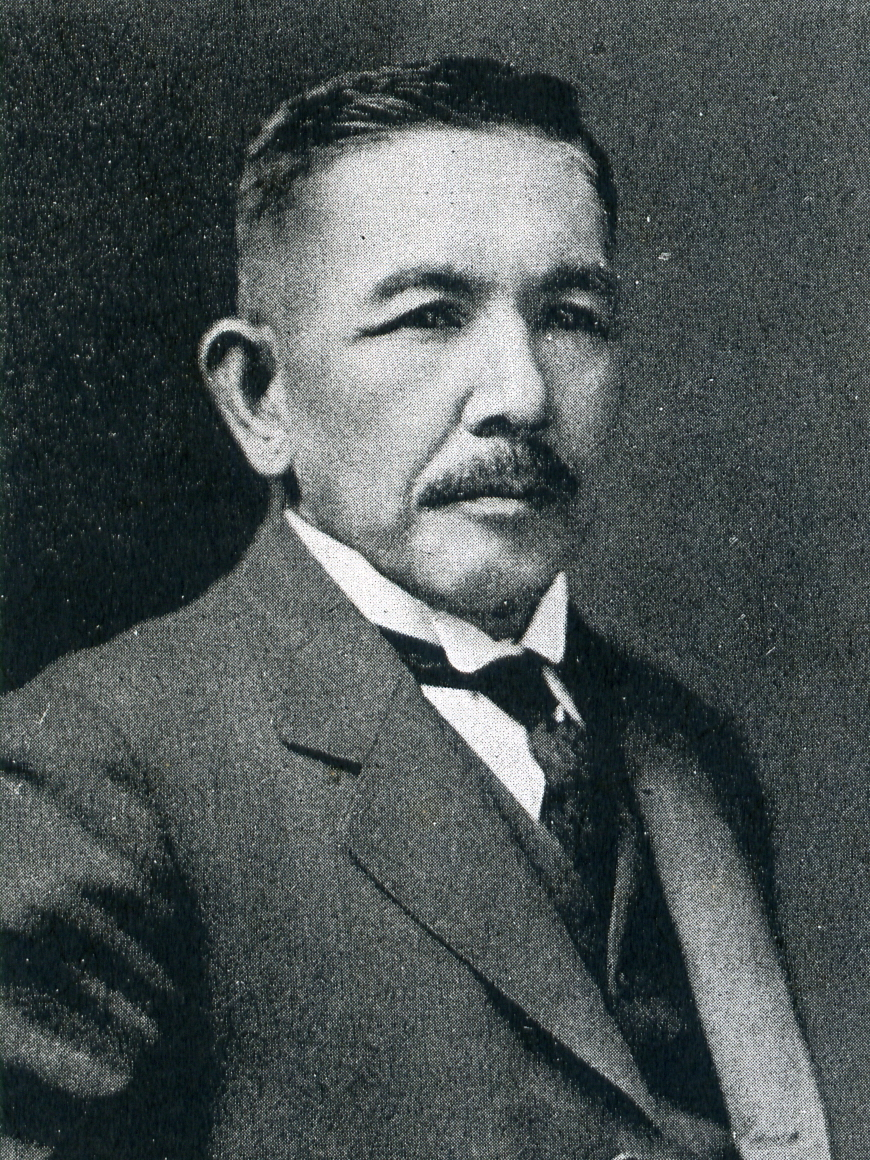
- Mochizuki in 1932

Minister of Communications
- In office 12 September 1935 – 9 March 1936
- Prime Minister: Keisuke Okada
- Preceded by: Okada Keisuke
- Succeeded by: Tanomogi Keikichi
- In office 20 April 1927 – 23 May 1928
- Prime Minister: Tanaka Giichi
- Preceded by: Adachi Kenzō
- Succeeded by: Fusanosuke Kuhara

Minister of Home Affairs
- In office 23 May 1928 – 2 July 1929
- Prime Minister: Tanaka Giichi
- Preceded by: Tanaka Giichi
- Succeeded by: Adachi Kenzō

Member of the House of Representatives; from Hiroshima
- In office 27 November 1912 – 1 January 1941
- Preceded by: Kuwabara Ijūrō
- Succeeded by: Mitsugu Tanaka
- Constituency: Counties district (1912–1920); 9th district (1920–1928); 2nd district (1928–1941)
- In office 27 March 1908 – 14 May 1912
- Constituency: Counties district
- In office 1 March 1903 – 11 December 1903
- Constituency: Counties district
- In office 10 August 1898 – 9 August 1902
- Preceded by: Yamakage Shizuo
- Succeeded by: Constituency abolished
- Constituency: 6th district

Personal details
- Born: 1 April 1867 Ōsakikamijima, Aki, Japan
- Died: 1 January 1941 (aged 73) Harajuku, Tokyo, Japan
- Resting place: Tama Cemetery
- Party: Rikken Seiyūkai (1900–1935; 1937–1940)
- Other political affiliations: Liberal (1898); Kenseitō (1898–1900); Shōwakai (1935–1937); Independent (1940–1941)

Mochizuki Keisuke (望月 圭介; 1 April 1867 – 1 January 1941) was a Japanese politician active during the Taishō and early Shōwa periods. He served twice as Minister of Communications (1927–1928, 1935–1936) and once as Minister of Home Affairs (1928–1929). In the latter position, he oversaw increased prosecution of members of the Japanese Communist Party under the Peace Preservation Law.

== Biography ==
Mochizuki was born on Ōsakikamijima, an island in the Seto Inland Sea, now part of Hiroshima Prefecture, where his father was an entrepreneur and ship owner. He went to Tokyo when he was age 13 and studied the English language, returning at age 17 to assist in the family business. However, he soon became interested in politics and was affiliated with the early Liberal Party of Japan. He was elected to the House of Representatives in the 1898 Japanese general election, and was subsequently reelected from the same district 13 times.

In his early career, Mochizuki spoke out strongly against factionalism in the Diet based on old clan-based affiliations. He later joined the Kenseitō political party, but was recruited as one of the founding members of the Rikken Seiyūkai by Itō Hirobumi in 1900. He rose to a high rank within the party, eventually serving as secretary-general during the administration of Prime Minister Hara Kei.

Mochizuki first joined the Cabinet under the Tanaka Giichi Cabinet in 1927 as Minister of Communications. The following year, he was appointed Home Minister.

During his term as Home Minister, renewed activity by underground Japan Communist Party in 1928 led to the March 15 incident, in which police arrested more than 1,600 communists and suspected communists under the provisions of the 1925 Peace Preservation Law. The same year, he pushed through an amendment to the law, raising the maximum penalty from ten years to death.

Also while Home Minister in 1927, Mochizuki responded to a petition by pioneering Japanese feminist Shidzue Katō on women's suffrage by telling her to go home to wash her baby's diapers, as the place for women is in the home.

However, Mochizuki broke with the Seiyūkai in 1934, forming the short-lived Showa-kai party in 1935. He returned to the cabinet as Minister of Communications from 1935–1936, and served as a Cabinet councilor during the Yonai Cabinet in 1940.

Mochizuki died just before the start of the Pacific War. His birthplace in Ōsakikamijima has been preserved as a museum. His grave is at the Tama Cemetery.

== Notes ==
Political offices
Preceded by Okada Keisuke	Minister of Communications; 12 Sep 1935 – 9 Mar 1936	Succeeded by Tanomogi Keikichi
Preceded by Tanaka Giichi	Home Minister; 23 May 1928 – 2 July 1929	Succeeded by Adachi Kenzō
Preceded by Adachi Kenzō	Minister of Communications; 20 April 1927 – 23 May 1928	Succeeded by Fusanosuke Kuhara
