= Hayami Seiji =

Japanese politician

Junior Third Rank Hayami Seiji
- 早速 整爾
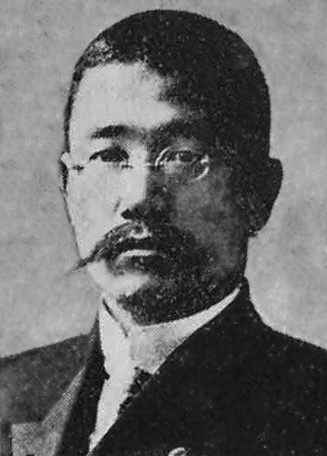

Minister of Finance
- In office 3 June 1926 – 13 September 1926
- Prime Minister: Wakatsuki Reijirō
- Preceded by: Hamaguchi Osachi
- Succeeded by: Kataoka Naoharu

Minister of Agriculture and Forestry
- In office 2 August 1925 – 3 June 1926
- Prime Minister: Katō Takaaki; Wakatsuki Reijirō
- Preceded by: Okazaki Kunisuke
- Succeeded by: Machida Chūji

Vice Speaker of the House of Representatives
- In office 26 December 1915 – 25 January 1917
- Speaker: Shimada Saburō
- Preceded by: Takuzō Hanai
- Succeeded by: Kunimatsu Hamada

Member of the House of Representatives; from Hiroshima
- In office 28 July 1909 – 13 September 1926
- Preceded by: Kōzō Kushimoto
- Succeeded by: Eikichi Etō
- Constituency: Hiroshima City (1909–1912); Counties district (1912–1915); Hiroshima City (1915–1920); 1st district (1920–1926)
- In office 1 March 1904 – 27 March 1908
- Preceded by: Kōzō Kushimoto
- Succeeded by: Kōzō Kushimoto
- Constituency: Hiroshima City
- In office 10 August 1902 – 28 December 1902
- Preceded by: Constituency established
- Succeeded by: Kōzō Kushimoto
- Constituency: Hiroshima City

Personal details
- Born: 15 November 1868 Shinjo, Aki, Japan
- Died: 13 September 1926 (aged 57) Kamakura, Kanagawa, Japan
- Party: Kenseikai (1916–1926)
- Other political affiliations: Independent (1902–1908; 1910–1913); Yūshinkai (1908–1910); Chūseikai (1913–1916)
- Education: Waseda University

Hayami Seiji (Japanese: 早速 整爾) was a Japanese politician during the Taishō era.

== Career ==
Hayami was Parliamentary Vice-Minister for Finance. In August 1925, he replaced Okazaki Kunisuke as Minister of Agriculture and Forestry in Katō Takaaki's second cabinet. He left the post in January 1926, after Katō's death.

Political offices
Preceded by Okazaki Kunisuke	Minister of Agriculture and Forestry; 2 August 1925 – 30 January 1926	Succeeded by Machida Chūji
Preceded by Hamaguchi Osachi	Minister of Finance; 3 June 1926 – 13 September 1926	Succeeded by Kataoka Naoharu
