= Hamaguchi Osachi =

Japanese politician

Senior Second Rank Hamaguchi Osachi
- 濱口 雄幸
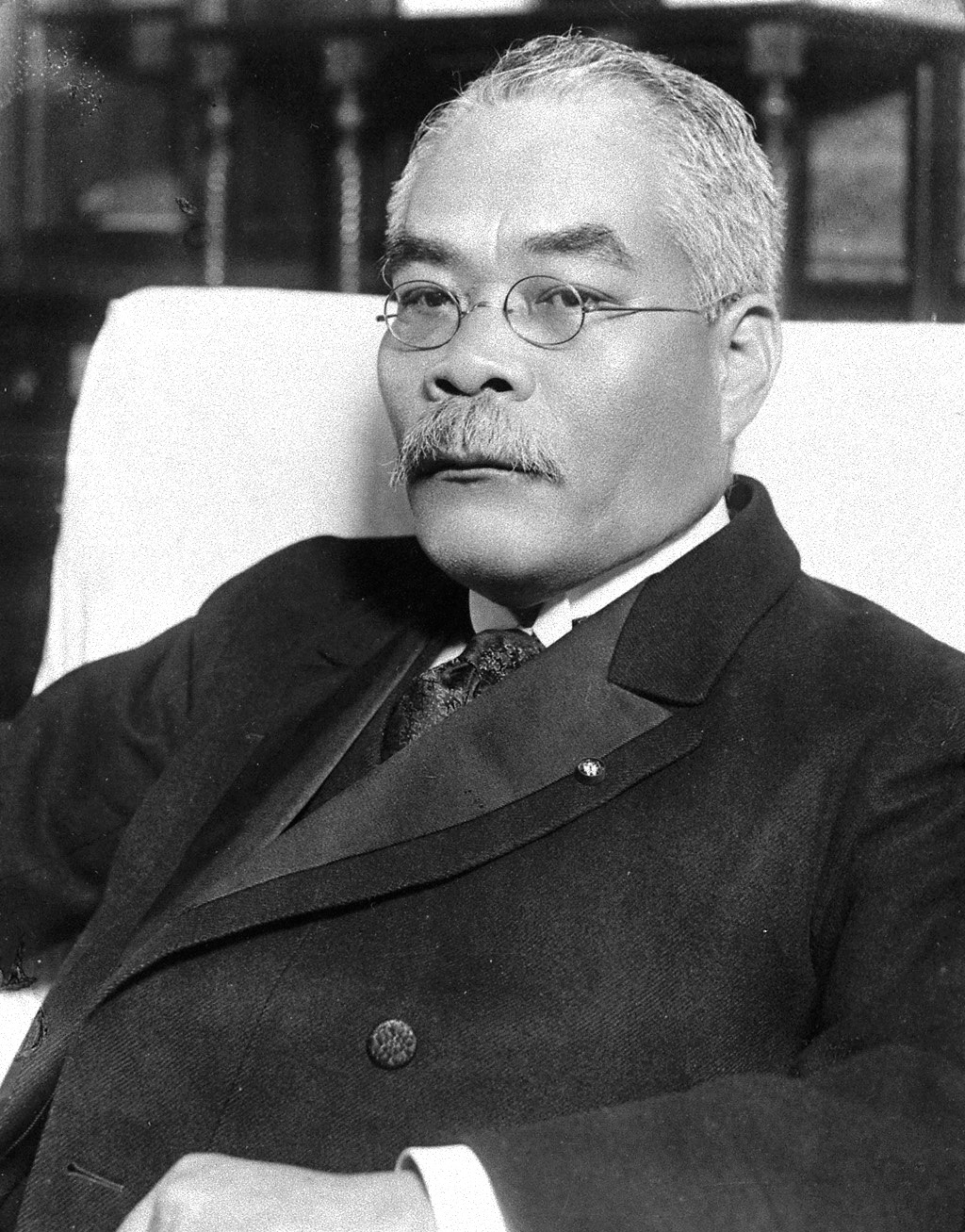

Prime Minister of Japan
- In office 2 July 1929 – 14 April 1931 (Note: Incapacitated from 14 November 1930 to 9 March 1931; Foreign Minister Kijūrō Shidehara served as acting Prime Minister.)
- Monarch: Shōwa
- Preceded by: Tanaka Giichi
- Succeeded by: Wakatsuki Reijirō

President of the Rikken Minseitō
- In office 1 June 1927 – 13 April 1931
- Preceded by: Position established
- Succeeded by: Wakatsuki Reijirō

Minister of Home Affairs
- In office 3 June 1926 – 20 April 1927
- Prime Minister: Wakatsuki Reijirō
- Preceded by: Wakatsuki Reijirō
- Succeeded by: Suzuki Kisaburō

Minister of Finance
- In office 11 June 1924 – 3 June 1926
- Prime Minister: Katō Takaaki; Wakatsuki Reijirō
- Preceded by: Kazue Shōda
- Succeeded by: Hayami Seiji

Member of the House of Representatives
- In office 26 March 1919 – 26 August 1931
- Preceded by: Shiraishi Naoji
- Succeeded by: Minoru Tamura
- Constituency: Kōchi Counties (1919–1920); Kōchi 2nd (1920–1928); Kōchi 1st (1928–1931)
- In office 25 March 1915 – 25 January 1917
- Preceded by: Mitsumori Tokuji
- Succeeded by: Nakano Torajirō
- Constituency: Kōchi City

Personal details
- Born: 1 April 1870 Nagaoka, Kōchi, Japan
- Died: 26 August 1931 (aged 61) Koishikawa, Tokyo, Japan
- Cause of death: Gunshot wound
- Resting place: Aoyama Cemetery
- Party: Rikken Minseitō (1927–1931)
- Other political affiliations: Rikken Dōshikai (1913–1916); Kenseikai (1916–1927)
- Spouse: Natsu Hamaguchi (m. 1889)
- Relatives: Yasumasa Narasaki (grandson-in-law)
- Education: Tokyo Imperial University
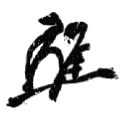
- Signature

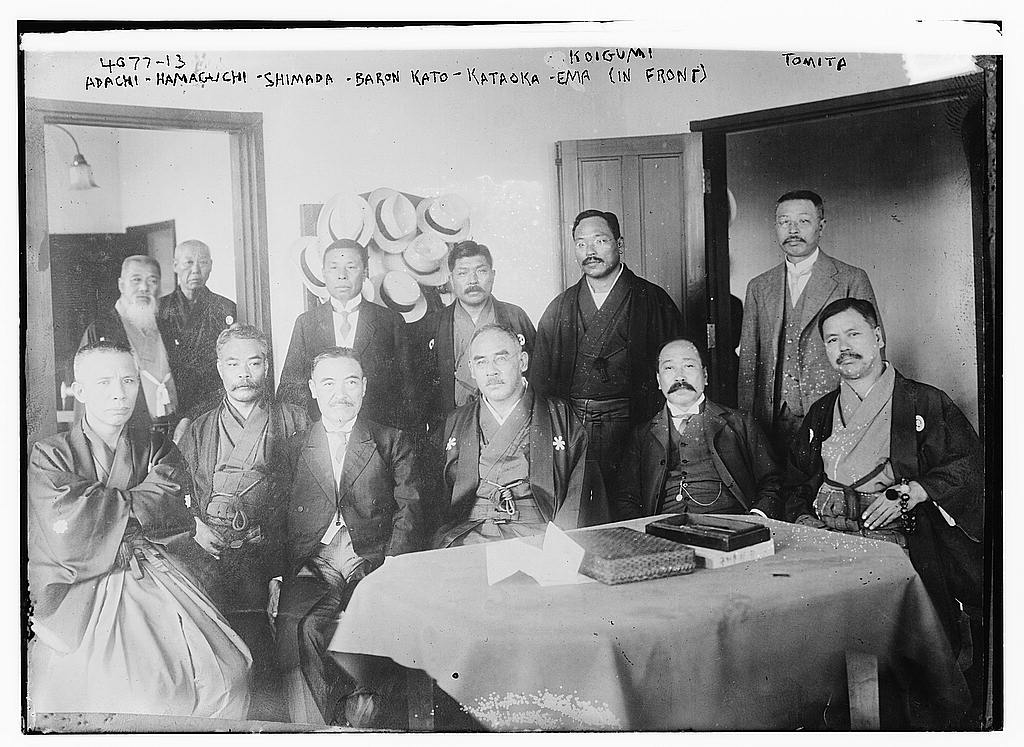
Adachi Kenzō, Osachi Hamaguchi, Toshio Shimada, Baron Kato, Kataoka Naoharu, and Ema Koigumi in 1916

Hamaguchi Osachi (Kyūjitai: 濱口 雄幸; Shinjitai: 浜口 雄幸, 1 April 1870 – 26 August 1931) was a Japanese politician who served as Prime Minister of Japan from 1929 to 1931. Nicknamed the "Lion Prime Minister" (ライオン宰相, Raion Saishō) due to his dignified demeanor and mane-like hair, Hamaguchi served as leading member of the liberal Rikken Minseitō (Constitutional Democratic Party) during the "Taishō Democracy" of interwar Japan. He was a member of the House of Representatives from 1915 until his death. He initially survived an assassination attempt by a right-wing extremist in 1930, but died about nine months later from a bacterial infection in his unhealed wounds.

== Early life and career ==
Hamaguchi was born in Nagaoka District, Tosa Province (now part of Kōchi city, Kōchi Prefecture on the island of Shikoku). He was the third son of Minaguchi Tanehira, an official in the local forestry department, and took the Hamaguchi name on his marriage to Hamaguchi Natsuko in 1889.

Hamaguchi graduated from the Law College of Tokyo Imperial University in 1895 and began his career as a bureaucrat in the Ministry of Finance.

In 1907, he rose to the position of Director of the Monopoly Bureau. He became Vice Communications Minister in 1912 and Vice Finance Minister in 1914.

== Political career ==
Hamaguchi joined the Rikken Dōshikai political party led by Katō Takaaki in 1915, which became the Kenseikai in 1916. Hamaguchi was elected to the lower house in the Japanese Diet in 1915 from the Kōchi Second District, and was to hold onto this seat until his death in 1931.

In June 1924, Hamaguchi served as Finance Minister under the Katō Takaaki Cabinet, holding the same portfolio under the First Wakatsuki Cabinet from January to June 1926. As Finance Minister, he pursued fiscal retrenchment, and proposed reducing government spending by 17 percent and laying off tens of thousands of government workers; however, his policies had to be scaled considerably back due to strenuous opposition from government bureaucrats.

Hamaguchi was subsequently Home Minister in the Wakatsuki cabinet from June 1926 to April 1927. In a continuation of his efforts while as Finance Minister, Hamaguchi promoted a moral campaign through sponsorship of movies which emphasized thrift and reduced public consumption, with the goal of helping reduce Japan's trade deficit.

In 1927, Hamaguchi became the chairman of the new Rikken Minseitō political party formed by the merger of the Kenseikai and the Seiyūhontō.

== Premiership (1929–1931) ==
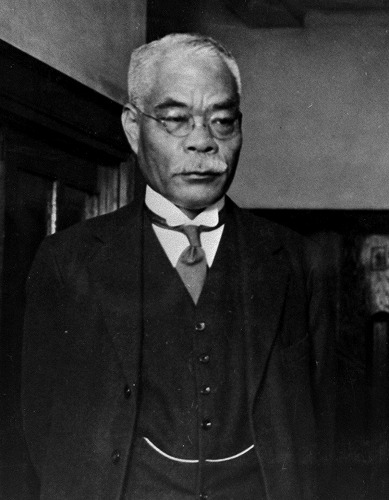
- Hamaguchi, before 1931
- Premiership of Hamaguchi Osachi; 2 July 1929 – 14 April 1931
- Monarch: Emperor Shōwa
- Cabinet: Hamaguchi Cabinet
- Party: Rikken Minseitō
- Election: 1930
- Seat: Naikaku Sōri Daijin Kantei
- Constituency: Kōchi 1st
- Emblem of the Government of Japan

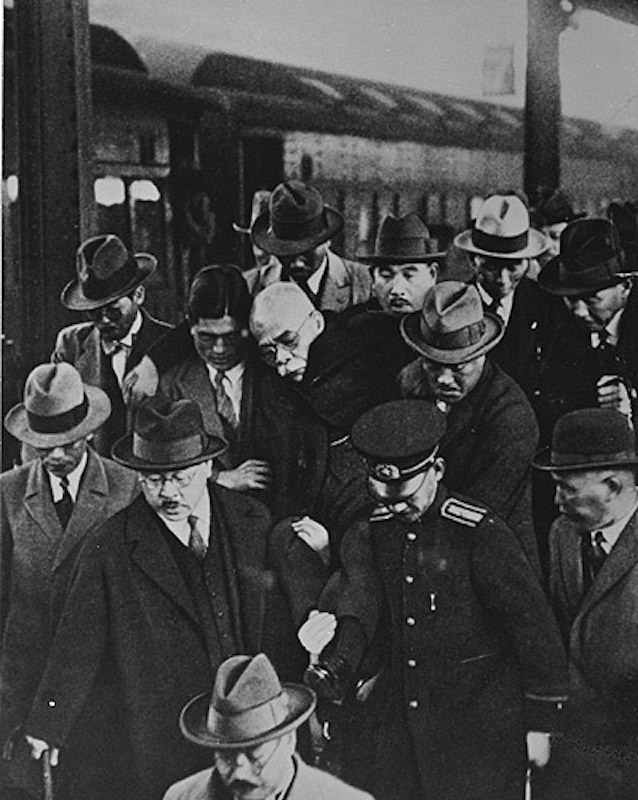
Assassination attempt on Hamaguchi Osachi inside Tokyo Station, 14 November 1930

After the collapse of the administration of Tanaka Giichi in June 1929, Hamaguchi was selected to become Prime Minister of Japan and formed a cabinet based largely on Minseitō party members, which supported domestic economic reforms over overseas military adventurism. With a strong sense of his own rectitude and a tough, stubborn temperament, Hamaguchi inspired trust, promising that he was "ready to die if necessary" for the good of the country during his inaugural speech and promising an administration free of corruption.

Hamaguchi's primary concern was the Japanese economy, which had been in an ever-increasing recession since the end of World War I, and had been greatly weakened by the devastation caused by the 1923 Great Kantō earthquake. Hamaguchi promoted retrenchment, deflation and the rationalization of industry. The 1929 Great Depression, starting soon after he took office, put further pressure on the economy.

Initial public confidence and strong support from Emperor Hirohito and his entourage, including the genrō Saionji Kinmochi allowed Hamaguchi to implement fiscal austerity measures, which included ratification of the London Naval Treaty of 1930, which curtailed military spending. However, his measures to help stimulate exports, such as returning the Japanese yen to the gold standard, proved disastrous.

The failure of Hamaguchi's economic policies played into the hands of right-wing elements, already enraged by the government's conciliatory foreign policies and Japan's increasing unemployment problems. The opposition Rikken Seiyūkai joined forces with the vocal anti-Treaty faction within the Imperial Japanese Navy to accuse Hamaguchi of infringing of the military's "right of supreme command" as guaranteed under the Meiji Constitution.

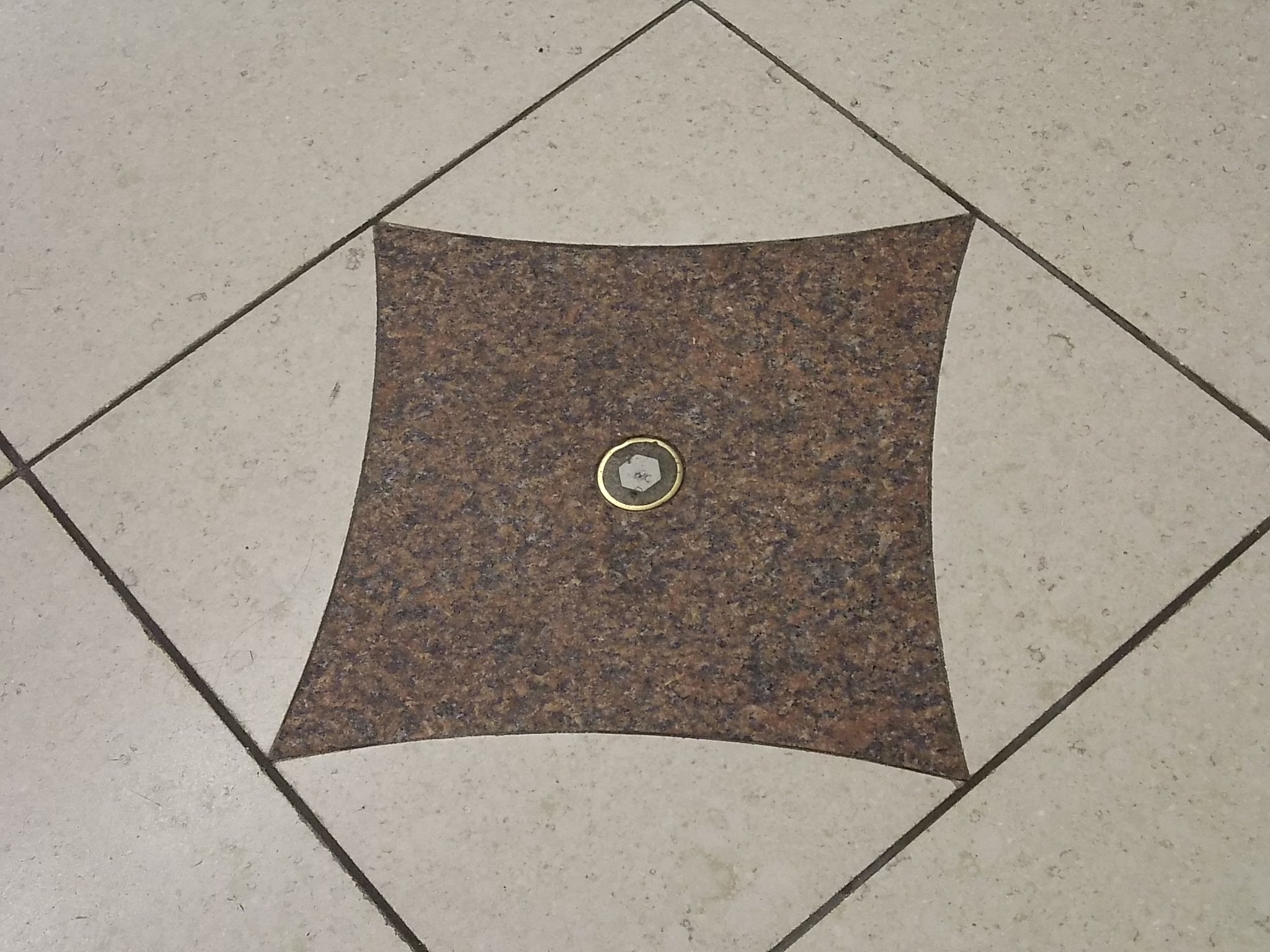
The spot at Tokyo Station where Osachi Hamaguchi was shot

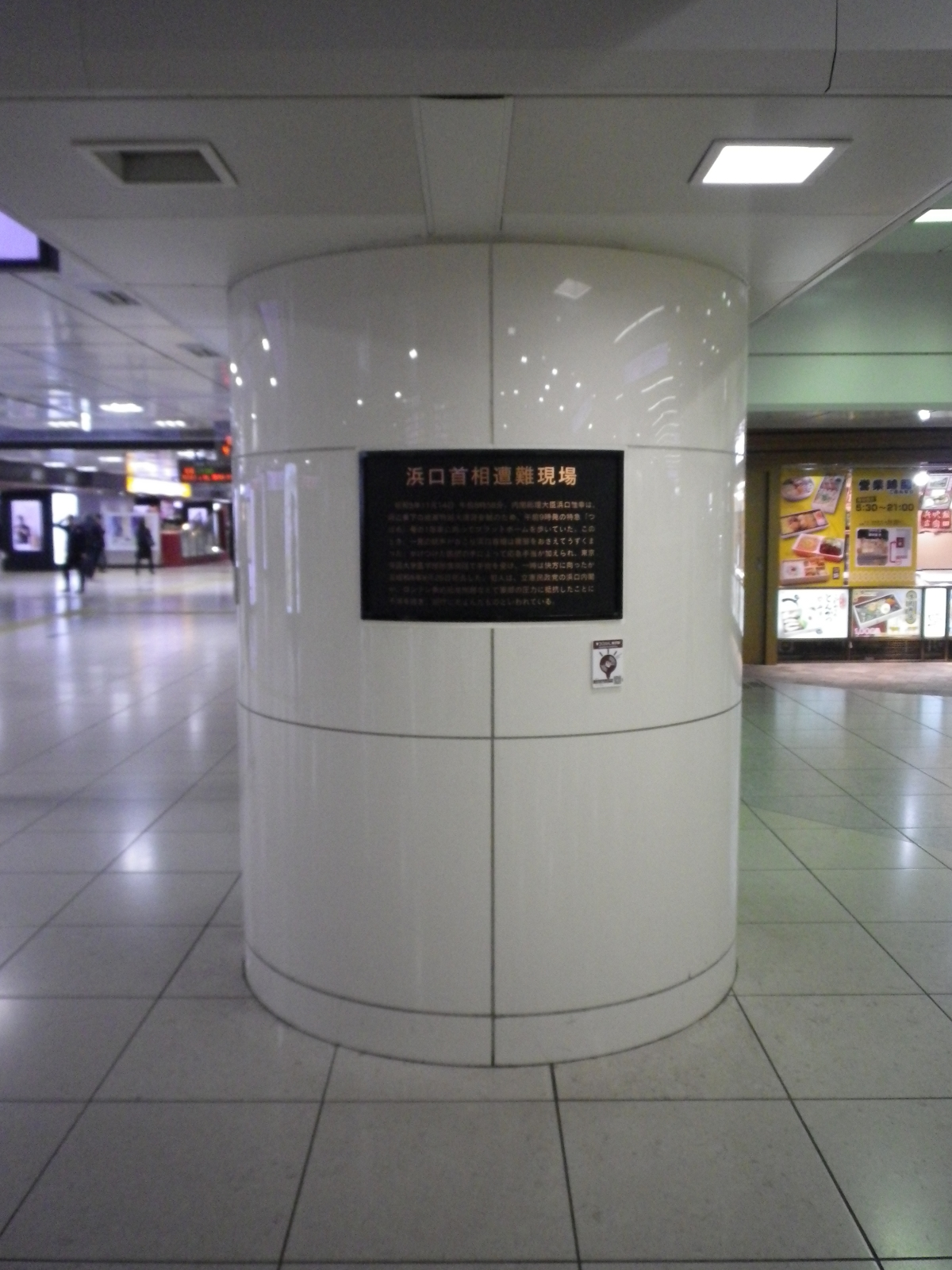
Plaque at Tokyo Station commemorating the shooting of Osachi Hamaguchi

Hamaguchi's initial popularity quickly waned, and he fell victim to an assassination attempt on 14 November 1930 when he was shot inside Tokyo Station by Tomeo Sagôya, a member of the Aikokusha ultranationalist secret society. (Nine years earlier another Prime Minister, Hara Takashi, had been assassinated near the same place.) The head of the Aikoku-sha was Seiyūkai politician Ogawa Heikichi. The wounds kept Hamaguchi hospitalized for several months.

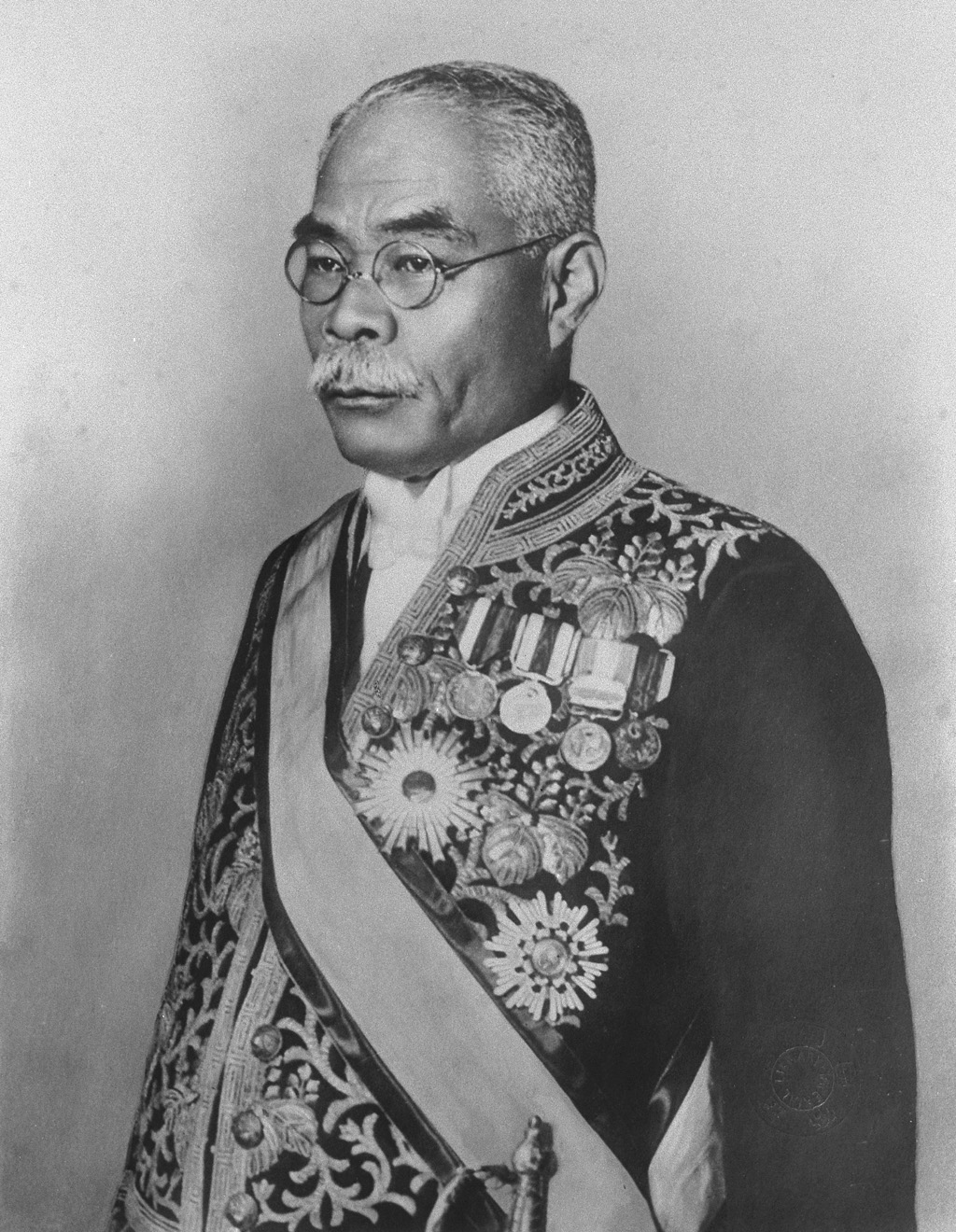
Hamaguchi in diplomatic dress

Hamaguchi attempted to resume office in March 1931. However, with his health continuing to deteriorate, he was unable to attend the 59th Session of the Imperial Diet, which opened with Foreign Minister Kijūrō Shidehara as acting Prime Minister. The Seiyūkai immediately attacked the government on the grounds that the Prime Minister was not physically present, and that Shidehara was not even a member of the Minseitō. When Shidehara further created an uproar with a comment concerning Emperor Hirohito's support of the London Naval Treaty, the Seiyūkai refused to participate in budget deliberations until Hamaguchi could attend. Despite his failing health, Hamaguchi was forced to attend the Diet, but resigned a month later to be replaced by Wakatsuki Reijirō. He died on 26 August of the same year, and his grave is at the Aoyama Cemetery in Tokyo.

Sagôya was not immediately tried for murder. Nevertheless, in 1932, he was sentenced to death for attempted murder, after the judge ruled that the bullet had caused Osachi's death. Yoshikatsu Matsuki was sentenced to 13 years in prison as an accomplice, while Ainosuke Iwata received a 4-month sentence. However, in 1934, Sagôya's death sentence was reduced to life in prison in a general amnesty. He was one of many people involved in politically motivated murders, including that of prime ministers, to have their sentences reduced. Sagôya was released from prison in 1940, and died in 1972. He continued to be involved in far-right activities until his death.

In 1931 Hamaguchi's cabinet sponsored a bill on women's suffrage. It would have granted women over the age of 25 the right to vote in local elections and stand for office given their husbands' approval. The bill passed the lower house, but it was defeated in the House of Peers in March 1931 by a vote of 184 to 62.

== Honours ==
- Grand Cordon of the Order of the Sacred Treasure (July 1926)
- Grand Cordon of the Order of the Rising Sun (April 1927)
- Grand Cordon of the Order of the Rising Sun with Paulownia Flowers (April 1931)

Political offices
Preceded by Kijūrō Shidehara (acting)	Prime Minister of Japan; 10 March 1931 – 14 April 1931	Succeeded by Wakatsuki Reijirō
Preceded by Tanaka Giichi	Prime Minister of Japan; 2 July 1929 – 14 November 1930	Succeeded by Kijūrō Shidehara (acting)
Preceded by Wakatsuki Reijirō	Home Minister; 3 June 1926 – 20 April 1927	Succeeded by Suzuki Kisaburō
Preceded by Kazue Shōda	Finance Minister; 30 January 1926 – 20 April 1927	Succeeded by Seiji Hamaya
