= Kenseikai =

Kenseikai 憲政会
- Leader: Katō Takaaki; Wakatsuki Reijirō
- Founded: October 10, 1916
- Dissolved: June 27, 1927
- Merger of: Rikken Dōshikai; Chūseikai; Kōyū Club
- Succeeded by: Rikken Minseitō
- Headquarters: Tokyo
- Ideology: Conservatism; Liberalism

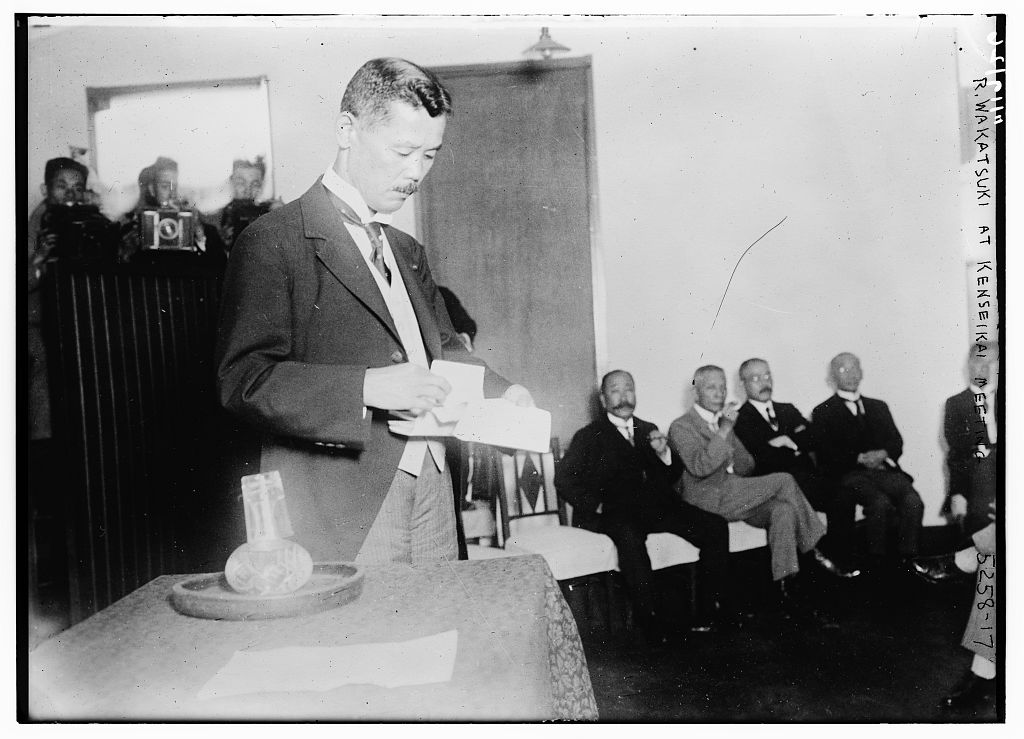
Wakatsuki Reijirō at a Kenseikai meeting

The Kenseikai (憲政会; "Constitutional Politics Association") was a short-lived political party in the pre-war Empire of Japan.

== History ==
The Kenseikai was founded on 10 October 1916, as a merger of the Rikken Dōshikai (led by Katō Takaaki), Chūseikai (led by Ozaki Yukio) and the Kōyū Club (a minor opposition group). Led by Katō Takaaki, the new party was united by its opposition to the policies of the ruling Rikken Seiyūkai under Prime Minister Ōkuma Shigenobu. The party was supported financially by the Mitsubishi zaibatsu, due to family ties with Katō Takaaki. Party leaders included Hamaguchi Osachi and Adachi Kenzō. The merger gave the Kenseikai a total of 198 seats in the Lower House of the Diet of Japan, thus forming a majority, and raised the expectation that Katō Takaaki would become the next prime minister.

However, the position of prime minister was a direct appointment from the Emperor per advice provided by the genrō, and in this case, the genrō unexpectedly nominated General Terauchi Masatake instead. In protest, the Kenseikai initiated a no confidence motion, which subsequently dissolved the Diet and led to the political isolation of the Kenseikai for almost a decade. During its period in the opposition, the Kenseikai strongly opposed the Siberian Intervention and pushed for greater rights for labor unions.

In the 1924 General Election, the Kenseikai secured 150 seats, making it the largest single party in the Lower House, but without a majority. Katō agreed to form a coalition government with the Rikken Seiyukai (led by Takahashi Korekiyo), which had 100 seats, and the Kakushin Club (led by Inukai Tsuyoshi), which had 30 seats. This three-party coalition (Goken Sampa Naikaku) was the first ruling coalition government in Japanese history, and used its majority to focus on domestic political reform and a moderate foreign policy.

It pushed strongly for rule under the Meiji Constitution, without influence or control by the genrō. It also favored universal male suffrage (which led to the General Election Law) and much needed reforms in labor laws and in the economic situation for farmers. However, despite its liberal image, the coalition passed the Peace Preservation Law in 1925.

Following Katō's death, the party was led by Wakatsuki Reijirō, but his cabinet was unable to weather the Shōwa financial crisis of 1927. The Kenseikai merged with the Seiyū Hontō in June 1927 to form the Rikken Minseitō.

== Election results ==
Election year	Votes		Seats	Change
Election year	Number	Percentage	Seats	Change
1917	467,518	36.0%	121 / 381	Steady
1920	715,500	27.5%	110 / 464	11
1924	872,533	29.3%	151 / 464	▲41
