= Hara cabinet =

Cabinet of Japan (1918–1921)

Hara Cabinet
- 19th Cabinet of Japan

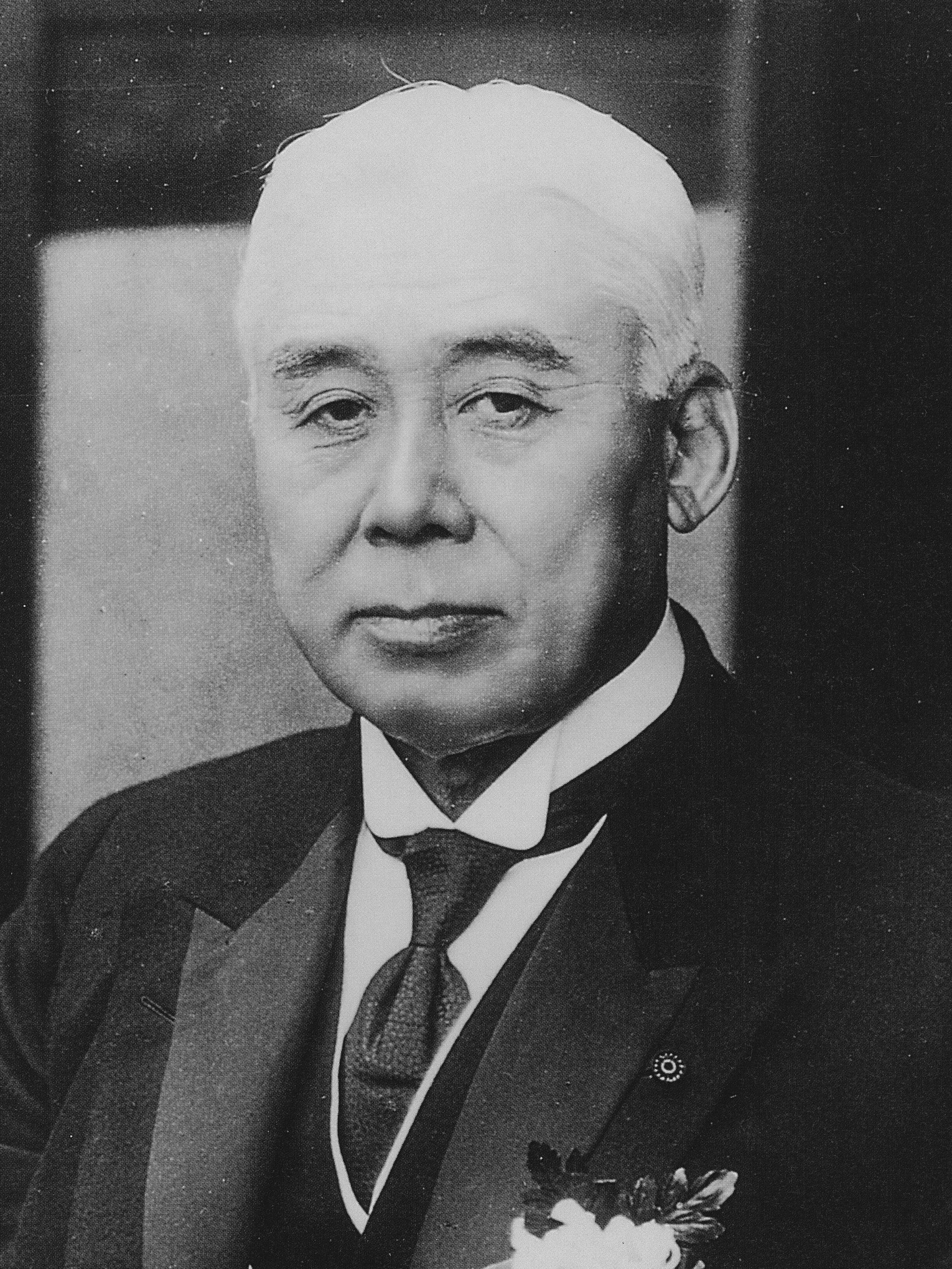
- Prime Minister Hara Takashi
- Date formed: September 29, 1918
- Date dissolved: November 13, 1921

People and organisations
- Emperor: Taishō
- Prime Minister: Hara Takashi; Uchida Kōsai (acting)
- Member party: HoR Blocs: Rikken Seiyūkai; HoP Blocs: Kōuyu Club; Kenkyūkai

History
- Election: 1920 general election
- Legislature terms: 41st Imperial Diet; 42nd Imperial Diet; 43rd Imperial Diet; 44th Imperial Diet
- Predecessor: Terauchi Cabinet
- Successor: Takahashi Cabinet

The Hara Cabinet is the 19th Cabinet of Japan led by Hara Takashi from September 29, 1918, to November 13, 1921.

== Cabinet ==
Portfolio	Minister	Political party	Term start	Term end
Prime Minister	Hara Takashi	Rikken Seiyūkai	September 29, 1918	November 4, 1921
Minister for Foreign Affairs	Count Uchida Kōsai	Independent	September 29, 1918	November 4, 1921
Minister of Home Affairs	Tokonami Takejirō	Rikken Seiyūkai	September 29, 1918	November 4, 1921
Minister of Finance	Viscount Takahashi Korekiyo	Rikken Seiyūkai	September 29, 1918	November 4, 1921
Minister of the Army	Tanaka Giichi	Military (Army)	September 29, 1918	June 9, 1921
Minister of the Army	Yamanashi Hanzō	Military (Army)	June 9, 1921	November 4, 1921
Minister of the Navy	Baron Katō Tomosaburō	Military (Navy)	September 29, 1918	November 4, 1921
Minister of Justice	Hara Takashi	Rikken Seiyūkai	September 29, 1918	May 15, 1920
Minister of Justice	Enkichi Ōki	Rikken Seiyūkai	May 15, 1920	November 4, 1921
Minister of Education	Nakahashi Tokugorō	Rikken Seiyūkai	September 29, 1918	November 4, 1921
Minister of Agriculture and Commerce	Baron Yamamoto Tatsuo	Rikken Seiyūkai	September 29, 1918	November 4, 1921
Minister of Communications	Noda Utarō	Rikken Seiyūkai	September 29, 1918	November 4, 1921
Minister of Railways	Motoda Hajime	Rikken Seiyūkai	May 15, 1920	November 4, 1921
Chief Cabinet Secretary	Takahashi Mitsutake	Rikken Seiyūkai	September 29, 1918	November 4, 1921
Director-General of the Cabinet Legislation Bureau	Yokota Sennosuke	Rikken Seiyūkai	September 29, 1918	November 4, 1921

Following Hara's assassination on November 4, 1921, Uchida Kōsai served as acting Prime Minister from November 4 to 13, 1921.

Portfolio	Minister	Political party	Term start	Term end
Prime Minister	Count Uchida Kōsai (acting)	Independent	November 4, 1921	November 13, 1921
Minister for Foreign Affairs	Count Uchida Kōsai	Independent	November 4, 1921	November 13, 1921
Minister of Home Affairs	Tokonami Takejirō	Rikken Seiyūkai	November 4, 1921	November 13, 1921
Minister of Finance	Viscount Takahashi Korekiyo	Rikken Seiyūkai	November 4, 1921	November 13, 1921
Minister of the Army	Yamanashi Hanzō	Military (Army)	November 4, 1921	November 13, 1921
Minister of the Navy	Baron Katō Tomosaburō	Military (Navy)	November 4, 1921	November 13, 1921
Minister of Justice	Enkichi Ōki	Rikken Seiyūkai	November 4, 1921	November 13, 1921
Minister of Education	Nakahashi Tokugorō	Rikken Seiyūkai	November 4, 1921	November 13, 1921
Minister of Agriculture and Commerce	Baron Yamamoto Tatsuo	Rikken Seiyūkai	November 4, 1921	November 13, 1921
Minister of Communications	Noda Utarō	Rikken Seiyūkai	November 4, 1921	November 13, 1921
Minister of Railways	Motoda Hajime	Rikken Seiyūkai	November 4, 1921	November 13, 1921
Chief Cabinet Secretary	Takahashi Mitsutake	Rikken Seiyūkai	November 4, 1921	November 13, 1921
Director-General of the Cabinet Legislation Bureau	Yokota Sennosuke	Rikken Seiyūkai	November 4, 1921	November 13, 1921
