= Takahashi cabinet =

Cabinet of Japan (1921–1922)

Takahashi Cabinet
- 20th Cabinet of Japan

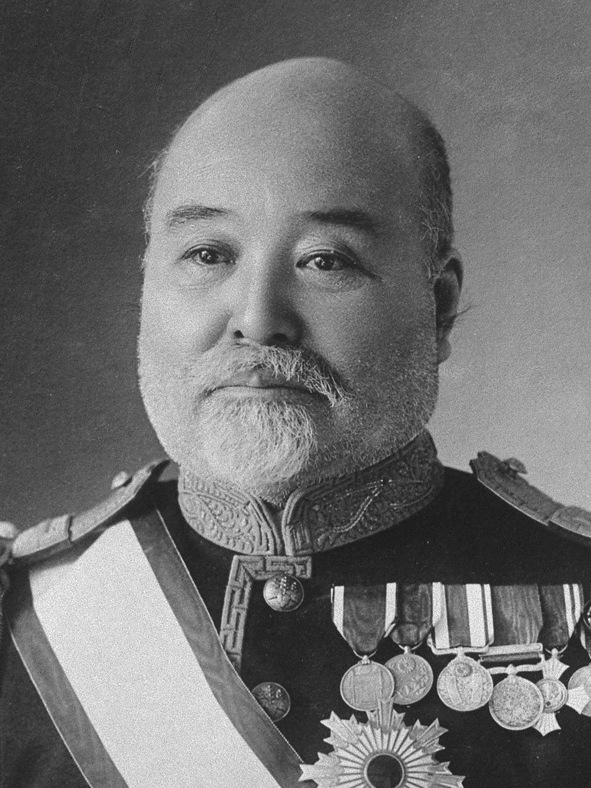
- Prime Minister Takahashi Korekiyo
- Date formed: November 4, 1921
- Date dissolved: June 12, 1922

People and organisations
- Emperor: Taishō
- Prime Minister: Takahashi Korekiyo
- Member party: HoR Blocs: Rikken Seiyūkai; HoP Blocs: Kōuyu Club; Kenkyūkai

History
- Legislature term: 45th Imperial Diet
- Predecessor: Hara Cabinet
- Successor: Katō Tomosaburō Cabinet

The Takahashi Cabinet is the 20th Cabinet of Japan led by Takahashi Korekiyo from November 4, 1921 to June 12, 1922.

== Cabinet ==
Portfolio	Minister	Political party	Term start	Term end
Prime Minister	Viscount Takahashi Korekiyo	Rikken Seiyūkai	November 4, 1921	June 12, 1922
Minister for Foreign Affairs	Count Uchida Kōsai	Independent	November 4, 1921	June 12, 1922
Minister of Home Affairs	Tokonami Takejirō	Rikken Seiyūkai	November 4, 1921	June 12, 1922
Minister of Finance	Viscount Takahashi Korekiyo	Rikken Seiyūkai	November 4, 1921	June 12, 1922
Minister of the Army	Yamanashi Hanzō	Military (Army)	November 4, 1921	June 12, 1922
Minister of the Navy	Baron Katō Tomosaburō	Military (Navy)	November 4, 1921	June 12, 1922
Minister of Justice	Enkichi Ōki	Rikken Seiyūkai	November 4, 1921	June 12, 1922
Minister of Education	Nakahashi Tokugorō	Rikken Seiyūkai	November 4, 1921	June 12, 1922
Minister of Agriculture and Commerce	Baron Yamamoto Tatsuo	Rikken Seiyūkai	November 4, 1921	June 12, 1922
Minister of Communications	Noda Utarō	Rikken Seiyūkai	November 4, 1921	June 12, 1922
Minister of Railways	Motoda Hajime	Rikken Seiyūkai	November 4, 1921	June 12, 1922
Chief Cabinet Secretary	Mitsuchi Chūzō	Rikken Seiyūkai	November 4, 1921	June 12, 1922
Director-General of the Cabinet Legislation Bureau	Yokota Sennosuke	Rikken Seiyūkai	November 4, 1921	March 28, 1922
Director-General of the Cabinet Legislation Bureau	Eiichi Baba	Independent	March 28, 1922	June 12, 1922
