= Katō Cabinet =

Katō Cabinet may refer to:

- Katō Tomosaburō Cabinet, the Japanese government led by Katō Tomosaburō from 1922 to 1923
- Katō Takaaki Cabinet, the Japanese government led by Katō Takaaki from 1924 to 1926
