= Noda Utarō =

Japanese politician

Senior Third Rank Noda Utarō
- 野田 卯太郎
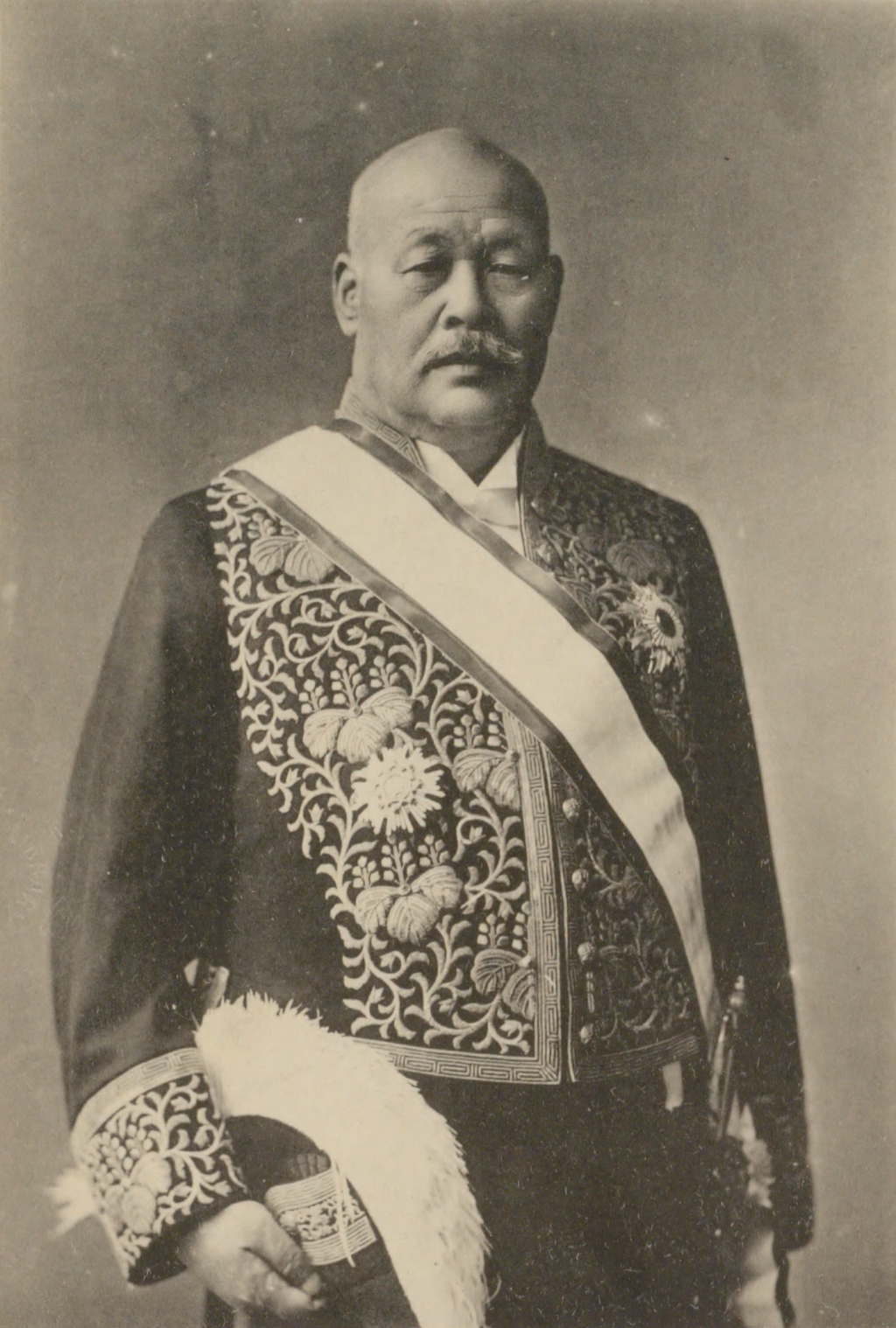

Minister of Commerce and Industry
- In office 17 April 1925 – 2 August 1925
- Prime Minister: Katō Takaaki
- Preceded by: Takahashi Korekiyo
- Succeeded by: Kataoka Naoharu

Minister of Communications
- In office 29 September 1918 – 12 June 1922
- Prime Minister: Hara Takashi; Takahashi Korekiyo
- Preceded by: Den Kenjirō
- Succeeded by: Maeda Toshisada

Member of the House of Representatives
- In office 20 April 1917 – 23 February 1927
- Preceded by: Multi-member district
- Succeeded by: Shinshi Kaitani
- Constituency: Fukuoka Counties (1917–1920); Fukuoka 12th (1920–1924); Fukuoka 7th (1924–1927)
- In office 15 March 1898 – 25 December 1914
- Preceded by: Nakamura Hikoji
- Succeeded by: Multi-member district
- Constituency: Fukuoka 5th (1898); Fukuoka 4th (1898–1902); Fukuoka Counties (1902–1914)

Personal details
- Born: 21 December 1853 Takata, Fukuoka, Japan
- Died: 23 February 1927 (aged 73) Setagaya, Tokyo, Japan
- Party: Rikken Seiyūkai (1900–1927)
- Other political affiliations: Liberal (1898); Kenseitō (1898–1900)
- Relatives: Raizo Matsuno (grandson); Yorihisa Matsuno (great-grandson)

Noda Utarō (野田 卯太郎; 21 December 1853 – 23 February 1927) was an entrepreneur, politician and cabinet minister in the pre-World War II Empire of Japan.

== Biography ==
Noda was from a wealthy farming family of Takata, Fukuoka (currently part of the city of Miyama, Fukuoka Prefecture). In his youth, he worked in the Miike Coal Mines, following which he obtained a position at the Miike Bank, both owned by the Mitsui zaibatsu. He became active in politics, supporting the Freedom and People's Rights Movement, serving in the Fukuoka Prefectural Assembly in 1886. He was elected to the Lower House of the Diet of Japan in the March 1898 General Election, and was subsequently re-elected a total of nine times. As an entrepreneur, he founded the Miike Civil Engineering Company, and was one of the founding members of the South Manchurian Railway in 1906. He was secretary-general of the Rikken Seiyūkai political party in 1912, and became vice president of the Oriental Development Company in 1913. While vice president of the Oriental Development Company, Noda advised the Diet that the number of Japanese agricultural emigrants to Korea would reach 500,000 by the year 1920, however, the actual numbers eventually turned out to be only a small fraction of this number.

Noda served as Minister of Communications from 1918 to 1922 under the Hara and Takahashi Cabinets. He subsequently served as Minister of Commerce and Industry under the Katō Tomosaburō Cabinet in 1925.

Noda was also a poet, noted for the nationalistic themes in his works, and was a close correspondent with Tōyama Mitsuru and Nakano Seigō, with whom he cooperated in the creation of the Kokushikan University in 1917.

Political offices
| Preceded by Takahashi Korekiyo | Minister of Commerce and Industry; Apr 1925 – Aug 1925 | Succeeded by Kataoka Naoharu |
| Preceded by Den Kenjirō | Minister of Communications; Sept 1918 – June 1922 | Succeeded by Maeda Toshisada |
