= Katō Tomosaburō cabinet =

Cabinet of Japan (1922–1923)

Katō Tomosaburō Cabinet
- 21st Cabinet of Japan

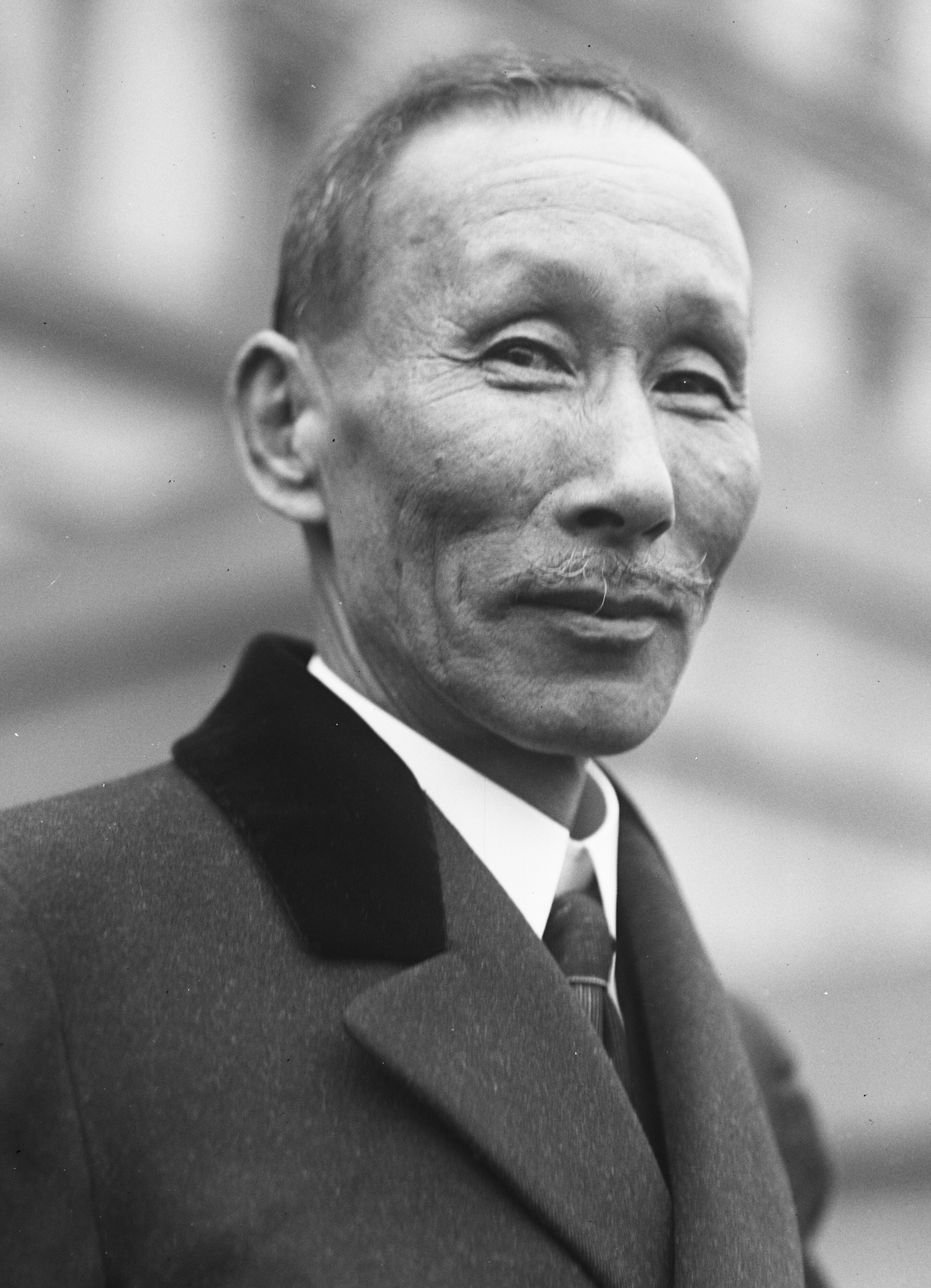
- Prime Minister Katō Tomosaburō
- Date formed: June 12, 1922
- Date dissolved: September 2, 1923

People and organisations
- Emperor: Taishō
- Prime Minister: Katō Tomosaburō; Uchida Kōsai (acting)
- Member party: HoR Blocs: Rikken Seiyūkai; Kōshin Club; HoP Blocs: Kōuyu Club; Kenkyūkai

History
- Legislature term: 46th Imperial Diet
- Predecessor: Takahashi Cabinet
- Successor: Second Yamamoto Cabinet

The Katō Tomosaburō Cabinet is the 21st Cabinet of Japan led by Katō Tomosaburō from June 12, 1922 to September 2, 1923.

== Cabinet ==
Portfolio	Minister	Political party	Term start	Term end
Prime Minister	Baron Katō Tomosaburō	Military (Navy)	June 12, 1922	August 24, 1923
Minister for Foreign Affairs	Count Uchida Kōsai	Independent	June 12, 1922	August 24, 1923
Minister of Home Affairs	Mizuno Rentarō	Rikken Seiyūkai	June 12, 1922	August 24, 1923
Minister of Finance	Otohiko Ichiki	Independent	June 12, 1922	August 24, 1923
Minister of the Army	Yamanashi Hanzō	Military (Army)	June 12, 1922	August 24, 1923
Minister of the Navy	Baron Katō Tomosaburō	Military (Navy)	November 4, 1921	May 15, 1923
Minister of the Navy	Takarabe Takeshi	Military (Navy)	May 15, 1923	August 24, 1923
Minister of Justice	Okano Keijirō	Rikken Seiyūkai	June 12, 1922	August 24, 1923
Minister of Education	Kamata Eikichi	Rikken Seiyūkai	June 12, 1922	August 24, 1923
Minister of Agriculture and Commerce	Arai Kentarō	Rikken Seiyūkai	June 12, 1922	August 24, 1923
Minister of Communications	Viscount Maeda Toshisada	Independent	June 12, 1922	August 24, 1923
Minister of Railways	Count Enkichi Ōki	Independent	June 12, 1922	August 24, 1923
Chief Cabinet Secretary	Miyata Mitsuo	Independent	June 12, 1922	August 24, 1923
Director-General of the Cabinet Legislation Bureau	Eiichi Baba	Independent	June 12, 1922	August 24, 1923

Following Katō's death on August 24, 1923, Uchida Kōsai served as acting Prime Minister from August 24 to September 2, 1923.

Portfolio	Minister	Political party	Term start	Term end
Prime Minister	Count Uchida Kōsai (acting)	Independent	August 24, 1923	September 2, 1923
Minister for Foreign Affairs	Count Uchida Kōsai	Independent	August 24, 1923	September 2, 1923
Minister of Home Affairs	Mizuno Rentarō	Rikken Seiyūkai	August 24, 1923	September 2, 1923
Minister of Finance	Otohiko Ichiki	Independent	August 24, 1923	September 2, 1923
Minister of the Army	Yamanashi Hanzō	Military (Army)	August 24, 1923	September 2, 1923
Minister of the Navy	Takarabe Takeshi	Military (Navy)	August 24, 1923	September 2, 1923
Minister of Justice	Okano Keijirō	Rikken Seiyūkai	August 24, 1923	September 2, 1923
Minister of Education	Kamata Eikichi	Rikken Seiyūkai	August 24, 1923	September 2, 1923
Minister of Agriculture and Commerce	Arai Kentarō	Rikken Seiyūkai	August 24, 1923	September 2, 1923
Minister of Communications	Viscount Maeda Toshisada	Independent	August 24, 1923	September 2, 1923
Minister of Railways	Count Enkichi Ōki	Independent	August 24, 1923	September 2, 1923
Chief Cabinet Secretary	Miyata Mitsuo	Independent	August 24, 1923	September 2, 1923
Director-General of the Cabinet Legislation Bureau	Eiichi Baba	Independent	August 24, 1923	September 2, 1923
