= Kang Ugyu =

Korean doctor and activist (1855–1920)

- 강우규
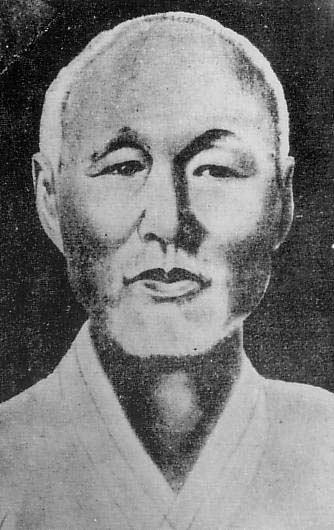
- Born: April 20, 1855; Tokchon, Pyongan Province, Joseon
- Died: November 29, 1920 (aged 65); Seodaemun Prison, Keijō, Korea, Empire of Japan
- Cause of death: Execution by hanging
- Resting place: First buried at a cemetery in Sinsa-dong, Eunpyeong District; Moved to Suyu-ri in 1954; Moved to the Seoul National Cemetery in 1967

Korean name
- Hangul: 강우규
- Hanja: 姜宇奎
- RR: Gang Ugyu
- MR: Kang Ugyu

Kang Ugyu (Korean: 강우규; Hanja: 姜宇奎, April 20, 1855 – November 29, 1920) was a doctor of Korean medicine and a fighter for Korean independence during the Japanese colonial period. In 1919, Kang tried to assassinate Saitō Makoto, who was serving as the Governor-General of Korea, but failed.

== Life and career ==
=== Early life and educational activities ===
Kang was born in Tokchon, Pyongan Province, Joseon. He spent his childhood in Jinju and Miryang, both in Gyeongsang Province.

Kang studied Korean medicine from a young age after returning home to Tokchon in Pyongan Province. In 1884, he moved to Hongwon, Hamgyong Province, where he served as a Korean medicine doctor while teaching children Neo-Confucianism. He reportedly fled there as his personal security was jeopardized because he was involved in Korean patriotic movements. Kang reportedly went to Hongwon with a large sum of money, and engaged in commerce there. He ran a general merchandise store with his son Jung Geon on Nammun Street in the center of Hongwon. The store mainly sold paint, cigarettes, and cotton thread. At the same time, he lent traders money at low interest.

=== Exile ===
Following the Japan–Korea Treaty of 1905, and the annexation of Korea and its colonial rule by Japan following the Japan–Korea Treaty of 1910, Kang was deeply angered. At the time, he was a middle-aged man over 50. In the fall of 1910, Kang decided to seek asylum and moved members of his family to Khabarovsk. He himself left Hongwon and went into exile in Dudogu, northern Gando (Jiandao), Manchuria, in the spring of 1911, where he ran a herbal medicine shop.

In 1915, he moved to Yo-dong in Liaohe County, Jilin, and traveled to and from Vladivostok to work for independence. He reclaimed farmland around Yoha to build Shinheungchon, a Korean village. The village later became the main base for independence forces operating in Siberia and North Manchuria.

In 1917, Kang founded Gwandong Middle School in Tonghua County, Jilin Province, Northeast China. He worked hard to promote the spirit of independence by educating his fellow countrymen. As a Christian Presbyterian, he worked in the school of the church, using his position to promote anti-Japanese sentiment among students and Koreans living nearby. Kang condemned Japanese war crimes when teaching the students. He occasionally gathered villagers in the school auditorium to promote national consciousness.

In the March First Movement in 1919, Kang gathered students and their compatriots at Gwandong School. He organized the independence movement with a focus on Yeohyeon. Kang did not believe that a simple independence movement would lead to the independence of his country, so he went to Vladivostok, where Lee Dong-hwi was active. He served as chief of Yo Ha-yeon's branch in the Senior Citizen's Association with Lee Seung-kyo, Lee Dong-hwi's father.

=== Infiltration into Korea, attempted assassination ===
In 1919, Kang handed over Gwandong Middle School and Shinheungchon village to a Korean American before sneaking back into Japanese-occupied Korea. He bought a grenade from a Russian and infiltrated into Keijō (as Seoul was then called), via Wonsan, with Huh Hyung. He hid the grenade from Japanese police by wearing it between his legs in a diaper.

On September 2, 1919, due to internal and external strife, Japanese admiral Saitō Makoto had been appointed to replace Hasegawa Yoshimichi as the governor-general. On the day Saitō arrived Korea, Kang attempted to assassinate Saitō by throwing a bomb at him. The explosion missed Saito but injured several onlookers. The El Paso Herald reported that twenty were injured including an American, a relative of former Chicago Mayor Carter Harrison Sr., who coincidentally had been assassinated in 1893. After the failed assassination attempt, Kang went into hiding. According to Oh Tae-young, Kang hid in Jang Ik-kyu and Lim Seung-hwa's house. He was later caught by Kim Tae-seok and jailed on September 17. Five others were also arrested in connection to the bomb attack.

=== Death ===
Kang was sentenced to death for attempted murder and a charge of civilian casualties. Even after his death sentence was confirmed, Kang read the Bible every day, prayed in the morning and evening, and waited for his last day with a relaxed mind. While in prison, Kang told his sons: "Don't do anything about my death. I feel rather ashamed that I have done nothing for my country all my life. It is the education of our young people that I cannot forget even when I'm sleeping. If my death give a little impetus to the minds of the young people, that's what I wish for." Informally, he told them to spread his will to schools and churches across the country.

Kang was hanged on November 29, 1920. He never renounced his beliefs and was defiant until his death. After the attack the Japanese increased the Korean police presence in the region from 12,000 to 20,000 members.

== After death ==
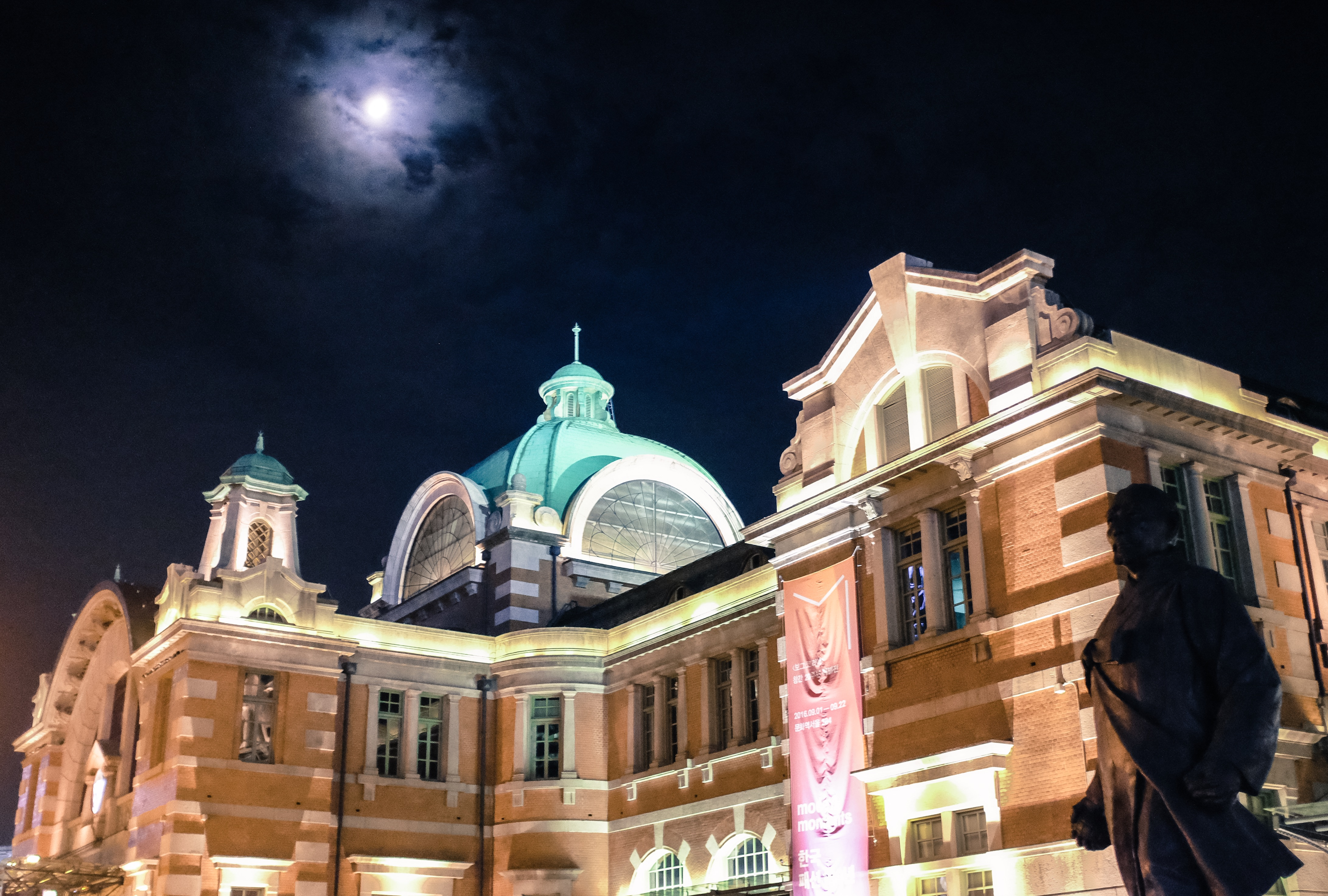
A statue of Kang is in front of the Seoul Station, where he threw a bomb at Saitō Makoto.

Kang's remains were first buried at a cemetery in Sinsa-dong, Eunpyeong District. They were later moved to Suyu-ri, Jindo in 1954 and to the Seoul National Cemetery in 1967. In March 1962, Kang was posthumously awarded the Order of Merit for National Foundation.

A Chinese poem written in Kang's will just before his execution at Seodaemun Prison was preserved in the Independence Hall of Korea.

斷頭臺上 猶在春風
有身無國 豈無感想

Translation:

I am on the guillotine, as if I were amidst the spring breeze.
I have a body but no country; how can I not have feelings?

== Legacy ==
"I don't feel bad about it, If you change your stance, Kang Ugyu was predominant." said Chiba, the police chief in Gyeonggi Province.

Kang Ugyu was the first violent resister against Japanese occupation after the March First Movement. It was a great warning to Saitō and also contributed greatly to promoting awareness among Koreans at home and abroad. By holding steadfast in the face of injustice, life in prison, and execution, Kang inspired Koreans who were still involved in the independence movement. There is a statue of Kang at Seoul Station Plaza.
