= Tokyo Watanabe Bank =

Tokyo Watanabe Bank (東京渡辺銀行, Tōkyō Watanabe Ginkō), originally named the Twenty-Seventh National Bank (第二十七国立銀行, Dai-Nijūshichi Kokuritsu Ginkō), was a commercial bank based in Tokyo, Japan.

It was founded in 1877 and managed by Watanabe Jiemon IX, who ranked as the fifth wealthiest landlord in Tokyo City during the first decade of the 20th century. Upon his death in 1909, his son Genjiro took over presidency and renamed himself Watanabe Jiemon X.

== Bankruptcy ==
During World War I, the Watanabe family made investment in unsound ventures by making the bank put out more than 26 million yen to them. After the war and the Great Kantō earthquake, they began to have trouble repaying the debts, most of which were unsecured. The president borrowed cash from usurers and diverted the working capital of its subsidiaries through fraud and misappropriation to avoid bankruptcy.

The bank became nearly insolvent as its shoestring operation came to light in business magazines in February 1927. Its senior managing director was sent to the Ministry of Finance to ask for a government-financed bailout on 14 March 1927. However, due to some miscommunication, Finance Minister Kataoka Naoharu stated in the Imperial Diet that the bank had just gone bankrupt. His false statement led to a bank run and the bank's real bankruptcy, triggering the Shōwa financial crisis.
