= Kataoka Naoharu =

Japanese politician

Senior Fourth Rank Kataoka Naoharu
- 片岡 直温
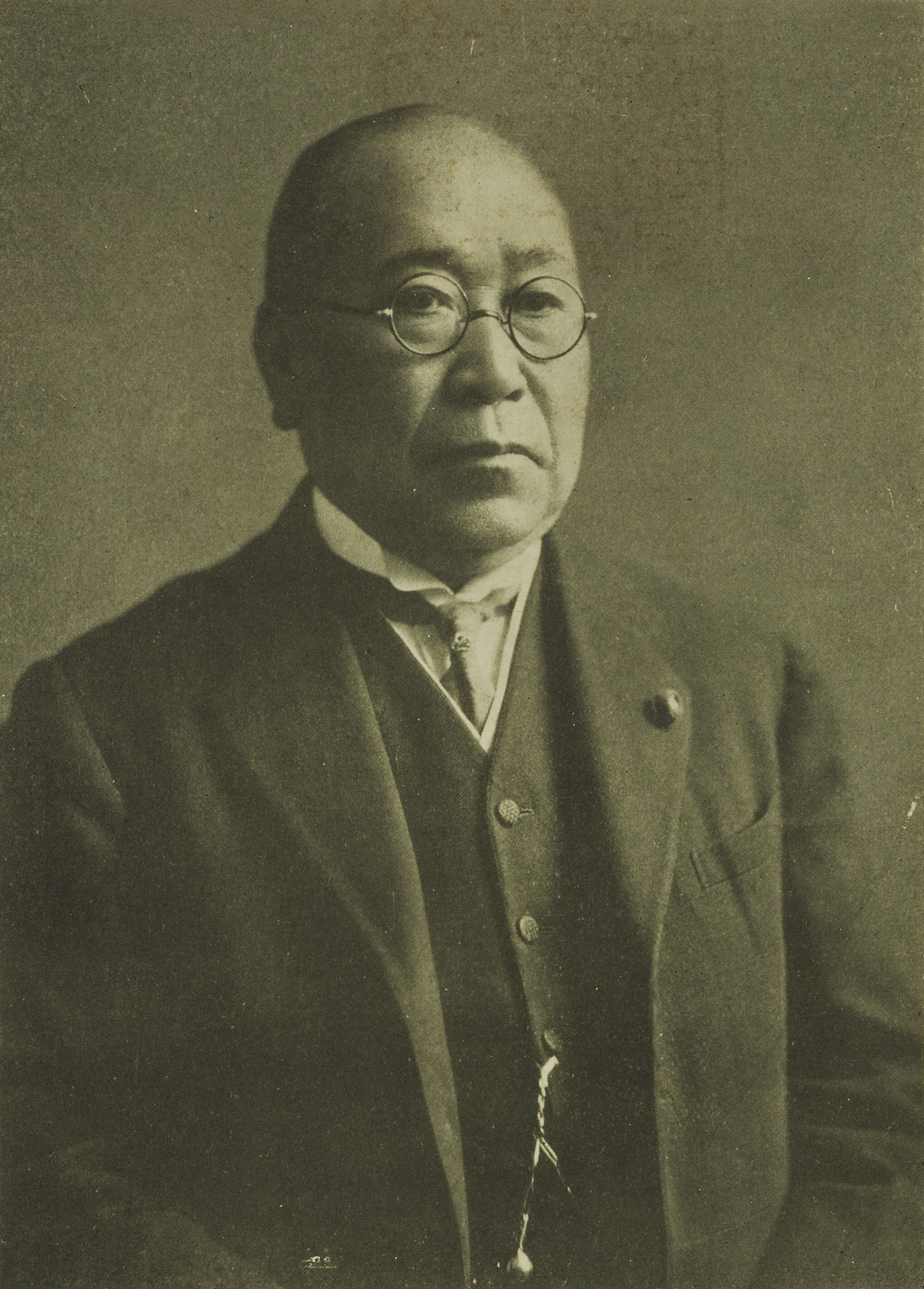

Minister of Finance
- In office 19 September 1926 – 20 April 1927
- Prime Minister: Wakatsuki Reijirō
- Preceded by: Hayami Seiji
- Succeeded by: Takahashi Korekiyo

Minister of Commerce and Industry
- In office 2 August 1925 – 14 September 1926
- Prime Minister: Katō Takaaki; Wakatsuki Reijirō
- Preceded by: Noda Utarō
- Succeeded by: Fujisawa Ikunosuke

Member of the House of Peers
- In office 11 April 1930 – 21 May 1934 Nominated by the Emperor

Member of the House of Representatives
- In office 10 May 1924 – 21 January 1930
- Preceded by: Yasutarō Okumura
- Succeeded by: Konosuke Yasuda
- Constituency: Kyoto 2nd (1924–1928); Kyoto 1st (1928–1930)
- In office 15 May 1908 – 26 February 1920
- Preceded by: Hayami Kumatarō
- Succeeded by: Constituency abolished
- Constituency: Mie Counties (1908–1912); Kōchi Counties (1912–1915); Kyoto Counties (1915–1920)
- In office 15 March 1898 – 10 June 1898
- Preceded by: Bunzaburō Toyota
- Succeeded by: Tokuzō Itō
- Constituency: Osaka 2nd
- In office 15 February 1892 – 9 June 1893
- Preceded by: Hayashi Yūzō
- Succeeded by: Hayashi Yūzō
- Constituency: Kōchi 2nd

Personal details
- Born: 13 October 1859 Tosa Province, Japan
- Died: 21 May 1934 (aged 74) Kyoto, Japan
- Party: Rikken Minseitō
- Other political affiliations: Jiyūtō (1892–1898); Yamashita Club (1898); Independent (1908–1910); Rikken Kokumintō (1910–1913); Rikken Dōshikai (1913–1916); Kenseikai (1916–1927)

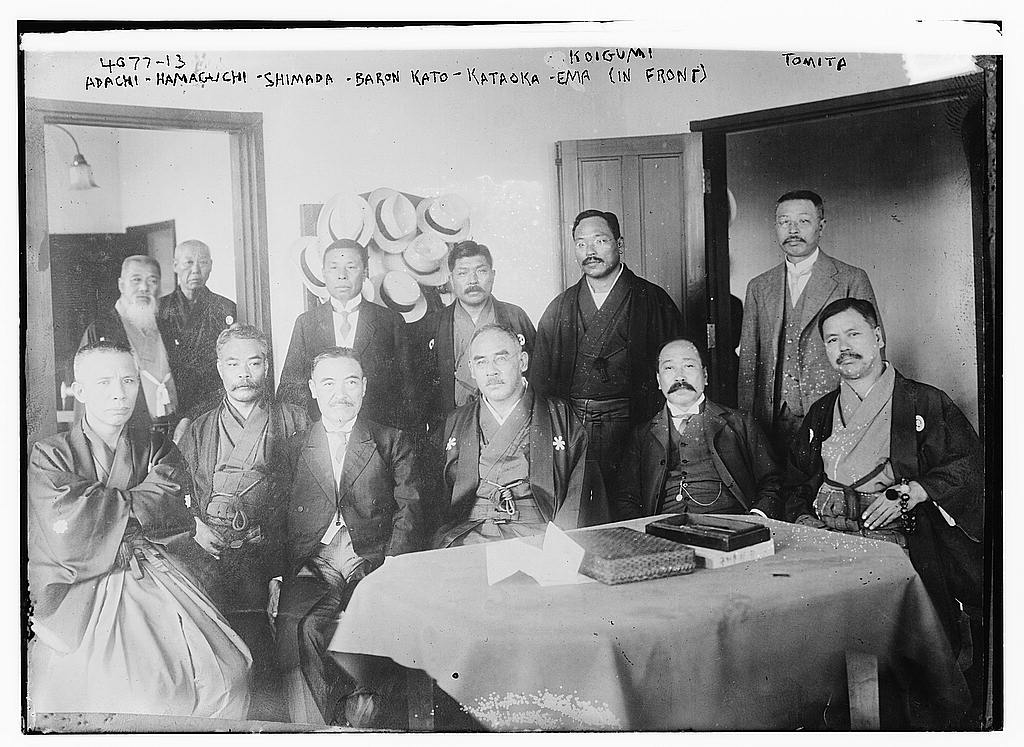
Adachi Kenzō, Osachi Hamaguchi, Toshio Shimada, Baron Kato, Kataoka Naoharu, and Ema Koigumi in 1916

Kataoka Naoharu (片岡 直温; 13 October 1859 – 21 May 1934) was a Japanese entrepreneur and politician during the prewar period. He served as Minister of Commerce and Industry (1924), Minister of Finance (1927), and a member of the House of Peers (1930–1934).

== Biography ==
Kataoka was born on 13 October 1859, in Tosa Province (present-day Kōchi Prefecture). He served as an official in the police department of Shiga Prefecture. In 1880, he was transferred to Tokyo, where he caught the attention of Itō Hirobumi and was recruited into the Home Ministry. However, in 1889, Kataoka was recruited away from a career to accept the post of vice president of Nippon Life Insurance Company, and subsequently served as president of the company from 1903 to 1919. He was also president of the Miyako Hotels chain from 1915, and served as a member of the board for the Kyōdō Bank and Kansai Railways.

Kataoka returned to political life as a member of the Lower House of the Diet of Japan in the 1892 General Election, and was subsequently re-elected eight times. A political ally of Katsura Tarō, he joined Katsura’s Rikken Dōshikai political party in 1913 and subsequently served as a senior official in the Kenseikai. As a politician, he was sympathetic to labor relations issues, advocating a government-run worker’s insurance plan and an easing of police restrictions on labor protests.

Kataoka joined the cabinet during the 2nd administration of Prime Minister Katō Takaaki as Minister of Commerce and Industry in 1924. He later served as Minister of Finance under the 1st cabinet of Wakatsuki Reijirō in 1927. However, his public proclamation during budgetary deliberations on 14 March 1927, that the Tokyo Watanabe Bank had gone bankrupt, when in fact it had not, resulted a bank run and was one of the main factors behind the Shōwa financial crisis and the collapse of the Wakatsuki administration.

Kataoka was awarded with a seat in the House of Peers from 1930. He died on 21 May 1934.

Political offices
Preceded by Noda Utarō	Minister of Commerce and Industry; Aug 1925 – Sept 1926	Succeeded by Fujisawa Ikunosuke
Preceded by Hayami Seiji	Minister of Finance; Sept 1925 – Apr 1927	Succeeded by Takahashi Korekiyo
