= Saitō Makoto =

Japanese admiral, prime minister from 1932 to 1934

Junior First Rank Viscount Saitō Makoto GCB GCSOC
- 斎藤 実
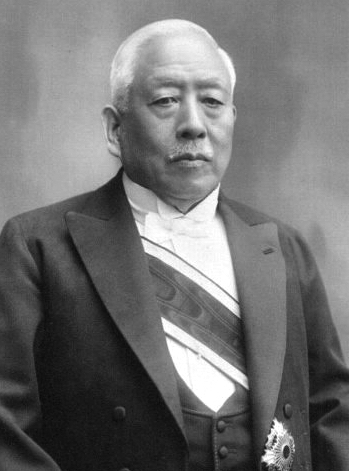

Prime Minister of Japan
- In office 26 May 1932 – 8 July 1934
- Monarch: Hirohito
- Preceded by: Inukai Tsuyoshi; Takahashi Korekiyo (acting)
- Succeeded by: Keisuke Okada

Lord Keeper of the Privy Seal
- In office 26 February 1935 – 26 February 1936
- Monarch: Hirohito
- Preceded by: Makino Nobuaki
- Succeeded by: Ichiki Kitokurō

Governor-General of Korea
- In office 17 August 1929 – 17 June 1931
- Monarch: Hirohito
- Preceded by: Yamanashi Hanzō
- Succeeded by: Kazushige Ugaki
- In office 12 August 1919 – 14 April 1927
- Monarchs: Taishō; Hirohito
- Preceded by: Hasegawa Yoshimichi
- Succeeded by: Kazushige Ugaki (acting)
Ministerial offices
Acting Minister of Education
In office 3 March 1934 – 8 July 1934
Prime Minister	Himself
Preceded by	Ichirō Hatoyama
Succeeded by	Genji Matsuda
Minister for Foreign Affairs
In office 26 May 1932 – 6 July 1932
Prime Minister	Himself
Preceded by	Kenkichi Yoshizawa
Succeeded by	Uchida Kōsai
Minister of the Navy
In office 7 January 1906 – 16 April 1914
Prime Minister	Saionji Kinmochi; Katsura Tarō; Yamamoto Gonnohyōe
Preceded by	Yamamoto Gonnohyōe
Succeeded by	Yashiro Rokurō

Member of the Privy Council
- In office 17 December 1927 – 17 August 1929
- Monarch: Hirohito

Personal details
- Born: 27 October 1858 Mizusawa, Mutsu, Japan
- Died: 26 February 1936 (aged 77) Yotsuya, Tokyo, Japan
- Party: Independent
- Spouse: Saitō Haruko (m. 1892)
- Relatives: Nire Kagenori (father-in-law)
- Education: Imperial Japanese Naval Academy
- Awards: Order of the Chrysanthemum; Order of the Bath (Honorary Knight Grand Cross)
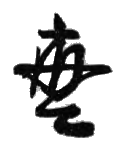
- Signature

Military service
- Allegiance: Japan
- Branch/service: Imperial Japanese Navy
- Years of service: 1879–1928
- Rank: Admiral
- Commands: Akitsushima; Itsukushima
- Battles/wars: First Sino-Japanese War; Russo-Japanese War; World War I

Viscount Saitō Makoto (斎藤 実; 27 October 1858 – 26 February 1936) was a Japanese admiral and politician who was prime minister of Japan from 1932 to 1934. Upon distinguishing himself during his command of two cruisers in the First Sino-Japanese War, Saitō rose rapidly to the rank of rear admiral by 1900. He was promoted to vice admiral during the Russo-Japanese War in 1904. After serving as Minister of the Navy from 1906 to 1914, Saitō held the position of Governor-General of Korea from 1919 to 1927 and again from 1929 to 1931. When Inukai Tsuyoshi was assassinated in May 1932, he took his place as prime minister and served one term in office. Saitō returned to public service as Lord Keeper of the Privy Seal in February 1935 but was assassinated only a year later during the February 26 Incident. Saitō along with Takahashi Korekiyo were the last former prime ministers of Japan to be assassinated until 2022, with the assassination of Shinzo Abe.

== Early life ==
Saitō was born in Mizusawa Domain, Mutsu Province (part of present-day Ōshū City Iwate Prefecture), as the son of a samurai of the Mizusawa Clan. In 1879, he graduated from the 6th class Imperial Japanese Naval Academy, ranking third out of a class of 17 cadets. He was commissioned an ensign on September 8, 1882, and promoted to sub-lieutenant on February 25, 1884.

== Military career ==
In 1884, Saitō went to the United States for four years to study as a military attaché. Promoted to lieutenant on 14 July 1886; in 1888, after returning to Japan, he served as a member of the Imperial Japanese Navy General Staff.

After his promotion to lieutenant commander on 20 December 1893, he served as executive officer on the cruiser Izumi and battleship Fuji.

During the First Sino-Japanese War, Saitō served as captain of the cruisers Akitsushima and Itsukushima. He received rapid promotions to commander on 1 December 1897 and to captain on 27 December. On 10 November 1898, he became Vice Minister of the Navy, and was promoted to rear admiral on 20 May 1900.

== Political career ==
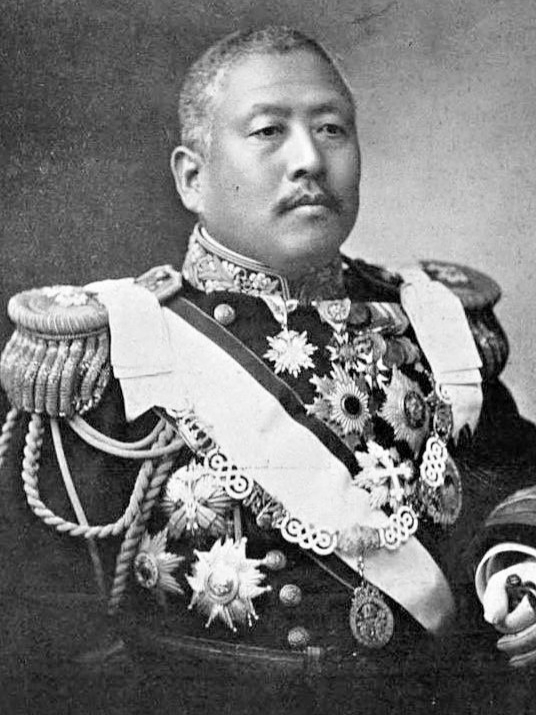
Saitō in 1910

Saitō was again Vice Navy Minister at the start of the Russo-Japanese War. He was promoted to vice admiral on June 6, 1904. He was awarded the Order of the Rising Sun (1st class) in 1906. After the end of the war, he served as Navy Minister for 8 years, from 1906 to 1914, during which time he continually strove for expansion of the navy.

On 21 September 1907, Saitō was ennobled with the title of danshaku (baron) under the kazoku peerage system. On October 16, 1912, he was promoted to full admiral. However, on 16 April 1914, Saitō was forced to resign from his post as Navy Minister due implications of his involvement in the Siemens scandal, and officially entered the reserves.

In September 1919, Saitō was appointed as the third Japanese Governor-General of Korea. Rising to the post right after the culmination of the Korean independence movement, he was subject to an immediate assassination attempt by Kang Woo-kyu, a radical Korean nationalist. He served as governor-general of Korea twice—in 1919–1927, and again in 1929–1931, implementing a series of measures to moderate Japan's policies on Koreans. He was awarded the Order of the Paulownia Flowers in 1924. On 29 April 1925, his title was elevated to that of shishaku (viscount).

In 1927, Saitō was a member of the Japanese delegation at the Geneva Naval Conference on Disarmament, and he later became a privy councillor.

== Premiership (1932–1934) ==
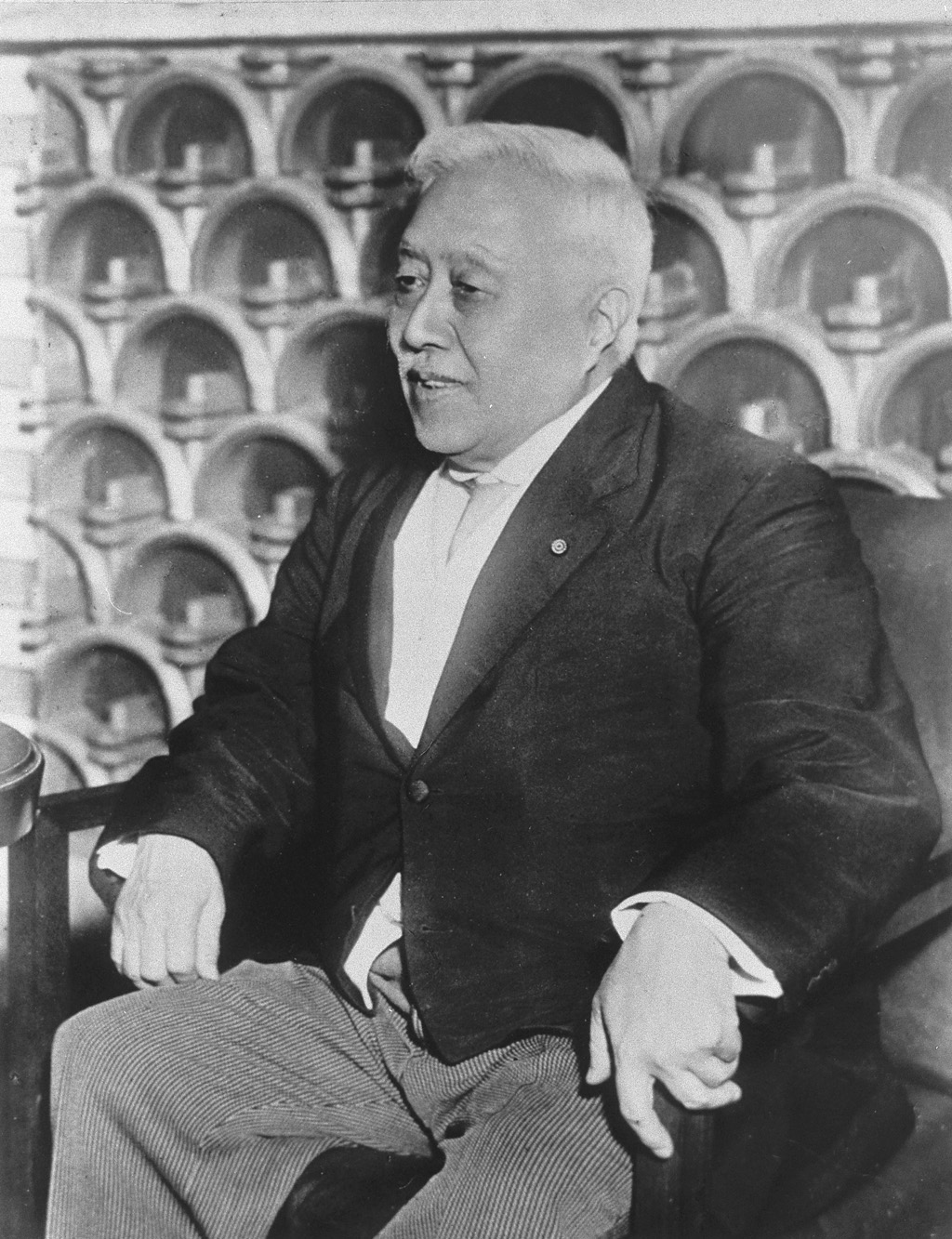
- Saitō, before 1936
- Premiership of Saitō Makoto; 26 May 1932 – 8 July 1934
- Monarch: Emperor Shōwa
- Cabinet: Saitō Cabinet
- Party: Military (Navy)
- Seat: Naikaku Sōri Daijin Kantei
- Emblem of the Government of Japan

Following the assassination of Prime Minister Inukai Tsuyoshi on 15 May 1932 by fanatical navy officers who thought Inukai far too conciliatory (the May 15 Incident), Prince Saionji Kinmochi, one of the Emperor's closest and strongest advisors, attempted to stop the slide towards a military take-over of the government. In a compromise move, Saitō was chosen to be Inukai's successor. Sadao Araki remained as War Minister and immediately began making demands on the new government. During Saitō's tenure, Japan recognized the independence of Manchukuo, and withdrew from the League of Nations.

Saitō's administration was one of the longer-serving ones of the inter-war period, and it continued until 8 July 1934, when the cabinet resigned en masse because of the Teijin Incident bribery scandal. Keisuke Okada succeeded as prime minister.

== Later career and assassination ==
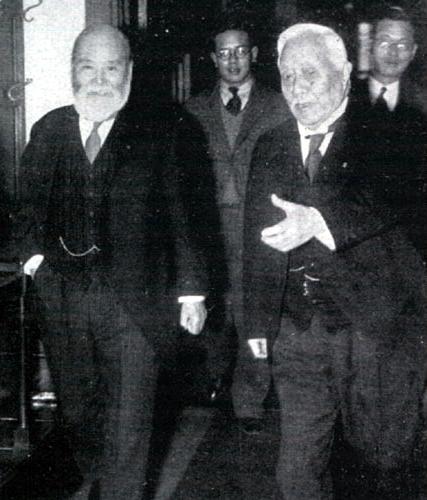
Saitō Makoto visits his close friend, Finance Minister Takahashi Korekiyo at his official residence on 20 February 1936. Less than a week after this photograph was taken, both were assassinated by ultranationalistic Army officers during the February 26 Incident.

Saitō continued to be an important figure in politics as Lord Keeper of the Privy Seal from 26 December 1935, but was assassinated during the February 26 Incident of 1936 at his home in Yotsuya, Tokyo. Takahashi, his predecessor, was shot dead the same day, along with several other top-rank politicians targeted by the rebels.

Saitō was posthumously awarded the Supreme Order of the Chrysanthemum.

== Honours ==
From the corresponding article in the Japanese Wikipedia

=== Peerages ===
- Baron (21 September 1907)
- Viscount (9 April 1925)

=== Decorations ===
- Order of the Sacred Treasure, Fourth Class (20 June 1899; Fifth Class: 25 November 1896; Sixth Class: 26 May 1893)
- Order of the Golden Kite, Second Class (1 April 1906; Fourth Class: 23 May 1896)
- Grand Cordon of the Order of the Rising Sun (1 April 1906; Second Class: 27 December 1901; Sixth Class: 23 May 1896)
- Grand Cordon of the Order of the Rising Sun with Paulownia Flowers (11 February 1924)
- Grand Cordon of the Order of the Chrysanthemum (26 February 1936; posthumous)

=== Foreign decorations ===
- United Kingdom: Honorary Knight Grand Cross of the Order of the Bath (GCB) (15 May 1906)
- Kingdom of Prussia: Order of the Red Eagle, Knight 1st Class (26 February 1907)
- Kingdom of Italy: Knight Grand Class of the Order of Saints Maurice and Lazarus (1 July 1907)
- France: Grand Officer of the Legion d'Honneur (17 December 1907; Commander: 4 April 1901)
- Russian Empire: Order of the White Eagle (1 May 1908)
- Netherlands: Knight Grand Cross of the Order of Orange-Nassau (31 May 1911)
- Chile: Order of Merit, 1st Class (22 March 1913)
- Holy See:
  - Knight Grand Cross of the Order of St. Sylvester (17 January 1922)
  - Knight Grand Cross of the Order of Pius IX (23 January 1932)

== Notes ==
Political offices
Preceded by Yamamoto Gonnohyōe	Minister of the Navy; 7 January 1906 – 16 April 1914	Succeeded by Yashiro Rokurō
Preceded by Hasegawa Yoshimichi	Japanese Governor-General of Korea; August 1919 – December 1927	Succeeded by Kazushige Ugaki; Acting
Preceded by Yamanashi Hanzō	Japanese Governor-General of Korea; August 1929 – June 1931	Succeeded by Kazushige Ugaki
Preceded by Takahashi Korekiyo; Acting	Prime Minister of Japan; 26 May 1932 – 8 July 1934	Succeeded by Okada Keisuke
Preceded by Kenkichi Yoshizawa	Minister of Foreign Affairs; May 1932 – July 1932	Succeeded by Uchida Kosai
Preceded by Ichirō Hatoyama	Minister of Education; May 1934 – July 1934	Succeeded by Genji Matsuda
Preceded by Makino Nobuaki	Lord Keeper of the Privy Seal; December 1935 – February 1936	Succeeded by Ichiki Kitokuro
