= Yamanashi Hanzō =

Japanese general (1864–1944)

Senior Third Rank Yamanashi Hanzō
- 山梨 半造
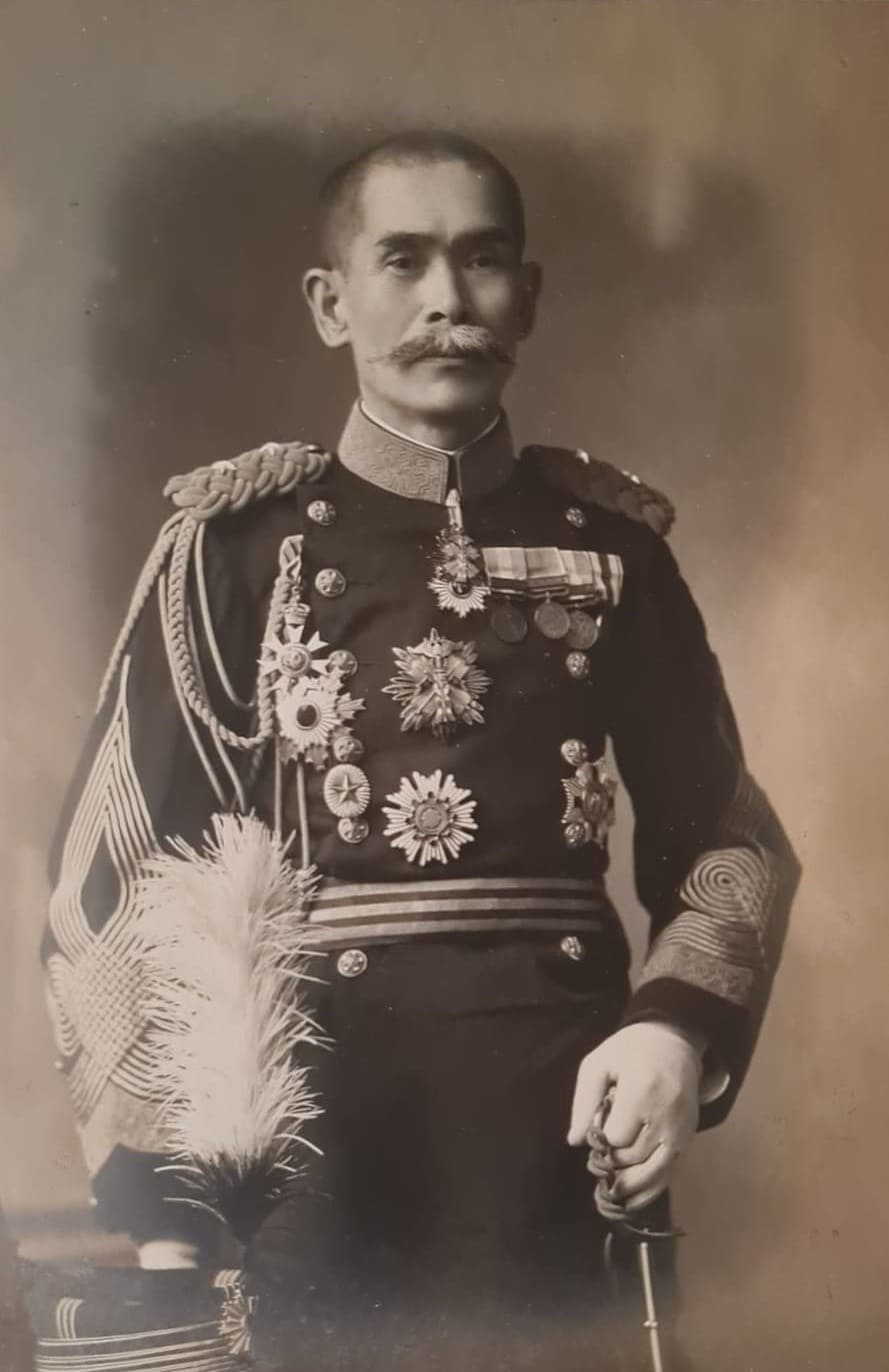

Governor-General of Korea
- In office 10 December 1927 – 17 August 1929
- Monarch: Hirohito
- Preceded by: Ugaki Kazushige
- Succeeded by: Saitō Makoto

Minister of the Army
- In office 9 June 1921 – 2 September 1923
- Prime Minister: Takahashi Korekiyo; Katō Tomosaburō
- Preceded by: Tanaka Giichi
- Succeeded by: Tanaka Giichi

Personal details
- Born: 6 April 1864 Hiratsuka, Sagami, Japan
- Died: 2 July 1944 (aged 80) Kamakura, Kanagawa, Japan
- Relatives: Masaharu Homma (brother-in-law)
- Military career
- Allegiance: Empire of Japan
- Branch: Imperial Japanese Army
- Service years: 1886–1927
- Rank: General
- Conflicts: First Sino-Japanese War; Russo-Japanese War; World War I

Yamanashi Hanzō (山梨 半造; 6 April 1864 – 2 July 1944) was a general in the Imperial Japanese Army, Army Minister and Governor-General of Korea from 1927 to 1929.

== Military career ==
A native of Osumi District in Sagami Province (part of the present-day city of Hiratsuka, Kanagawa Prefecture), Yamanashi graduated from the former 8th class of the Imperial Japanese Army Academy in 1886. After serving in the IJA 5th Infantry Regiment, he graduated with honors from the 8th class of the Army Staff College in 1892. He was assigned to the IJA 4th Infantry Brigade and served in combat as an infantry platoon commander during the First Sino-Japanese War with the IJA 2nd Army.

After the war, Yamanashi's rise through the ranks was steady and rapid. He served in a number of administrative and staff positions, before being posted to Germany as a military attaché from 1898 to 1902.

During the Russo-Japanese War of 1904 to 1905, Yamanashi was vice chief-of-staff of the IJA 2nd Army and subsequently chief-of-staff of the IJA 3rd Division. He was promoted to lieutenant commander in late 1904. He returned to Europe immediately after the end of the war as military attaché to Austria-Hungary, serving from the end of 1905 to 1907, and again to Germany from 1907.

Yamanashi was promoted to major general in 1911, and assigned command of the IJA 30th Infantry Brigade. He was transferred to the IJA 1st Infantry Brigade the following year. After serving in a number of administrative positions within the Imperial Japanese Army General Staff, he was assigned as chief-of-staff of the IJA 18th Division at the Battle of Tsingtao in World War I. In 1916, Yamanashi was promoted to lieutenant general, and in 1921 he was promoted to full general.

== Political career ==
From 1921 to 1923, Yamanashi served as Army Minister under the cabinets of Prime Ministers Hara, Takahashi and Katō Tomosaburō. As Army Minister, Yamanashi initiated reforms which cut 2200 officers and 60,000 men from the roster of the Imperial Japanese Army. This was equivalent to approximately five divisions, but as it was spread out across the entire army, the effects were less noticeable than the subsequent abolishment of four divisions outright by Yamanashi's successor, Ugaki Kazushige.

at the end of his tenure, the Imperial Japanese Army was still behind the other major powers in terms of mechanization and aviation.

During the 1923 Great Kantō earthquake, Yamanashi was appointed martial law commander of the Tokyo region, until the post was abolished in November 1923, but continued to be head of the Tokyo regional police forces through August 1924. In 1925 he was promoted to the honorific title of Junior Third Court Rank.

Yamanashi retired from active military service in 1927. From December 1927 to August 1929, Yamanashi served as Japanese Governor-General of Korea. He followed the relatively lenient policies established by his predecessors, and there was little significant change in Korea under Japanese rule during his tenure.

However, while in Korea, he became embroiled in a prominent corruption scandal in which he was accused of having accepted a very large bribe from a rice merchant who wanted to expand into the Korean market. The accusation had political overtones, as Yamanashi was increasingly involved in Rikken Seiyūkai politics and was being touted as a possible successor to his mentor, Tanaka Giichi. Although Yamanashi was acquitted, a number of his close associates were convicted, and he retired from public life at the end of 1929. Yamanashi died of natural causes at his home in Kamakura, Kanagawa in 1944 at the age of 80.

== Decorations ==
- 1915 – Order of the Golden Kite, 2nd class
- 1920 – Grand Cordon of the Order of the Rising Sun
