= Yamamoto Gonnohyōe =

Japanese statesman and Navy officer (1852–1933)

Junior First Rank Admiral Count Yamamoto Gonnohyōe CSOC GCSOC GCHL GCRE GCMG
- 山本 権兵衛
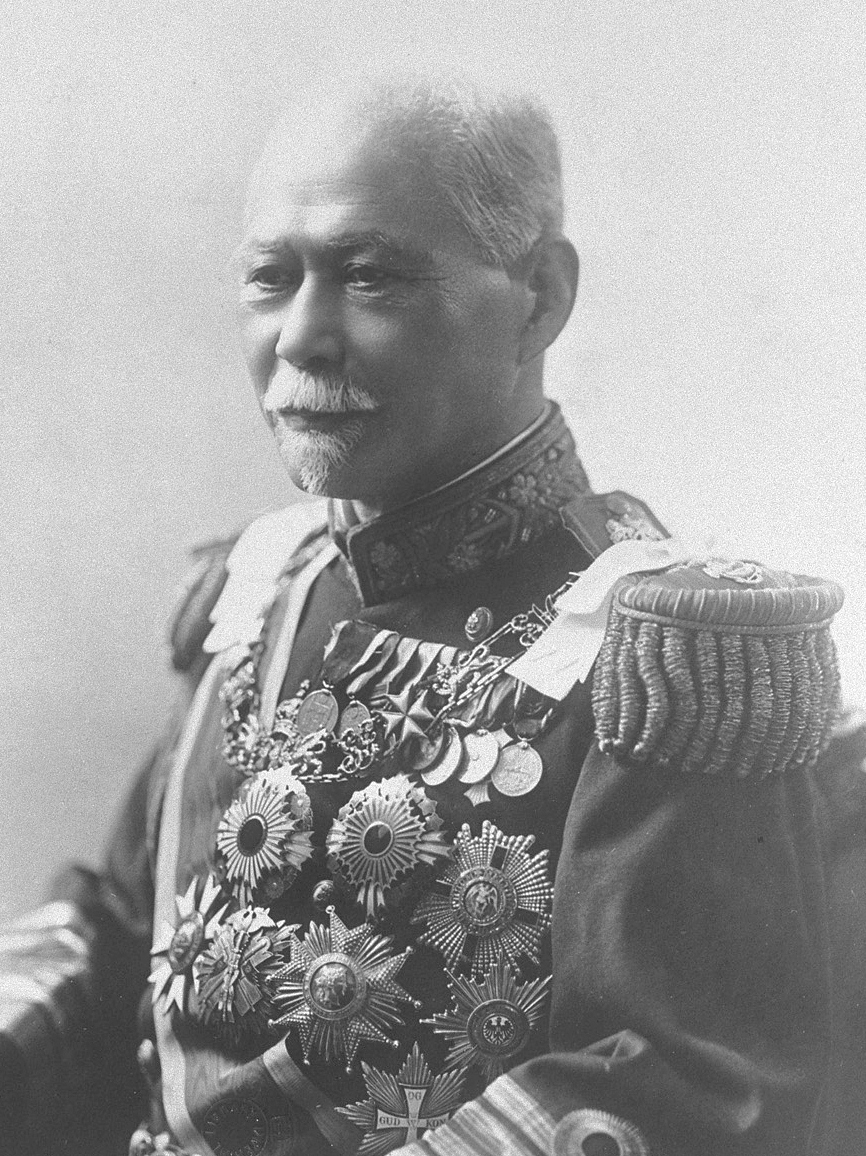

Prime Minister of Japan
- In office 2 September 1923 – 7 January 1924
- Monarch: Taishō
- Regent: Hirohito
- Preceded by: Katō Tomosaburō; Uchida Kōsai (acting)
- Succeeded by: Kiyoura Keigo
- In office 20 February 1913 – 16 April 1914
- Monarch: Taishō
- Preceded by: Katsura Tarō
- Succeeded by: Ōkuma Shigenobu

Minister for Foreign Affairs
- In office 2 September 1923 – 19 September 1923
- Prime Minister: Himself
- Preceded by: Uchida Kōsai
- Succeeded by: Ijūin Hikokichi

Minister of the Navy
- In office 8 November 1898 – 7 January 1906
- Prime Minister: Yamagata Aritomo; Itō Hirobumi; Katsura Tarō
- Preceded by: Saigō Jūdō
- Succeeded by: Saitō Makoto

Personal details
- Born: Yamamoto Gonbē; 26 November 1852 Kagoshima, Satsuma, Japan
- Died: 8 December 1933 (aged 81) Takanawa, Tokyo, Japan
- Cause of death: Benign prostatic hyperplasia
- Resting place: Aoyama Cemetery
- Party: Independent
- Spouse: Yamamoto Tokiko (m. 1878; died 1933)
- Education: Imperial Japanese Naval Academy
- Awards: Order of the Chrysanthemum (Collar and Grand Cordon); Order of the Golden Kite (1st class); Order of St Michael and St George (Honorary Knight Grand Cross)
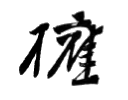
- Signature

Military service
- Allegiance: Empire of Japan
- Branch/service: Imperial Japanese Navy
- Years of service: 1874–1914
- Rank: Admiral
- Battles/wars: Boshin War; First Sino-Japanese War; Russo-Japanese War

Count Yamamoto Gonbē (Note: Japanese pronunciation: [ja.ma.mo.to (|) ɡoꜜm.beː]), also called Gonnohyōe (Note: The name Gonnohyōe (IPA: [ɡonnoçoːe]) was originally invented by a Shinto priest during a prayers at a ship launching ceremony which Yamamoto attended; he liked the profound sound of the name so much that he adopted it thereafter.) (山本 権兵衛, Yamamoto Gonbee/Gonnohyōe; 26 November 1852 – 8 December 1933), was an admiral in the Imperial Japanese Navy and twice Prime Minister of Japan from 1913 to 1914 and again from 1923 to 1924.

== Biography ==
=== Early life ===
Yamamoto was born in Kagoshima in Satsuma Province (now Kagoshima Prefecture) as the sixth son of a samurai who served as a secretary and sōjutsu master of the Shimazu clan. As a youth, he took part in the Anglo-Satsuma War. He later joined Satsuma's Eighth Rifle Troop in the Boshin War that ended the Tokugawa shogunate, fighting at the Battle of Toba–Fushimi and other locations; he was also aboard one of the ships that pursued Enomoto Takeaki and the remnants of the Tokugawa fleet to Hokkaido in 1869. After the success of the Meiji Restoration, Yamamoto attended preparatory schools in Tokyo and entered the 2nd class of the Imperial Japanese Naval Academy in 1870. At the time of the Satsuma Rebellion, he briefly returned to Kagoshima, but at the urging of Saigo Takamori, he returned to the Naval Academy before the start of combat.

=== Naval career ===
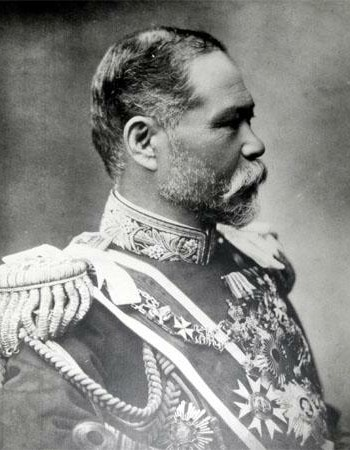
Yamamoto Gonnohyoe

After graduation in 1874, Yamamoto went on a training cruise to Europe and South America aboard Imperial German Navy vessels from 1877 to 1878, and as junior officer acquired much sea experience. He wrote a gunnery manual that became the standard for the Imperial Japanese Navy and served as executive officer of the cruiser Naniwa on its shakedown voyage from Elswick to Japan (1885 to 1886). After serving as captain of the corvette Amagi, he accompanied Navy Minister Kabayama Sukenori on a trip to the United States and Europe that lasted over a year (1887 to 1888).

As commander of the cruiser Takao, he undertook a confidential mission to meet Qing General Yuan Shikai in Hanseong (Seoul), Korea (1890). Afterwards, he assumed command of the Takachiho.

Working under his patron, Navy Minister Saigō Tsugumichi from 1893, Yamamoto became the real leader of the navy; initiating numerous reforms, attempting to end favoritism toward officers of his own Satsuma province, attempting to end officers from profiteering from military office, and attempting to attain roughly equal status with the Army in the Supreme War Council. He also pushed for an aggressive strategy towards the Chinese Empire in the First Sino-Japanese War (1894–95). Yamamoto was promoted to rear admiral in 1895 and to vice admiral in 1898.

=== As Minister of the Navy ===
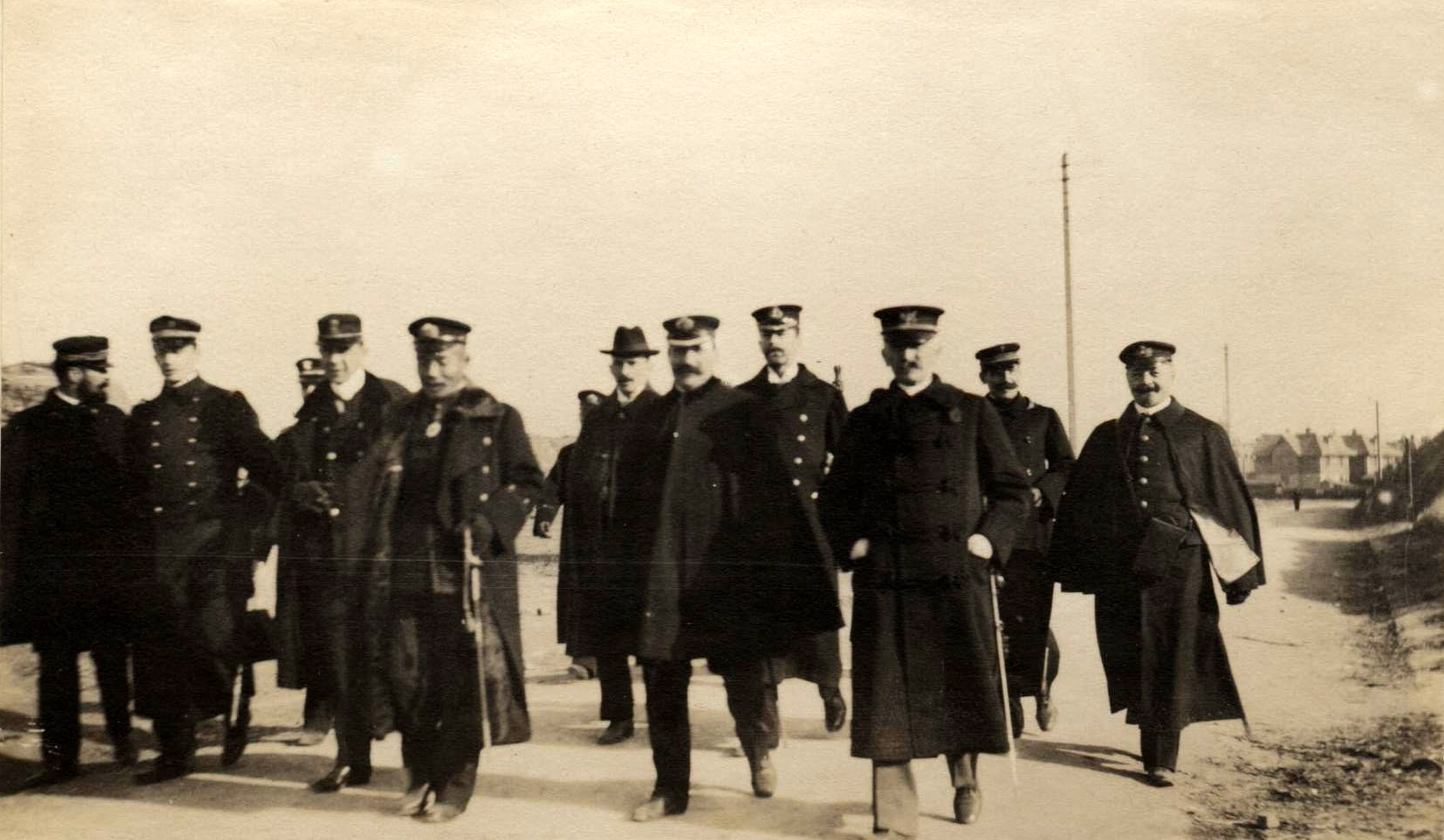
Japanese Minister of the Navy, Admiral Baron Yamamoto visiting the captured city of Dalny, just north of Port Arthur in December 1904. Accompanying the Minister were several Western observers, including Italian naval attaché Ernesto Burzagli who photographed the inspection tour.

In November 1898, Yamamoto was appointed Navy Minister under the second Yamagata Aritomo administration. By this time, the Russian Empire was already perceived as the greatest threat to Japan, and Yamamoto advised the government that it was possible that Japan would win a conflict against Russia, albeit at the cost of more than half of the Imperial Japanese Navy. He sponsored promising junior officers a "brain trust", including Akiyama Saneyuki and Hirose Takeo, whom he sent as naval attachés to the United States, United Kingdom and Russia to gather intelligence and to make strategic assessments of capabilities. Domestically, he pushed for increased capacity and modernisation of shipyards and steel mills, and for the increased import of higher quality coal from the United Kingdom to power his warships. Externally, he was a strong supporter of the Anglo-Japanese Alliance. As an indication of the increased independence and prestige of the Navy, Emperor Meiji appeared in naval uniform during a public appearance for the first time. Yamamoto was made baron (danshaku) under the kazoku peerage system in 1902; and he was promoted to the rank of admiral in 1904.

As Minister of the Navy during the Russo-Japanese War, Yamamoto showed strong leadership and was responsible for appointing Tōgō Heihachirō as commander-in-chief of the Combined Fleet. He gave voice to Tōgō's reports when he read aloud his reports from the war to the assembled Diet.

Yamamoto was replaced as Navy Minister by Saito Makoto in January 1906. He was elevated to count (hakushaku) in 1907.

== As Prime Minister ==
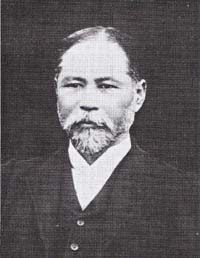
- Yamamoto during his premiership
- Premiership of Yamamoto Gonnohyōe
- Monarch: Emperor Taishō
- Party: Military (Navy)
- Seat: Naikaku Sōri Daijin Kantei
- First term 20 February 1913 – 16 April 1914
- Cabinet: First Yamamoto Cabinet
- Second term 2 September 1923 – 7 January 1924
- Cabinet: Second Yamamoto Cabinet
- Emblem of the Government of Japan

In February 1913, Yamamoto became Prime Minister of Japan, succeeding Katsura Taro as leader of the Rikken Seiyukai political party. During Yamamoto's first term as the prime minister, he abolished the rule that both the Navy Minister and Army Minister had to be active duty officers. This rule had given the military a stranglehold over the civilian government since the military could withdraw their minister and refuse to appoint a successor. Failure to fill the post would cause the existing cabinet to collapse. Thus, Yamamoto gained a reputation for being a liberal and a supporter of public claims for democracy and constitutional government. However, his administration was plagued by charges of corruption and he was forced to resign with his entire cabinet in April 1914 to take responsibility for the Siemens-Vickers Naval Armaments scandal, even though it was never proved that he was personally involved.

Under the succeeded Okuma administration, Yamamoto was transferred to naval reserves. During World War I and the subsequent disarmament treaty negotiations, he remained sidelined.

Yamamoto was recalled to government as Prime Minister again on 2 September 1923 in the emergency "earthquake cabinet" caused by the sudden death of Prime Minister Katō Tomosaburō immediately following the Great Kantō earthquake. He showed leadership in the restoration of Tokyo which had been heavily damaged by the earthquake. He also attempted to reform the electoral system to permit universal male suffrage. However, he and his cabinet were forced to resign again in January 1924, this time over the attempt by Namba Daisuke to assassinate Prince Regent Hirohito on 27 December 1923 (the Toranomon Incident).

Subsequently, Yamamoto withdrew from political life completely. Suggestions that he be made one of the Genrō were vehemently opposed by his life-long political enemy, Saionji Kinmochi, who also blocked all efforts for him to have a seat on the Privy Council. In December 1933, nine months after the death of his wife, Yamamoto died of complication due to benign prostatic hyperplasia at his home in Takanawa, Tokyo at the age of 82. His grave is at the Aoyama Cemetery in Tokyo.

== Honors ==
=== Peerages ===
- Baron (27 February 1902)
- Count (21 September 1907)

=== Japanese ===
- 1887 – Order of the Rising Sun, 6th class
- 1895 – Order of the Rising Sun, 4th class
- 1895 – Order of the Golden Kite, 4th class
- 1900 – Order of the Sacred Treasure, 2nd class
- 1901 – Grand Cordon of the Order of the Rising Sun
- 1906 – Order of the Golden Kite, 1st class
- 1906 – Order of the Rising Sun with Paulownia Flowers
- 1928 – Order of the Chrysanthemum
- 1930 – Grand Cordon of the Order of the Chrysanthemum

=== Foreign ===
- 1900 – - Prussia - Order of the Red Eagle, 1st class
- 1900 – - France - Legion of Honour, Grand officier
- 1907 – - France - Legion of Honour, Grand Croix
- 1907 – - Prussia - Order of the Red Eagle, Grand Cross
- 1907 – - UK - Order of St Michael and St George, Knight Grand Cross (GCMG).

== Sources ==
- Dupuy, Trevor N. (1992). Encyclopedia of Military Biography. I B Tauris & Co Ltd. ISBN 1-85043-569-3.
- Schencking, J. Charles (2005). Making Waves: Politics, Propaganda, And The Emergence Of The Imperial Japanese Navy, 1868–1922. Stanford University Press. ISBN 0-8047-4977-9.
- Sims, Richard (2005). Japanese Political History Since the Meiji Renovation 1868–2000. Palgrave Macmillan. ISBN 0-312-23915-7.

Political offices
Preceded by Saigō Tsugumichi	Minister of the Navy; 8 November 1898 – 7 January 1906	Succeeded by Saitō Makoto
Preceded by Katsura Tarō	Prime Minister of Japan; 20 February 1913 – 16 April 1914	Succeeded by Ōkuma Shigenobu
Preceded by Uchida Kōsai	Minister of Foreign Affairs; September 1923 – September 1923	Succeeded by Ijuin Hikokichi
Preceded by Uchida Kōsai; Acting	Prime Minister of Japan; 2 September 1923 –7 January 1924	Succeeded by Kiyoura Keigo
