= Takahashi Korekiyo =

Prime Minister of Japan from 1921 to 1922

Senior Second Rank Viscount Takahashi Korekiyo
- 高橋 是清
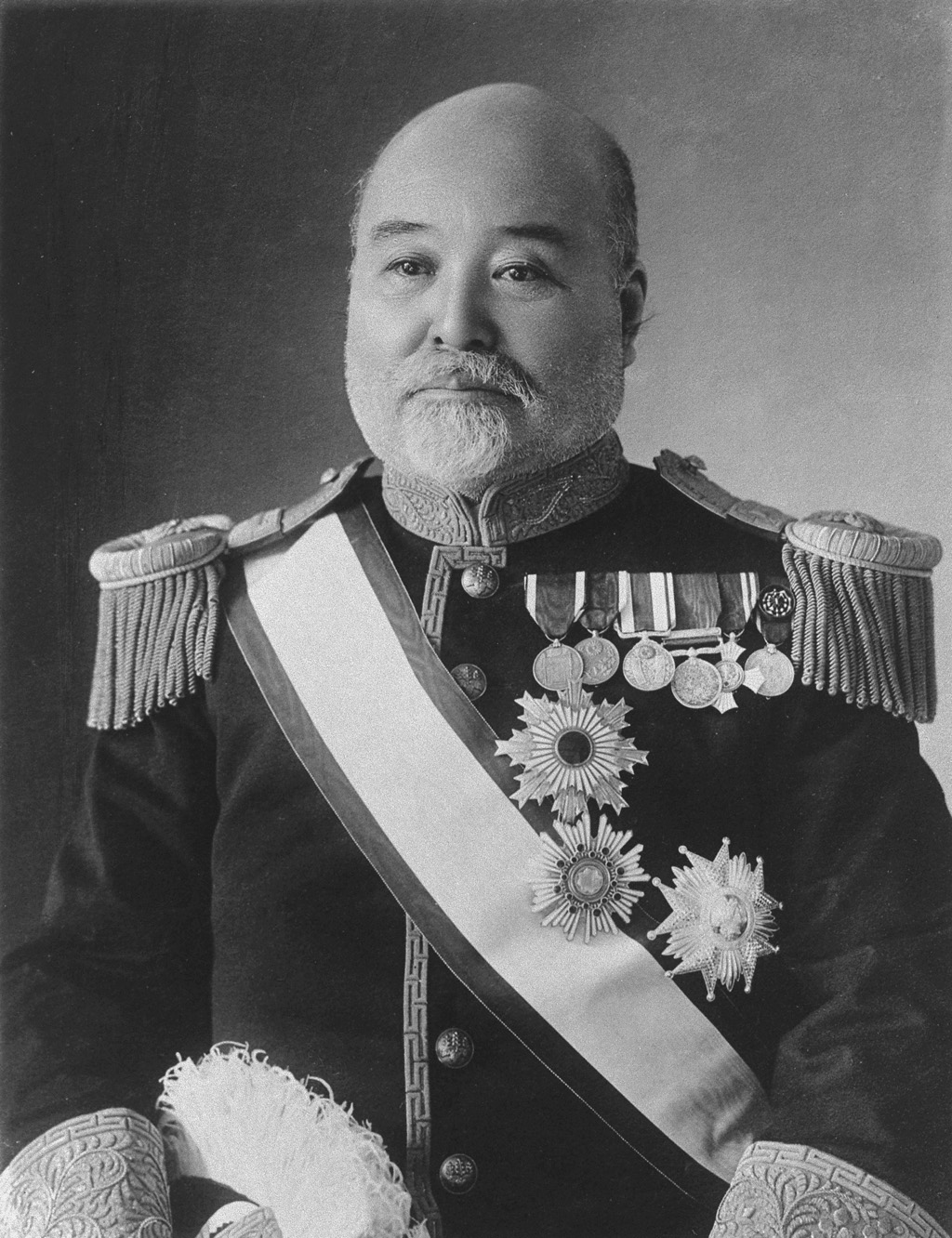

Prime Minister of Japan
- In office 13 November 1921 – 12 June 1922
- Monarch: Taishō
- Regent: Hirohito
- Preceded by: Hara Takashi; Uchida Kōsai (acting)
- Succeeded by: Katō Tomosaburō

President of the Rikken Seiyūkai
- In office 13 November 1921 – 10 April 1925
- Preceded by: Hara Takashi
- Succeeded by: Tanaka Giichi
Ministerial offices
Minister of Finance
In office 27 November 1934 – 26 February 1936
Prime Minister	Keisuke Okada
Preceded by	Sadanobu Fujii
Succeeded by	Machida Chūji
In office 13 December 1931 – 8 July 1934
Prime Minister	Inukai Tsuyoshi; Saitō Makoto
Preceded by	Junnosuke Inoue
Succeeded by	Sadanobu Fujii
In office 20 April 1927 – 2 June 1927
Prime Minister	Tanaka Giichi
Preceded by	Kataoka Naoharu
Succeeded by	Chūzō Mitsuchi
In office 29 September 1918 – 12 June 1922
Prime Minister	Hara Takashi; Himself
Preceded by	Kazue Shōda
Succeeded by	Otohiko Ichiki
In office 20 February 1913 – 16 April 1914
Prime Minister	Yamamoto Gonnohyōe
Preceded by	Wakatsuki Reijirō
Succeeded by	Wakatsuki Reijirō
Acting Prime Minister of Japan
In office 15 May 1932 – 26 May 1932
Monarch	Hirohito
Preceded by	Inukai Tsuyoshi
Succeeded by	Saitō Makoto
Minister of Agriculture and Forestry
In office 1 April 1925 – 17 April 1925
Prime Minister	Katō Takaaki
Preceded by	Office established
Succeeded by	Okazaki Kunisuke
Minister of Commerce and Industry
In office 1 April 1925 – 17 April 1925
Prime Minister	Katō Takaaki
Preceded by	Office established
Succeeded by	Noda Utarō
Minister of Agriculture and Commerce
In office 11 June 1924 – 1 April 1925
Prime Minister	Katō Takaaki
Preceded by	Maeda Toshisada
Succeeded by	Tatsunosuke Yamazaki (1943)

Member of the House of Representatives
- In office 10 May 1924 – 21 January 1928
- Preceded by: Umatarō Ōya
- Succeeded by: Constituency abolished
- Constituency: Iwate 1st

Member of the House of Peers
- In office 29 January 1905 – 24 March 1924 Nominated by the Emperor

Personal details
- Born: 27 July 1854 Edo, Musashi, Japan
- Died: 26 February 1936 (aged 81) Akasaka, Tokyo, Japan
- Cause of death: Assassination (gunshot wound)
- Resting place: Tama Reien Cemetery, Tokyo
- Party: Rikken Seiyūkai
- Spouse: Takahashi Shina (m. 1890)
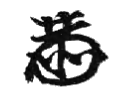
- Signature
- Nickname: Keynes of Japan

Viscount Takahashi Korekiyo (高橋 是清; 27 July 1854 – 26 February 1936) was a Japanese politician who served as prime minister of Japan from 1921 to 1922 and Minister of Finance when he was assassinated. He was also a member of the House of Peers and head of the Bank of Japan.

Takahashi made many contributions to Japan's development during the early 20th century, including introducing its first patent system and securing foreign financing for the Russo-Japanese War. Following the onset of the Great Depression, he introduced controversial financial policies which included abandoning the gold standard, lowering interest rates, and using the Bank of Japan to finance deficit spending by the central government. His decision to cut government spending in 1935 led to unrest within the Japanese military, who assassinated him in February 1936. Takahashi's policies are credited for pulling Japan out of the Depression, but led to soaring inflation following his assassination, as Takahashi's successors became highly reluctant to cut off funding to the government.

== Early life and education ==
Takahashi was born in Edo (modern-day Tokyo), while Japan was still under the Tokugawa shogunate. He was the illegitimate son of a court painter in residence at Edo Castle, and adopted as the son of Takahashi Kakuji, a low-ranking samurai in the service of the Date daimyō of Sendai Domain. He studied the English language and American culture in a private school run by the missionary James Hepburn (the forerunner of Meiji Gakuin University). On 25 July 1867, he set sail from Japan to Oakland, California, in the United States, and found employment as a menial laborer. Another version of the story has it that he went to the United States to study, but was sold as a slave by his landlord and only with some difficulty was he able to return to Japan.

== Bureaucratic career ==
After his return to Japan in 1868, Takahashi taught English conversation. He later became the first master of the Kyōryū Gakkō high school in Tokyo (currently Kaisei Academy), and at the same time worked as a low-ranking bureaucrat in the Ministry of Education, and then in the Ministry of Agriculture and Commerce. He was appointed as the first chief of the Bureau of Patents, a department of the Ministry of Agriculture and Commerce, and helped organized the patent system in Japan. At one point, he resigned his government positions and went to Peru to start a silver mining enterprise, but failed.

Takahashi became an employee of the Bank of Japan in 1892, and his talents were soon recognized, as he rose to become vice-president in 1898.

During and after the Russo-Japanese War of 1904–1905, Takahashi raised foreign loans that were critical to Japan's war effort. He met personally with American financier Jacob Schiff, who floated half of Japan's loans in the U.S. He also raised loans from the Rothschild family in Britain.

For this success, he was appointed to the House of Peers of the Diet of Japan in 1905.

Takahashi was named president of the Yokohama Specie Bank in 1906. He was made a baron (danshaku) under the kazoku peerage system in 1907.

Takahashi was Governor of the Bank of Japan from 1 June 1911, through 20 February 1913.

== Political career ==
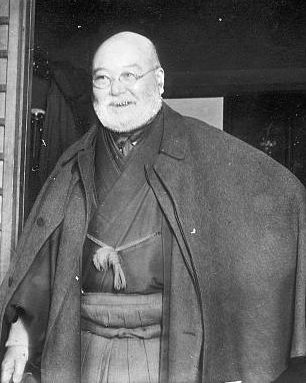
Takahashi Korekiyo, late 1920s

In 1913, Takahashi was appointed Minister of Finance by Prime Minister Yamamoto Gonnohyōe and then joined the Rikken Seiyūkai political party. He was re-appointed by Prime Minister Hara Takashi in 1918. In 1920, Takahashi's title was elevated to viscount (shishaku).

== Premiership (1921–1922) ==
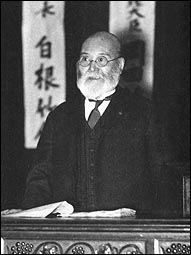
- Takahashi in 1935 or 1936
- Premiership of Takahashi Korekiyo; 13 November 1921 – 12 June 1922
- Monarch: Emperor Taishō
- Cabinet: Takahashi Cabinet
- Party: Rikken Seiyūkai
- Seat: Naikaku Sōri Daijin Kantei
- Emblem of the Government of Japan

After Hara was assassinated in 1921, Takahashi was appointed both Prime Minister and the Rikken Seiyūkai party president.

Takahashi was the second Christian Prime Minister in Japanese history. His term lasted less than seven months, primarily due to his inability as an outsider to control the factions in his party, and his lack of a power base in the party.

== Post-premiership ==
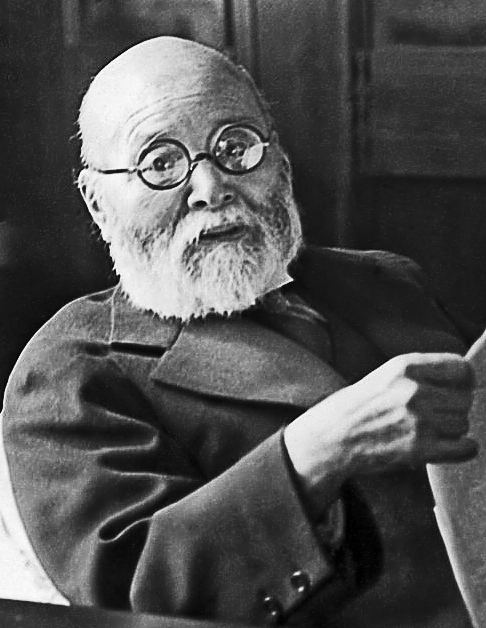
Takahashi Korekiyo in 1934

After resigning as Prime Minister, Takahashi still retained the position of president of the Rikken Seiyūkai. He resigned his seat in the House of Peers in 1924, and was elected to a seat in the Lower House of the Diet of Japan in the 1924 General Election. When Katō Takaaki became the prime minister and set up a coalition cabinet in 1924, Takahashi accepted the post of Minister of Agriculture and Commerce. He divided the department into the Ministry of Agriculture and Forestry and the Ministry of Commerce and Industry. Takahashi resigned from the Rikken Seiyūkai in 1925.

Takahashi served as Finance Minister under the administrations of Tanaka Giichi (1927–1929), Inukai Tsuyoshi (1931–1932), Saitō Makoto (1932–1934) and Keisuke Okada (1934–1936). To bring Japan out of the Great Depression of 1929, he instituted dramatically expansionary monetary and fiscal policy, abandoning the gold standard in December 1931, and running deficits.

== Assassination ==
Despite considerable success, his fiscal policies involving reduction of military expenditures created many enemies within the military; and he was among those assassinated by rebelling military officers in the February 26 incident of 1936. His grave is at the Tama Reien Cemetery in Fuchū, Tokyo. Along with Saitō Makoto (who was also assassinated during the Incident), Takahashi would be the last former Japanese prime minister to be assassinated until the assassination of Shinzo Abe 86 years later in 2022.

== Honours ==
From the corresponding article in the Japanese Wikipedia

=== Peerages ===
- Baron (23 September 1907)
- Viscount (7 September 1920)

=== Decorations ===
- Grand Cordon of the Order of the Sacred Treasure (1 April 1906; 5th Class: 28 December 1902; 6th Class: 25 October 1889)
- Grand Cordon of the Order of the Rising Sun (7 September 1920)
- Grand Cross of the Légion d'honneur (3 July 1924)
- Grand Cordon of the Order of the Paulownia Flowers (3 June 1927)
- Grand Cordon of the Order of the Chrysanthemum (26 February 1936; posthumous)
- Senior Second Rank (26 February 1936; posthumous)

== Legacy ==
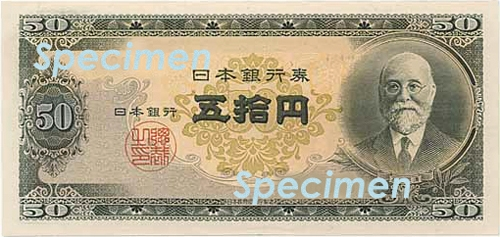
Series B 50-yen bank note of Japan

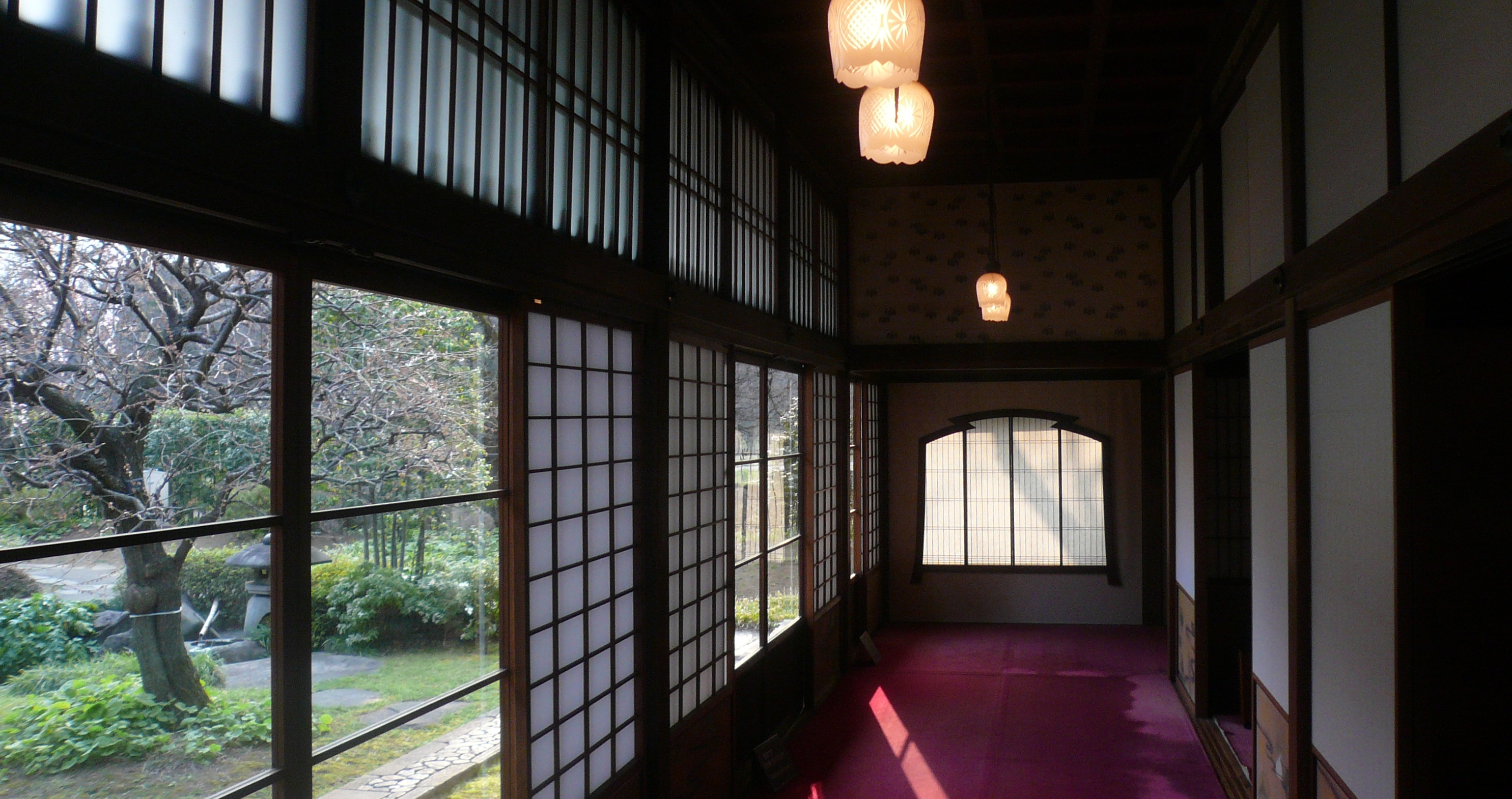
Inside Takahashi Korekiyo residence, now at the Edo-Tokyo Open Air Architectural Museum

- Takahashi appeared on a 50 Yen banknote issued by the Bank of Japan in 1951. It is the only time that a former president of the Bank of Japan has appeared on one of Japan's banknotes.
- Takahashi's Tokyo residence is now the "Takahashi Korekiyo Memorial Park" in Tokyo's Minato Ward, Akasaka. However, a portion of the building survives in the Edo-Tokyo Open Air Architectural Museum in Koganei city, Tokyo.
- Takahashi's fiscal and monetary policies during the Great Depression were in many ways similar to what Keynes later published just a few years later in 1936 in The General Theory of Employment, Interest and Money. It is thought but not proven that Takahashi's success contributed heavily to Keynes' theories.
- Ben Bernanke, chairman of the United States Federal Reserve, characterized Takahashi as a man who "brilliantly rescued Japan from the Great Depression", and Japanese prime minister Shinzō Abe cited Takahashi as an inspiration for his Abenomics policies. On the other hand, Bank of Japan president Masaaki Shirakawa characterized Takahashi's policies of central bank support for the government as a "bitter experience", and in 1982 the Bank of Japan itself characterized Takahashi's Depression-era policies as "the bank's biggest mistake in its 100-year history".

== Notes ==
Government offices
Preceded by Shigeyoshi Matsuo	Governor of the Bank of Japan; Jun 1911 – Feb 1913	Succeeded by Yatarō Mishima
Political offices
Preceded by Wakatsuki Reijirō	Minister of Finance; Feb 1913 – Apr 1914	Succeeded by Wakatsuki Reijirō
Preceded by Kazue Shōda	Minister of Finance; Sept 1918 – Jun 1922	Succeeded by Otohiko Ichiki
Preceded by Hara Takashi	Prime Minister of Japan; Nov 1921 – Jun 1922	Succeeded by Katō Tomosaburō
Preceded by Toshisada Maeda	Minister of Agriculture & Commerce; Jun 1924 – Apr 1925	Succeeded by position abolished
Preceded by none	Minister of Commerce & Industry; Apr 1925	Succeeded by Noda Utarō
Preceded by none	Minister of Agriculture and Forestry; Apr 1925	Succeeded by Okazaki Kunisuke
Preceded by Seinosuke Yokota	Minister of Justice; Feb 1925	Succeeded by Heikichi Ogawa
Preceded by Kataoka Naoharu	Minister of Finance; Apr–Jun 1927	Succeeded by Chōzō Mitsuchi
Preceded by Junnosuke Inoue	Minister of Finance; Dec 1931 – Jul 1934	Succeeded by Sadanobu Fujii
Preceded by Sadanobu Fujii	Minister of Finance; Nov 1934 – Feb 1936	Succeeded by Chōji Machida
