= Uchida Kōsai =

Japanese politician and diplomat (1865–1936)

Junior First Rank Count Uchida Kōsai
- 内田 康哉
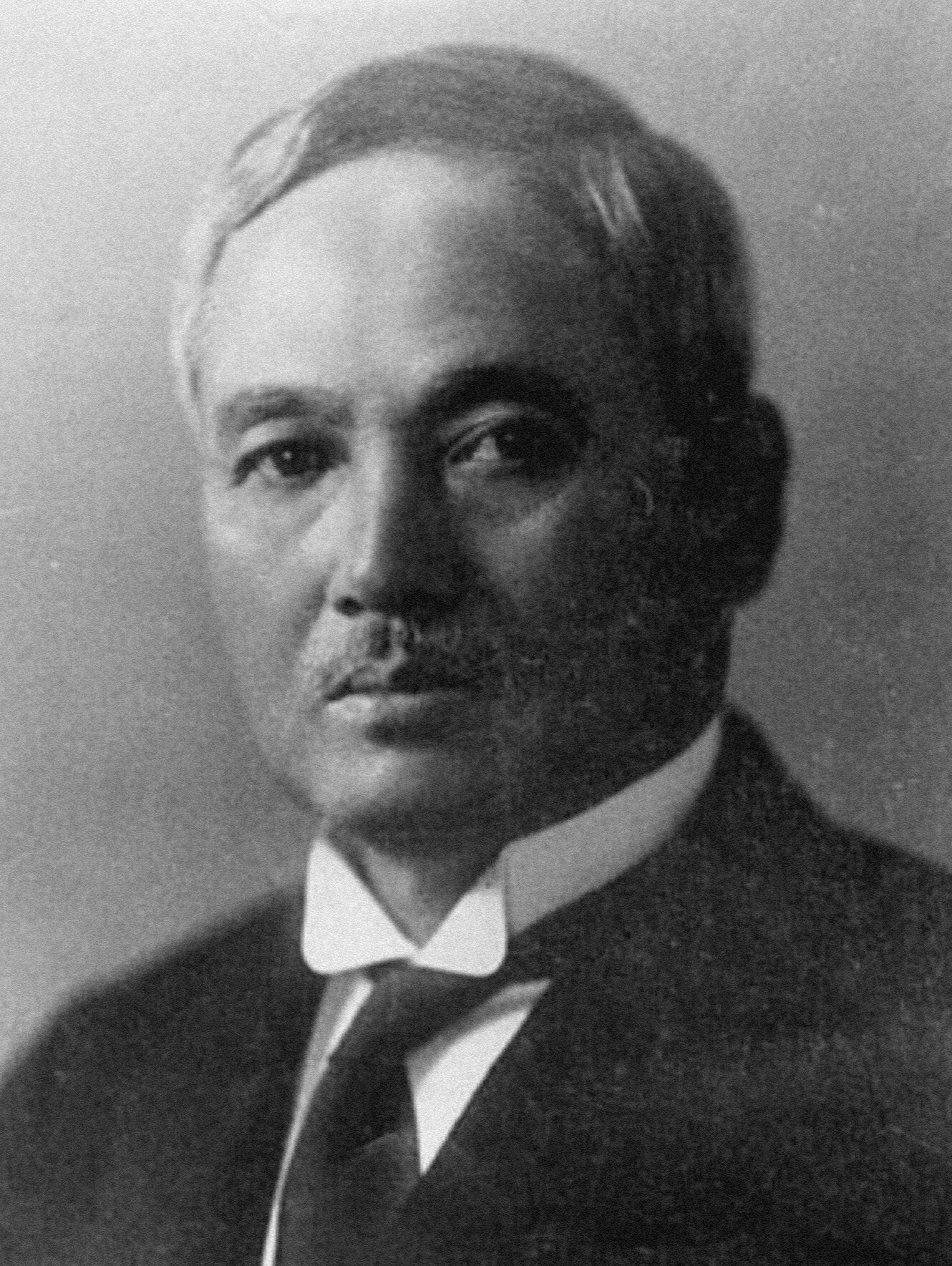

Acting Prime Minister of Japan
- In office 24 August 1923 – 2 September 1923
- Monarch: Taishō
- Regent: Hirohito
- Preceded by: Katō Tomosaburō
- Succeeded by: Yamamoto Gonnohyōe
- In office 4 November 1921 – 13 November 1921
- Monarch: Taishō
- Preceded by: Hara Takashi
- Succeeded by: Takahashi Korekiyo

Minister for Foreign Affairs
- In office 6 July 1932 – 14 September 1933
- Prime Minister: Saitō Makoto
- Preceded by: Saitō Makoto
- Succeeded by: Kōki Hirota
- In office 29 September 1918 – 2 September 1923
- Prime Minister: Hara Takashi; Takahashi Korekiyo; Katō Tomosaburō
- Preceded by: Gotō Shinpei
- Succeeded by: Yamamoto Gonnohyōe
- In office 30 August 1911 – 21 December 1912
- Prime Minister: Saionji Kinmochi
- Preceded by: Komura Jutarō
- Succeeded by: Katsura Tarō

Member of the House of Peers
- In office 11 April 1930 – 12 March 1936 Nominated by the Emperor

President of the South Manchuria Railway
- In office 13 June 1931 – 6 July 1932
- Preceded by: Sengoku Mitsugu
- Succeeded by: Hirotarō Hayashi

Member of the Privy Council
- In office 30 March 1925 – 26 June 1929
- Monarchs: Taishō; Hirohito

Personal details
- Born: 17 November 1865 Yatsushiro, Higo, Japan
- Died: 12 March 1936 (aged 70) Yodobashi, Tokyo, Japan
- Party: Independent
- Education: Doshisha University; Tokyo Imperial University

Count Uchida Kōsai (内田 康哉; 17 November 1865 – 12 March 1936) was a statesman, diplomat and interim prime minister, active in Meiji, Taishō and Shōwa period Japan. He was also known as Uchida Yasuya.

== Biography ==
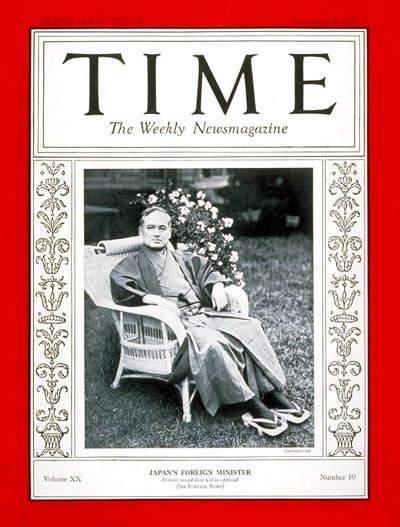
Uchida Kōsai on Time Magazine cover (1932)

Uchida was born in what is now Yatsushiro, Kumamoto Prefecture, as the son of the domain's doctor. After studying English for two years at Doshisha University, Uchida moved to Tokyo Imperial University, graduating from its law school.

After graduation, Uchida entered the Ministry of Foreign Affairs, and served as ambassador to Qing dynasty China, then as ambassador to Austria-Hungary, and then to the United States. He served as Japanese foreign minister from 1911 to 1912 under the Second Saionji Cabinet.

Appointed as ambassador to the Empire of Russia just before the Bolshevik Revolution, Uchida returned to Japan to serve as Foreign Minister again from 1918 to 1923 under the Hara, Takahashi, and Katō administrations. He served as acting Prime Minister of Japan twice – once after the assassination of Prime Minister Hara, and again after the sudden death of Prime Minister Katō, immediately before the Great Kantō earthquake.

He was appointed to the House of Peers in the Diet of Japan in 1930, and became President of the South Manchuria Railway company in 1931.

In addition to being appointed Prime Minister on 26 May 1932, Saitō Makoto was also appointed to be interim Foreign Minister following the assassination of Inukai Tsuyoshi. Saitō offered the position of Foreign Minister to Uchida. Under his third term, Uchida called for the formal diplomatic recognition of Manchukuo, and later called for Japan's withdrawal from the League of Nations. He was featured on the cover of Time, 5 September 1932 edition, which also contained an article on his stance vis-à-vis the League of Nations. He died of illness 15 days after the 26 February Incident. His grave is at the Tama Reien at Fuchu, Tokyo.

== In popular culture ==
Uchida Kōsai was portrayed by Ken'ichi Miura in the 2006 Chinese television series Princess Der Ling.

Political offices
Preceded by Komura Jutarō	Minister of Foreign Affairs; 1911–1912	Succeeded by Katsura Tarō
Preceded by Gotō Shinpei	Minister of Foreign Affairs; 1918–1923	Succeeded by Yamamoto Gonnohyōe
Preceded by Hara Takashi	Prime Minister of Japan; Acting; 1921	Succeeded by Takahashi Korekiyo
Preceded by Hara Takashi; Acting	Minister of the Navy; 1921	Succeeded by Takahashi Korekiyo; Acting
Preceded by Katō Tomosaburō	Prime Minister of Japan; Acting; 1923	Succeeded by Yamamoto Gonnohyōe
Preceded by Saitō Makoto	Minister of Foreign Affairs; 1932–1933	Succeeded by Hirota Kōki
