= Katō Tomosaburō =

Japanese naval officer, prime minister from 1922 to 1923

Senior Second Rank Marshal-Admiral Viscount Katō Tomosaburō
- 加藤 友三郎
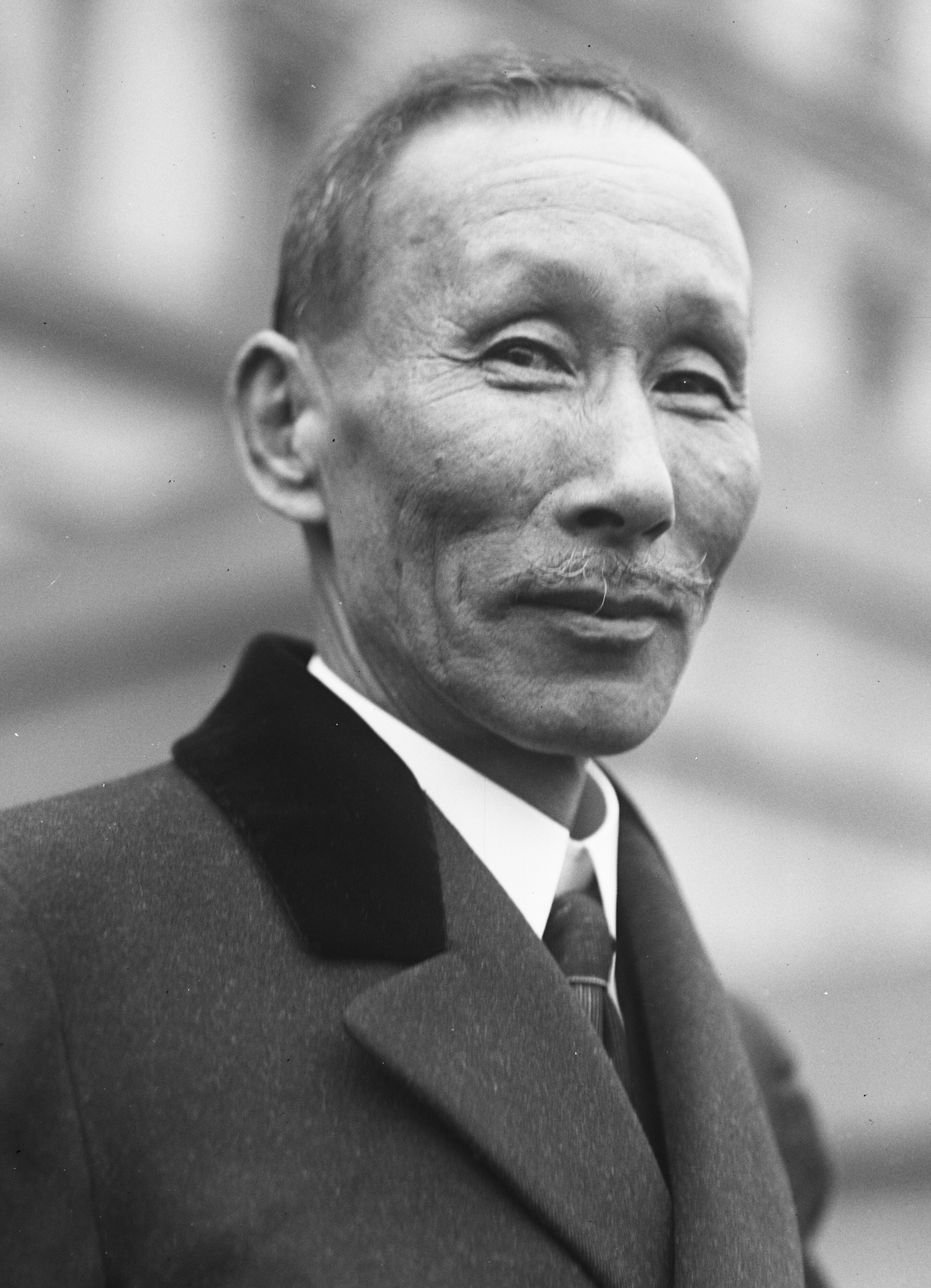

Prime Minister of Japan
- In office 12 June 1922 – 24 August 1923
- Monarch: Taishō
- Regent: Hirohito
- Preceded by: Takahashi Korekiyo
- Succeeded by: Uchida Kōsai (acting); Yamamoto Gonnohyōe

Minister of the Navy
- In office 10 August 1915 – 15 May 1923
- Prime Minister: Ōkuma Shigenobu; Terauchi Masatake; Hara Takashi; Takahashi Korekiyo; Himself
- Preceded by: Yashiro Rokuro
- Succeeded by: Takeshi Takarabe

Personal details
- Born: 22 February 1861 Hiroshima Domain, Aki Province, Japan
- Died: 24 August 1923 (aged 62) Tokyo, Japan
- Cause of death: Colon cancer
- Resting place: Aoyama Cemetery
- Party: Independent
- Spouse: Katō Kiyoko (m. 1890)
- Education: Imperial Japanese Naval Academy
- Awards: Order of the Chrysanthemum (Grand Cordon)
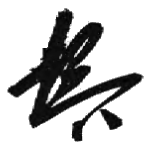
- Signature

Military service
- Allegiance: Empire of Japan
- Branch/service: Imperial Japanese Navy
- Years of service: 1873–1923
- Rank: Marshal Admiral
- Commands: Tsukushi, Naval Affairs Bureau, Kure Naval District, 1st Fleet
- Battles/wars: First Sino-Japanese War; Russo-Japanese War; Battle of Tsushima

Marshal-Admiral Viscount Katō Tomosaburō (加藤 友三郎; 22 February 1861 – 24 August 1923) was a career officer in the Imperial Japanese Navy, cabinet minister, and Prime Minister of Japan from 1922 to 1923.

== Early life and education ==
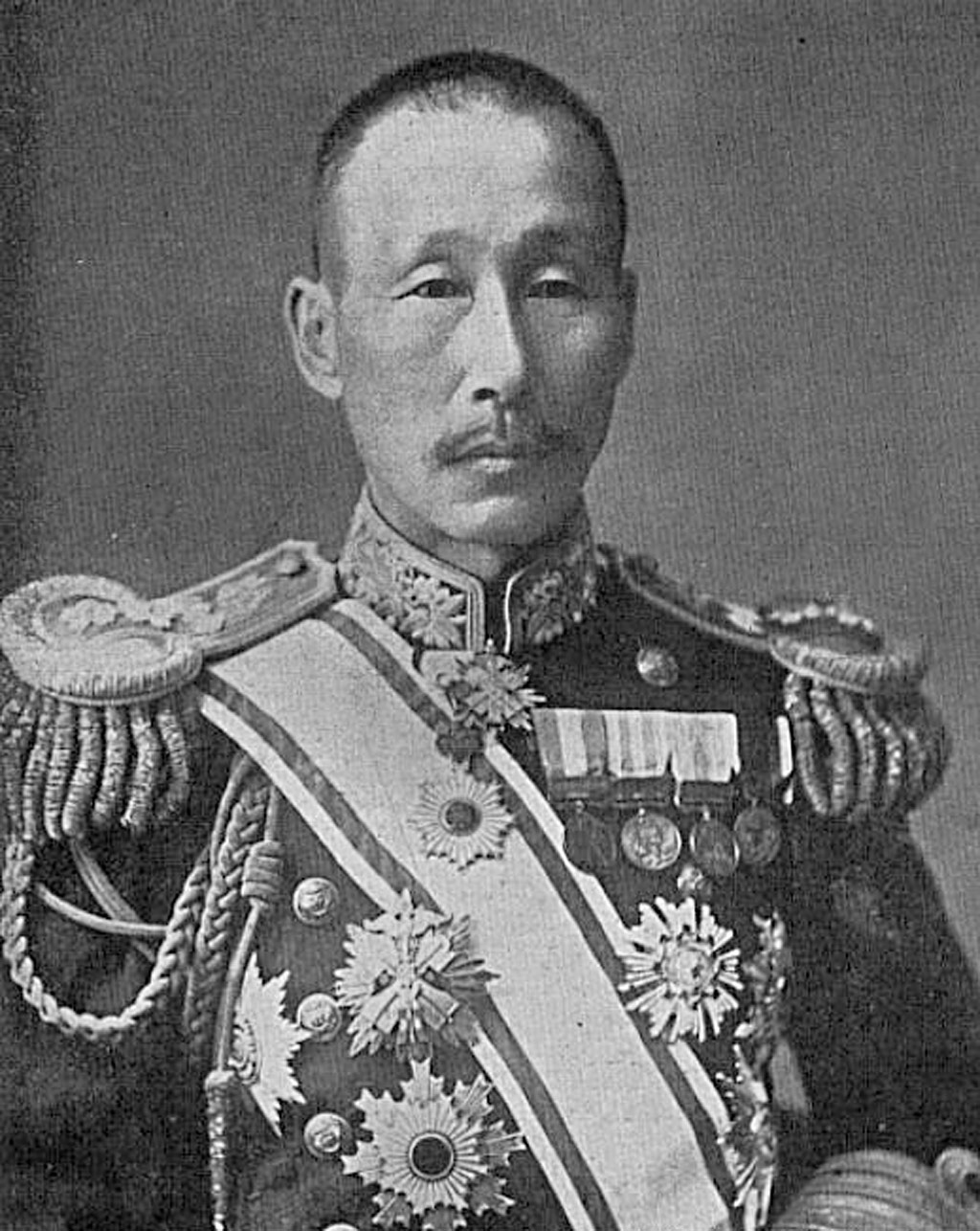
Katō Tomosaburō wears a formal uniform

Born in Hiroshima, Aki Province (modern Hiroshima Prefecture) to a samurai family, Katō enrolled in the 7th class Imperial Japanese Naval Academy and graduated second out of a class of 30 cadets. He specialized in both naval artillery and in navigation.

== Naval career ==
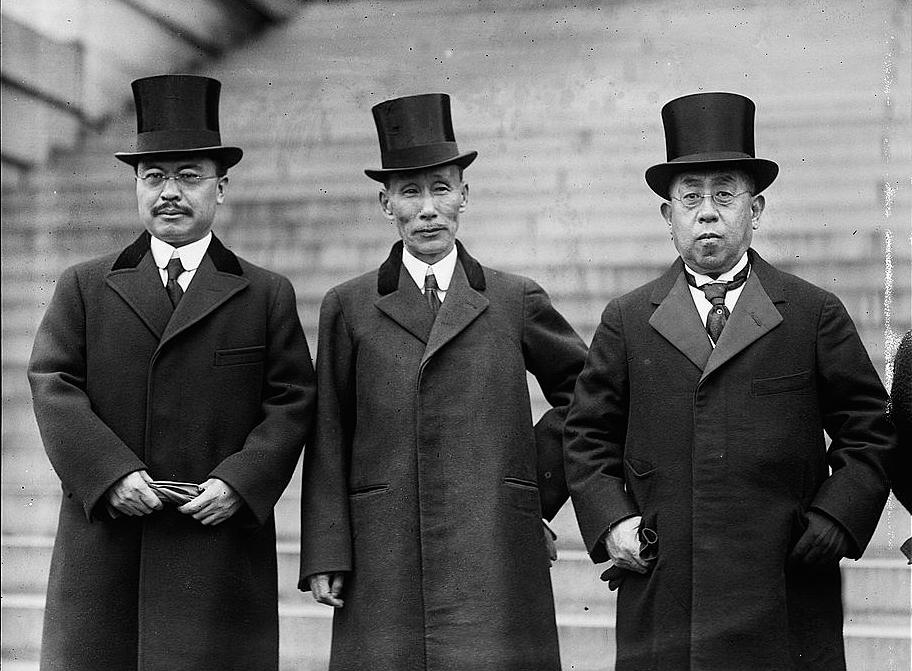
From left to right, Kijūrō Shidehara, Katō and Iesato Tokugawa on November 3, 1921, to attend the Washington Naval Conference.

After his commissioning as lieutenant, Katō served on the corvette Tsukuba in 1887, followed by the cruiser Takachiho. During the First Sino-Japanese War, he served in a combat position as gunnery officer on the cruiser Yoshino. After the end of the war, he served in numerous staff positions before promotion to commander. He was executive officer on the battleship Yashima, and captain of the Tsukushi. He was promoted to rear admiral on 1 September 1904.

During the Russo-Japanese War, Katō served as chief of staff to Admiral Tōgō Heihachirō on the battleship Mikasa, assisting in Japan's victory at the Battle of Tsushima. During this time, he suffered from a very weak stomach, and was vomiting as he issued orders throughout the battle, despite having taken large amounts of medication.

Katō became Vice Minister of the Navy in 1906, and was promoted to vice admiral on 28 August 1908. In 1909, he was appointed commander of the Kure Naval District, and in 1913 became Commander in Chief of the Combined Fleet.

Katō became Minister of the Navy in August 1915, days before his promotion to full admiral on 28 August 1915. He served in this post in the cabinets of Ōkuma Shigenobu, Terauchi Masatake, Hara Takashi, and Takahashi Korekiyo. Under Hara and Takahashi, Katō was Japan's chief commissioner plenipotentiary to the Washington Naval Conference, and worked with Ambassador Shidehara Kijurō in the negotiations that led to the Five-Power Treaty.

== Premiership (1922–1923) ==
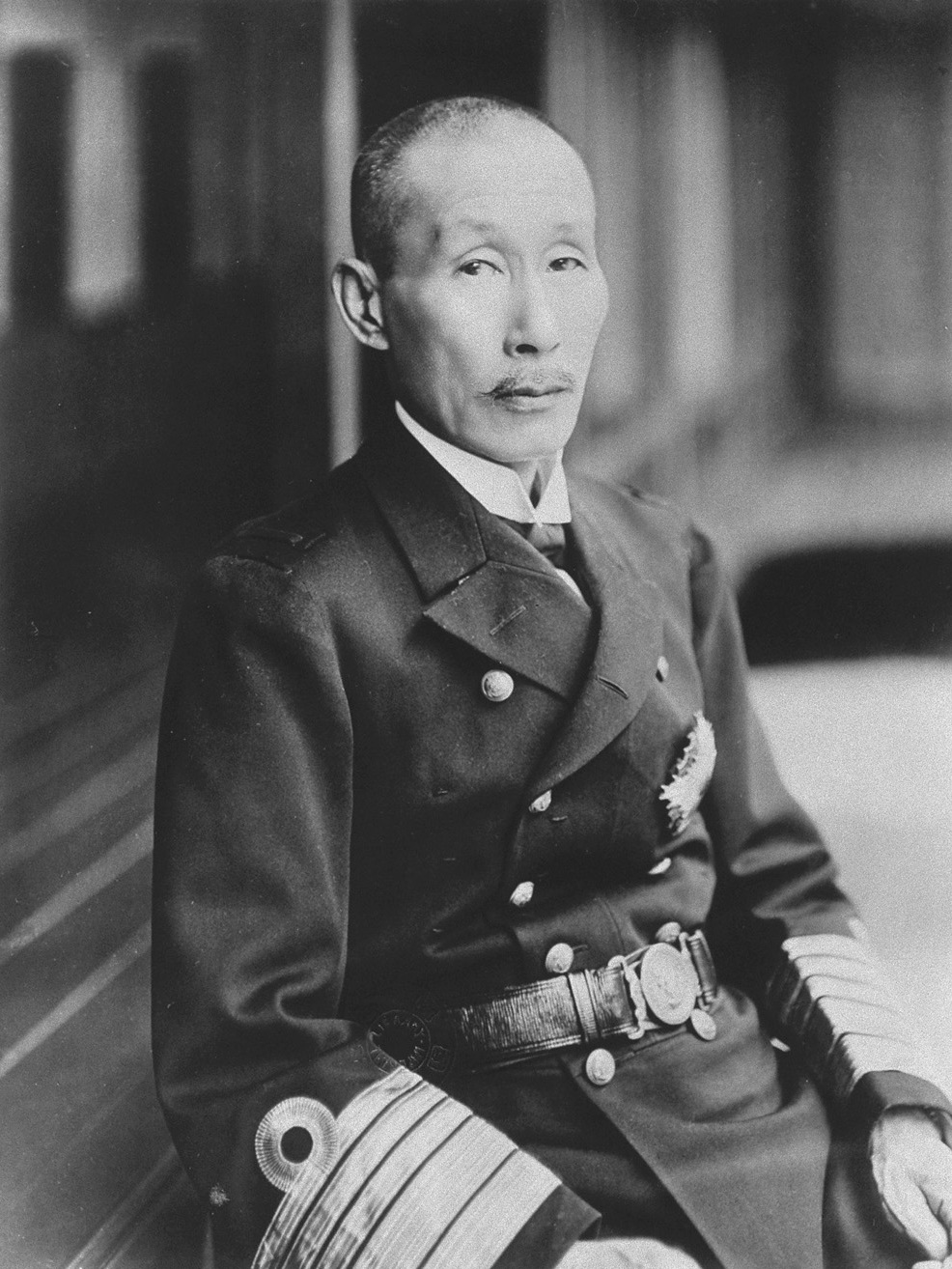
- Katō before 1923
- Premiership of Katō Tomosaburō; 12 June 1922 – 24 August 1923
- Monarch: Emperor Taishō
- Cabinet: Katō Tomosaburō Cabinet
- Party: Military (Navy)
- Seat: Naikaku Sōri Daijin Kantei
- Emblem of the Government of Japan

Following his return to Japan, Katō was appointed 21st Prime Minister of Japan in recognition of his performance at the Washington Naval Conference. His cabinet consisted mainly of bureaucrats and members of the House of Peers, which proved unpopular with the Imperial Japanese Army. During his tenure as prime minister, Katō implemented the provisions of the Washington Naval Agreement, withdrew Japanese forces from Shandong in China and ended Japanese participation in the Siberian Intervention.

== Death ==
Katō succumbed to late-stage colon cancer and died a little over a year into his term.

Katō was given the honorary rank of Marshal Admiral the day before his death, and posthumously awarded the Grand Cordon of the Supreme Order of the Chrysanthemum and his title raised to shishaku (viscount).

His death came only a week before the Great Kantō earthquake of 1923, and therefore Japan was without a prime minister during that disaster.

Katō's grave is at Aoyama Cemetery, Tokyo.

== Honors ==
From the corresponding article in the Japanese Wikipedia

- Order of the Golden Kite, 2nd class (1 April 1906; Fifth Class: 27 September 1895)
- Grand Cordon of the Order of the Sacred Treasure (28 November 1913; Second Class: 30 November 1905; Fifth Class: 9 May 1899; Sixth Class: 24 November 1894)
- Grand Cordon of the Order of the Rising Sun (14 July 1916; Second Class: 1 April 1906; Sixth Class: 27 September 1895)
- Baron (7 September 1920)
- Grand Cordon of the Order of the Paulownia Flowers (7 September 1920)
- Grand Cordon of the Order of the Chrysanthemum (24 August 1923; posthumous)
- Viscount (24 August 1923; posthumous)

== Notes ==
Military offices
Fleet created	2nd Fleet; Chief-of-staff; 28 December 1903 - 12 January 1905	Succeeded by Kōichi Fujii
Preceded by Shimamura Hayao	Combined Fleet & 1st Fleet; Chief-of-staff; 12 January 1905 - 20 December 1905	Combined Fleet; Fleet dissolved; post next held by: Yamashita Gentarō
Preceded by Shimamura Hayao	Combined Fleet & 1st Fleet; Chief-of-staff; 12 January 1905 - 20 December 1905	1st Fleet; Kōichi Fujii
Political offices
Preceded by Saitō Makoto	Vice-Minister of the Navy; 8 January 1906 – 1 December 1909	Succeeded by Takarabe Takeshi
Military offices
Preceded by Yamanouchi Masuji	Kure Naval District; Commander-in-chief; 1 December 1909 - 1 December 1913	Succeeded by Matsumoto Kazu
Preceded by Dewa Shigetō	1st Fleet; Commander-in-chief; 1 December 1913 – 10 August 1915	Succeeded by Kōichi Fujii
Political offices
Preceded by Yashiro Rokurō	Minister of the Navy; 8 October 1915 – 15 May 1923	Succeeded by Takarabe Takeshi
Preceded by Takahashi Korekiyo	Prime Minister; 16 June 1922 – 24 August 1923	Succeeded by Yamamoto Gonnohyōe
