= Ministry of the Navy (Japan) =

Former Japanese government ministry (1872–1945)

- 海軍省; Kaigun-shō
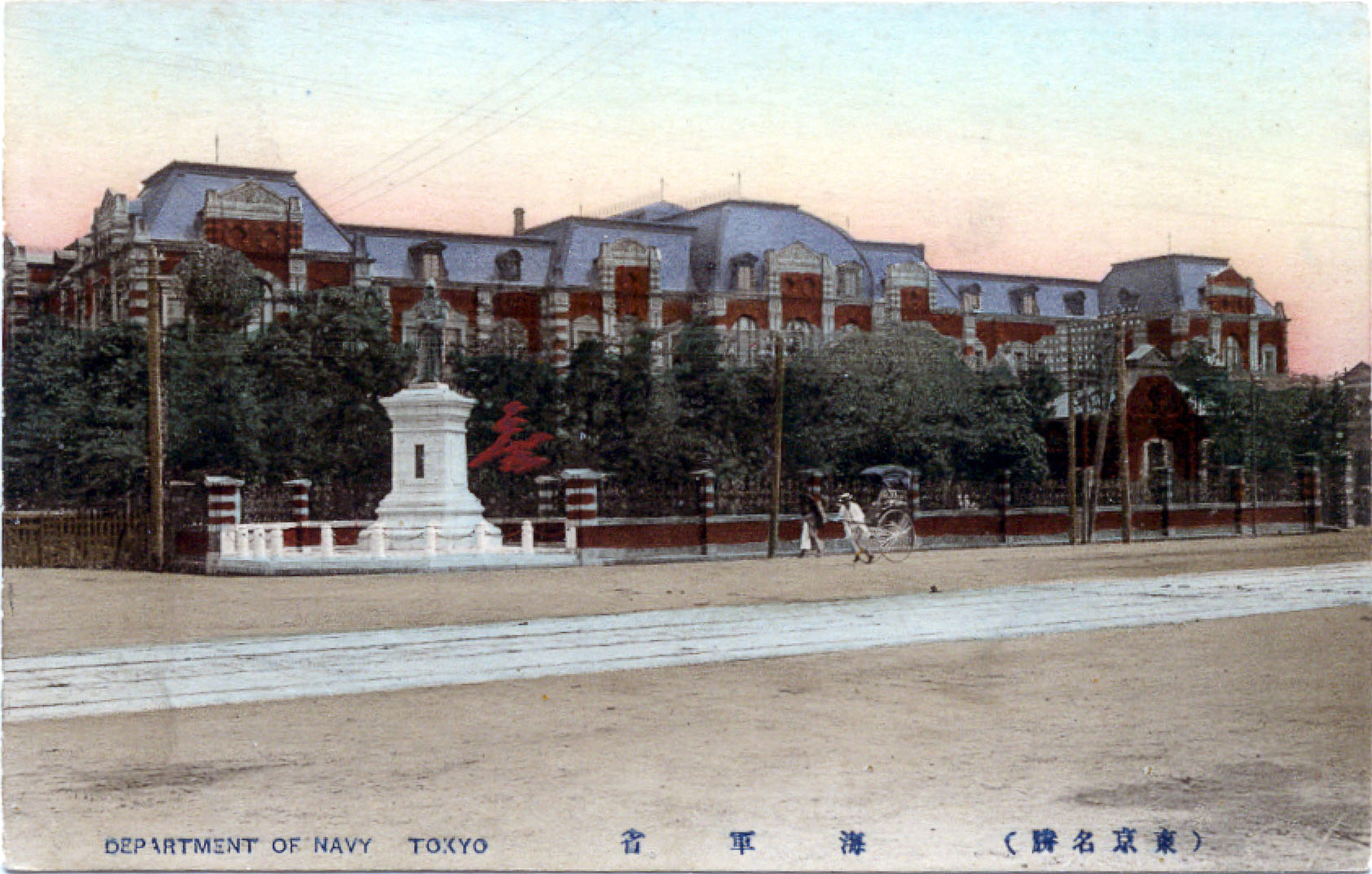
- Navy Ministry building, Chiyoda, Tokyo, c. 1890

Agency overview
- Formed: April 1872
- Preceding agency: Ministry of War
- Dissolved: November 1945
- Superseding agency: Ministry of Defense
- Jurisdiction: Imperial Japanese Navy

The Ministry of the Navy (海軍省, Kaigun-shō) was a cabinet-level ministry in the Empire of Japan charged with the administrative affairs of the Imperial Japanese Navy (IJN). It existed from 1872 to 1945.

In the IJN and the Imperial Japanese Army (IJA), the ministries were in charge of Gunsei (軍政, military administration), and Navy General Staff and Army General Staff Office were in charge of Gunrei (軍令, military command). The two were distinguished.

== History ==
The Navy Ministry was created in April 1872, along with the Army Ministry, to replace the Ministry of War (兵部省, Hyōbushō) of the early Meiji government.

Initially, the Navy Ministry was in charge of both administration and operational command of the Imperial Japanese Navy. However, with the creation of the Imperial Japanese Navy General Staff in May 1893, it was left with only administrative functions.

"The ministry was responsible for the naval budget, ship construction, weapons procurement, personnel, relations with the Diet and the cabinet and broad matters of naval policy. The General Staff directed the operations of the fleet and the preparation of war plans". The post of Navy Minister was politically powerful. Although a member of the Cabinet after the establishment of the cabinet system of government in 1885, the Navy Minister was answerable directly to the Emperor (the commander-in-chief of the Imperial Japanese Armed Forces under the Meiji Constitution) and not the Prime Minister.

Up until the 1920s, the Navy Ministry held the upper hand over the Navy General Staff in terms of political influence. However, the officers of the Navy General Staff found an opportunity at the Washington Naval Conference in 1921–22 to improve their situation. At this meeting, the United States and Britain wanted to establish a worldwide naval ratio, asking the Japanese to limit themselves to a smaller navy than the Western powers. The Naval Ministry was willing to agree to this, seeking to maintain the Anglo-Japanese Alliance, but the Navy General Staff refused. The Imperial Japanese Navy became divided into mutually hostile Fleet Faction and Treaty Faction political cliques. Ultimately, the treaty was signed by Japan, but terminated in 1934. Through the 1930s, with increasing Japanese militarism, the Fleet Faction gradually gained ascendancy over the Treaty Faction and came to dominate the Navy General Staff, which pushed through the attack on Pearl Harbor against the resistance of the Navy Ministry.

After 1937, both the Navy Minister and the Chief of the Navy General Staff were members of the Imperial General Headquarters.

With the defeat of the Empire of Japan in World War II, the Navy Ministry was abolished together with the Imperial Japanese Navy by the American occupation authorities in November 1945 and was not revived in the post-war Constitution of Japan.

== Organization ==
=== Internally operating divisions ===
- Military Affairs Bureau
- Mobilization Bureau
- Technical Bureau
- Personnel Bureau
- Training Bureau
- Medical Bureau
- Shipyard Bureau
- Naval Construction Bureau
- Legal Bureau
- Administrative/Accounting Bureau

=== Externally operating divisions ===
- Navy Aviation Bureau
- Naval Academy
- Naval War College
- Naval Accounting School
- Navy Medical School
- Naval Engineering School
- Submarine Division
- Canals and Waterways Division
- Naval Technical Department
- Naval Tribunal
- Tokyo Naval Tribunal
- Chemical Warfare Division
- Radio and Radar Division
- Supply and Transport Bureau
- Naval Construction Division
- Naval Maintenance & Repair Division
- Special Attack Weapons Division
- Emergency Reaction Division
- Naval Aviation Training Division
- Naval Intelligence Division

== Ministers of the Navy of Japan ==
Flag for the Minister of the Navy

By law, Navy Ministers had to be appointed from active duty admirals or vice-admirals.

=== Naval Lords under the Ministry of War ===
- Katsu Kaishū
- Kawamura Sumiyoshi
- Enomoto Takeaki (28 February 1880 – 7 April 1881)
- Nakamuta Kuranosuke
- Kabayama Sukenori

=== Naval Ministers under the Meiji Constitution ===
No.	Portrait	Name	Term of Office		Cabinet
1		Saigō Jūdō 西郷 従道	22 December 1885	17 May 1890	1st Itō
1		Saigō Jūdō 西郷 従道	22 December 1885	17 May 1890	Kuroda
1		Saigō Jūdō 西郷 従道	22 December 1885	17 May 1890	1st Yamagata
2		Kabayama Sukenori 樺山 資紀	17 May 1890	8 August 1892	1st Yamagata
2		Kabayama Sukenori 樺山 資紀	17 May 1890	8 August 1892	1st Matsukata
3		Nire Kagenori 仁礼 景範	8 August 1892	11 March 1893	2nd Itō
4		Saigō Jūdō 西郷 従道	11 March 1893	8 November 1898	2nd Itō
4		Saigō Jūdō 西郷 従道	11 March 1893	8 November 1898	2nd Matsukata
4		Saigō Jūdō 西郷 従道	11 March 1893	8 November 1898	3rd Itō
4		Saigō Jūdō 西郷 従道	11 March 1893	8 November 1898	1st Ōkuma
5		Yamamoto Gonnohyōe 山本 權兵衞	8 November 1898	7 January 1906	2nd Yamagata
5		Yamamoto Gonnohyōe 山本 權兵衞	8 November 1898	7 January 1906	4th Itō
5		Yamamoto Gonnohyōe 山本 權兵衞	8 November 1898	7 January 1906	1st Katsura
6		Saitō Makoto 斎藤 実	7 January 1906	16 April 1914	1st Saionji
6		Saitō Makoto 斎藤 実	7 January 1906	16 April 1914	2nd Katsura
6		Saitō Makoto 斎藤 実	7 January 1906	16 April 1914	2nd Saionji
6		Saitō Makoto 斎藤 実	7 January 1906	16 April 1914	3rd Katsura
6		Saitō Makoto 斎藤 実	7 January 1906	16 April 1914	1st Yamamoto
7		Yashiro Rokurō 八代 六郎	16 April 1914	10 August 1915	2nd Ōkuma
8		Katō Tomosaburō 加藤 友三郎	10 August 1915	15 May 1923	2nd Ōkuma
8		Katō Tomosaburō 加藤 友三郎	10 August 1915	15 May 1923	Terauchi
8		Katō Tomosaburō 加藤 友三郎	10 August 1915	15 May 1923	Hara
8		Katō Tomosaburō 加藤 友三郎	10 August 1915	15 May 1923	Takahashi
8		Katō Tomosaburō 加藤 友三郎	10 August 1915	15 May 1923	Katō
9		Takarabe Takeshi 財部 彪	15 May 1923	7 January 1924	Katō
9		Takarabe Takeshi 財部 彪	15 May 1923	7 January 1924	2nd Yamamoto
10		Murakami Kakuichi 村上 格一	7 January 1924	11 June 1924	Kiyoura
11		Takarabe Takeshi 財部 彪	11 June 1924	20 April 1927	Katō
11		Takarabe Takeshi 財部 彪	11 June 1924	20 April 1927	1st Wakatsuki
12		Keisuke Okada 岡田 啓介	20 April 1927	2 July 1929	1st Tanaka
13		Takarabe Takeshi 財部 彪	2 July 1929	3 October 1930	Hamaguchi
14		Kiyokazu Abo 安保 清種	3 October 1930	13 December 1931	Hamaguchi
14		Kiyokazu Abo 安保 清種	3 October 1930	13 December 1931	2nd Wakatsuki
15		Mineo Ōsumi 大角 岑生	13 December 1931	26 May 1932	Inukai
16		Keisuke Okada 岡田 啓介	26 May 1932	9 January 1933	Saitō
17		Mineo Ōsumi 大角 岑生	9 January 1933	9 March 1936	Saitō
17		Mineo Ōsumi 大角 岑生	9 January 1933	9 March 1936	Okada
18		Osami Nagano 永野 修身	9 March 1936	2 February 1937	Hirota
19		Mitsumasa Yonai 米内 光政	2 February 1937	30 August 1939	Hayashi
19		Mitsumasa Yonai 米内 光政	2 February 1937	30 August 1939	1st Konoe
19		Mitsumasa Yonai 米内 光政	2 February 1937	30 August 1939	1st Hiranuma
20		Zengo Yoshida 吉田 善吾	30 August 1939	5 September 1940	Abe
20		Zengo Yoshida 吉田 善吾	30 August 1939	5 September 1940	Yonai
20		Zengo Yoshida 吉田 善吾	30 August 1939	5 September 1940	2nd Konoe
21		Koshirō Oikawa 及川 古志郎	5 September 1940	18 October 1941	2nd Konoe
21		Koshirō Oikawa 及川 古志郎	5 September 1940	18 October 1941	3rd Konoe
22		Shigetarō Shimada 嶋田 繁太郎	18 October 1941	17 July 1944	Tojo
23		Naokuni Nomura 野村 直邦	17 July 1944	22 July 1944	Tojo
24		Mitsumasa Yonai 米内 光政	22 July 1944	1 December 1945	Koiso
24		Mitsumasa Yonai 米内 光政	22 July 1944	1 December 1945	Suzuki
24		Mitsumasa Yonai 米内 光政	22 July 1944	1 December 1945	Higashikuni
24		Mitsumasa Yonai 米内 光政	22 July 1944	1 December 1945	Shidehara

== See also ==
- Imperial Japanese Navy General Staff
