= Second Ōkuma cabinet =

Cabinet of Japan (1914–1916)

Second Ōkuma Cabinet
- 17th Cabinet of Japan

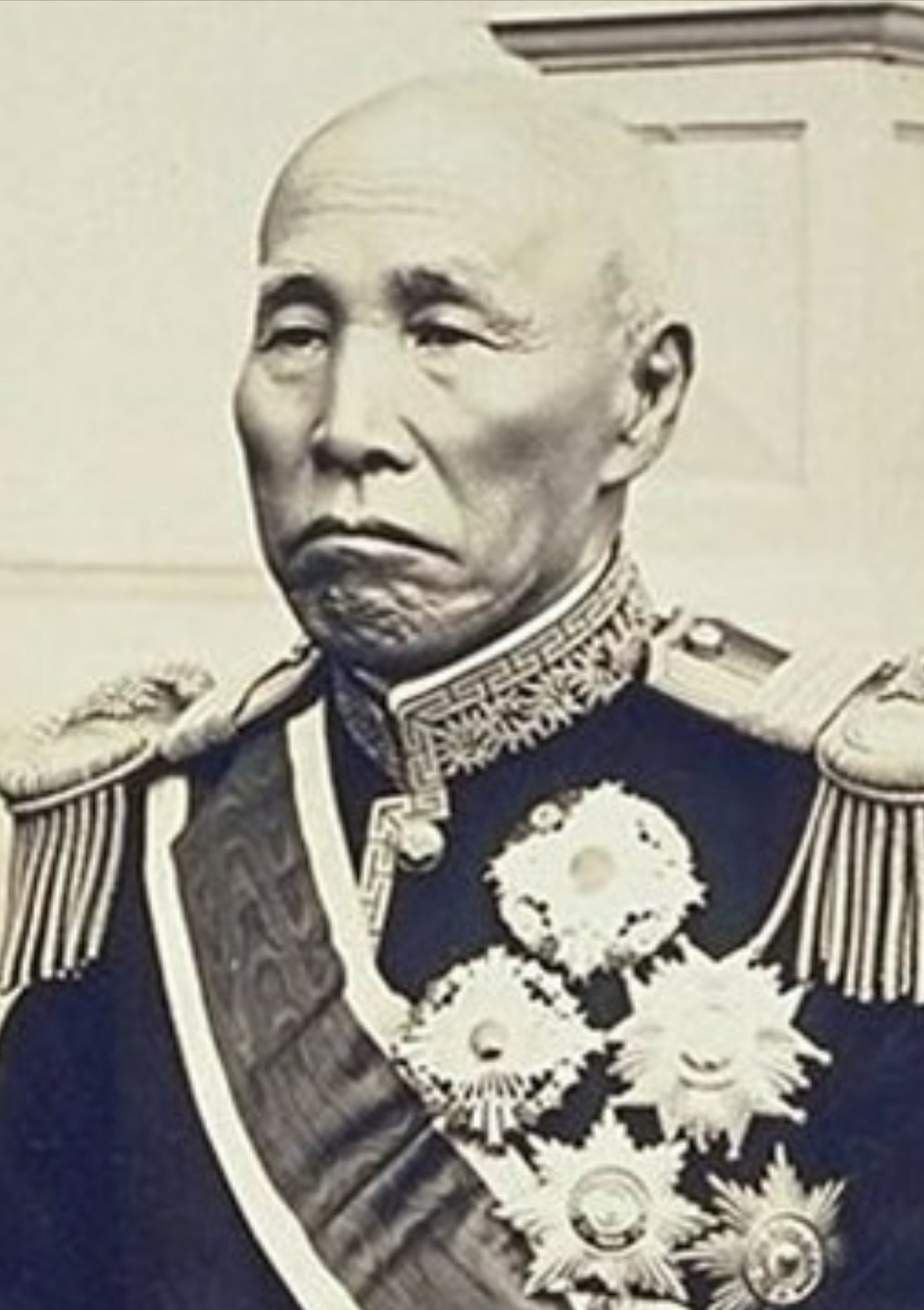
- Prime Minister Ōkuma Shigenobu
- Date formed: April 16, 1914
- Date dissolved: October 9, 1916

People and organisations
- Emperor: Taishō
- Prime Minister: Ōkuma Shigenobu
- Member party: HoR Blocs: Rikken Dōshikai; HoP Blocs: Kōseikai

History
- Election: 1915 general election
- Legislature terms: 32nd Imperial Diet; 33rd Imperial Diet; 34th Imperial Diet; 35th Imperial Diet; 36th Imperial Diet; 37th Imperial Diet
- Predecessor: First Yamamoto Cabinet
- Successor: Terauchi Cabinet

The Second Ōkuma Cabinet is the 17th Cabinet of Japan led by Ōkuma Shigenobu from April 16, 1914, to October 9, 1916.

== Cabinet ==
Ministers
Portfolio	Name	Political party	Term start	Term end
Prime Minister	Marquess Ōkuma Shigenobu	Rikken Dōshikai	April 16, 1914	October 9, 1916
Minister for Foreign Affairs	Baron Katō Takaaki	Rikken Dōshikai	April 16, 1914	August 10, 1915
Minister of Home Affairs	Marquess Ōkuma Shigenobu	Rikken Dōshikai	April 16, 1914	January 7, 1915
Minister of Home Affairs	Viscount Ōura Kanetake	Military (Army)	January 7, 1915	July 30, 1915
Minister of Home Affairs	Marquess Ōkuma Shigenobu	Rikken Dōshikai	July 30, 1915	October 13, 1915
Minister of Finance	Wakatsuki Reijirō	Rikken Dōshikai	April 16, 1914	August 10, 1915
Minister of the Army	Oka Ichinosuke	Military (Army)	April 16, 1914	March 30, 1916
Minister of the Navy	Yashiro Rokurō	Military (Navy)	April 16, 1914	August 10, 1915
Minister of Justice	Yukio Ozaki	Chūseikai	April 16, 1914	October 9, 1916
Minister of Education	Ichiki Kitokurō	Independent	April 16, 1914	August 10, 1915
Minister of Agriculture and Commerce	Viscount Ōura Kanetake	Military (Army)	April 16, 1914	January 7, 1915
Minister of Agriculture and Commerce	Kōno Hironaka	Rikken Dōshikai	January 7, 1915	October 9, 1916
Minister of Communications	Taketomi Tokitoshi	Rikken Dōshikai	April 16, 1914	August 10, 1915
Chief Cabinet Secretary	Egi Tasuku	Independent	April 16, 1914	October 9, 1916
Director-General of the Cabinet Legislation Bureau	Kuratomi Yūzaburō	Independent	April 16, 1914	April 25, 1914
Director-General of the Cabinet Legislation Bureau	Sakuye Takahashi	Independent	April 25, 1914	October 9, 1916
Parliamentary Undersecretaries
Portfolio	Name	Political party	Term start	Term end
Parliamentary Undersecretary for Foreign Affairs	Adachi Kenzō	Rikken Dōshikai	July 2, 1915	August 12, 1915
Parliamentary Undersecretary of Home Affairs	Shimooka Chuji	Independent	July 2, 1915	August 12, 1915
Parliamentary Undersecretary of Finance	Hamaguchi Osachi	Rikken Dōshikai	July 2, 1915	August 12, 1915
Parliamentary Undersecretary of the Army	Baron Manabe Akira	Military (Army)	July 2, 1915	October 9, 1916
Parliamentary Undersecretary of the Navy	Hayami Seiji	Independent	July 2, 1915	August 21, 1915
Parliamentary Undersecretary of Justice	Daikichirō Tagawa	Chūseikai	July 2, 1915	October 9, 1916
Parliamentary Undersecretary of Education	Kuwata Kumazo	Independent	July 2, 1915	August 21, 1915
Parliamentary Undersecretary of Agriculture and Commerce	Machida Chūji	Rikken Dōshikai	July 2, 1915	October 9, 1916
Parliamentary Undersecretary of Communications	Fujisawa Ikunosuke	Rikken Dōshikai	July 2, 1915	August 21, 1915
Deputy Parliamentary Undersecretaries
Portfolio	Name	Political party	Term start	Term end
Deputy Parliamentary Undersecretary for Foreign Affairs	Suzuoki Kurajirō	Rikken Dōshikai	July 2, 1915	August 12, 1915
Deputy Parliamentary Undersecretary of Home Affairs	Torii Teijiro	Rikken Dōshikai	July 2, 1915	October 9, 1916
Deputy Parliamentary Undersecretary of Finance	Ōtsu Junichirō	Rikken Dōshikai	July 2, 1915	August 21, 1915
Deputy Parliamentary Undersecretary of the Army	Miura Tokuichirō	Rikken Dōshikai	July 2, 1915	October 9, 1916
Deputy Parliamentary Undersecretary of the Navy	Tanaka Zenryū	Rikken Dōshikai	July 2, 1915	October 9, 1916
Deputy Parliamentary Undersecretary of Justice	Seki Wachi	Rikken Dōshikai	July 2, 1915	October 9, 1916
Deputy Parliamentary Undersecretary of Education	Ōkuma Nobutsune	Independent	July 2, 1915	October 30, 1915
Deputy Parliamentary Undersecretary of Agriculture and Commerce	Baron Tsuboi Kuhachiro	Independent	July 2, 1915	October 9, 1916
Deputy Parliamentary Undersecretary of Communications	Arakawa Gorō	Rikken Dōshikai	July 2, 1915	October 9, 1916

== Reshuffled Cabinet ==
A Cabinet reshuffle took place on August 10, 1915.

Ministers
Portfolio	Minister	Political party	Term start	Term end
Prime Minister	Marquess Ōkuma Shigenobu	Rikken Dōshikai	April 16, 1914	October 9, 1916
Minister for Foreign Affairs	Marquess Ōkuma Shigenobu	Rikken Dōshikai	August 10, 1915	October 13, 1915
Minister for Foreign Affairs	Baron Ishii Kikujirō	Independent	October 13, 1915	October 9, 1916
Minister of Home Affairs	Ichiki Kitokurō	Independent	August 10, 1915	October 9, 1916
Minister of Finance	Taketomi Tokitoshi	Rikken Dōshikai	August 10, 1915	October 9, 1916
Minister of the Army	Oka Ichinosuke	Military (Army)	April 16, 1914	March 30, 1916
Minister of the Army	Ōshima Ken'ichi	Military (Army)	March 30, 1916	October 9, 1916
Minister of the Navy	Katō Tomosaburō	Military (Navy)	August 10, 1915	October 9, 1916
Minister of Justice	Yukio Ozaki	Chūseikai	April 16, 1914	October 9, 1916
Minister of Education	Takada Sanae	Independent	August 10, 1915	October 9, 1916
Minister of Agriculture and Commerce	Kōno Hironaka	Rikken Dōshikai	January 7, 1915	October 9, 1916
Minister of Communications	Minoura Katsundo	Rikken Dōshikai	August 10, 1915	October 9, 1916
Chief Cabinet Secretary	Egi Tasuku	Independent	April 16, 1914	October 9, 1916
Director-General of the Cabinet Legislation Bureau	Sakuye Takahashi	Independent	April 25, 1914	October 9, 1916
Parliamentary Undersecretaries
Portfolio	Name	Political party	Term start	Term end
Parliamentary Undersecretary for Foreign Affairs	Adachi Kenzō	Rikken Dōshikai	July 2, 1915	August 12, 1915
Parliamentary Undersecretary for Foreign Affairs	Vacant		August 12, 1915	October 30, 1915
Parliamentary Undersecretary for Foreign Affairs	Tokai Sanshi	Rikken Dōshikai	October 30, 1915	October 9, 1916
Parliamentary Undersecretary of Home Affairs	Shimooka Chuji	Independent	July 2, 1915	August 12, 1915
Parliamentary Undersecretary of Home Affairs	Vacant		August 12, 1915	August 21, 1915
Parliamentary Undersecretary of Home Affairs	Fujisawa Ikunosuke	Rikken Dōshikai	August 21, 1915	October 9, 1916
Parliamentary Undersecretary of Finance	Hamaguchi Osachi	Rikken Dōshikai	July 2, 1915	August 12, 1915
Parliamentary Undersecretary of Finance	Vacant		August 12, 1915	August 21, 1915
Parliamentary Undersecretary of Finance	Katō Masanosuke	Chūseikai	August 21, 1915	October 9, 1916
Parliamentary Undersecretary of the Army	Baron Manabe Akira	Military (Army)	July 2, 1915	October 9, 1916
Parliamentary Undersecretary of the Navy	Hayami Seiji	Independent	July 2, 1915	December 26, 1915
Parliamentary Undersecretary of the Navy	Vacant		December 26, 1915	January 19, 1916
Parliamentary Undersecretary of the Navy	Jiro Okabe	Chūseikai	January 19, 1916	October 9, 1916
Parliamentary Undersecretary of Justice	Daikichirō Tagawa	Chūseikai	July 2, 1915	October 9, 1916
Parliamentary Undersecretary of Education	Kuwata Kumazo	Independent	July 2, 1915	August 21, 1915
Parliamentary Undersecretary of Education	Ōtsu Junichirō	Rikken Dōshikai	August 21, 1915	October 9, 1916
Parliamentary Undersecretary of Agriculture and Commerce	Machida Chūji	Rikken Dōshikai	July 2, 1915	October 9, 1916
Parliamentary Undersecretary of Communications	Fujisawa Ikunosuke	Rikken Dōshikai	July 2, 1915	August 21, 1915
Parliamentary Undersecretary of Communications	Kinoshita Kenjiro	Rikken Dōshikai	August 21, 1915	October 9, 1916
Deputy Parliamentary Undersecretaries
Portfolio	Name	Political party	Term start	Term end
Deputy Parliamentary Undersecretary for Foreign Affairs	Suzuoki Kurajirō	Rikken Dōshikai	July 2, 1915	August 12, 1915
Deputy Parliamentary Undersecretary for Foreign Affairs	Vacant		August 12, 1915	October 30, 1915
Deputy Parliamentary Undersecretary for Foreign Affairs	Ōkuma Nobutsune	Independent	October 30, 1915	October 9, 1916
Deputy Parliamentary Undersecretary of Home Affairs	Torii Teijiro	Rikken Dōshikai	July 2, 1915	October 9, 1916
Deputy Parliamentary Undersecretary of Finance	Ōtsu Junichirō	Rikken Dōshikai	July 2, 1915	August 21, 1915
Deputy Parliamentary Undersecretary of Finance	Murayasu Shinkuro	Independent	August 21, 1915	October 9, 1916
Deputy Parliamentary Undersecretary of the Army	Miura Tokuichirō	Rikken Dōshikai	July 2, 1915	October 9, 1916
Deputy Parliamentary Undersecretary of the Navy	Tanaka Zenryū	Rikken Dōshikai	July 2, 1915	October 9, 1916
Deputy Parliamentary Undersecretary of Justice	Seki Wachi	Rikken Dōshikai	July 2, 1915	October 9, 1916
Deputy Parliamentary Undersecretary of Education	Ōkuma Nobutsune	Independent	July 2, 1915	October 30, 1915
Deputy Parliamentary Undersecretary of Education	Koyama Tanizō	Chūseikai	October 30, 1915	October 9, 1916
Deputy Parliamentary Undersecretary of Agriculture and Commerce	Baron Tsuboi Kuhachiro	Independent	July 2, 1915	October 9, 1916
Deputy Parliamentary Undersecretary of Communications	Arakawa Gorō	Rikken Dōshikai	July 2, 1915	October 9, 1916
