= Terauchi cabinet =

Cabinet of Japan (1916–1918)

Terauchi Cabinet
- 18th Cabinet of Japan

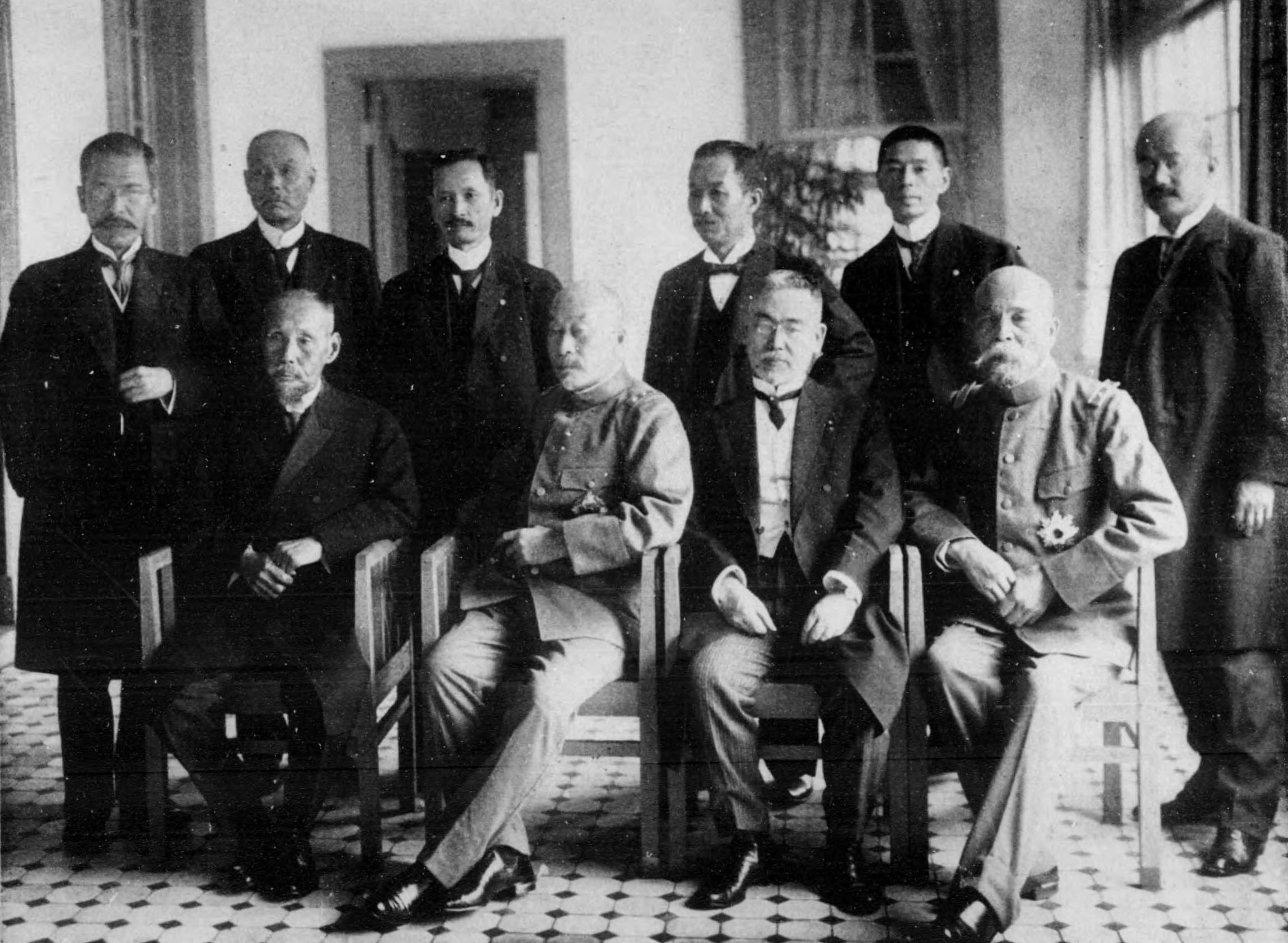
- Date formed: October 9, 1916
- Date dissolved: September 29, 1918

People and organisations
- Emperor: Taishō
- Prime Minister: Terauchi Masatake
- Member party: HoP Blocs: Rikken Seiyūkai; Kenkyūkai; Sawakai

History
- Election: 1917 general election
- Legislature terms: 38th Imperial Diet; 39th Imperial Diet; 40th Imperial Diet
- Predecessor: Second Ōkuma Cabinet
- Successor: Hara Cabinet

The Terauchi Cabinet is the 18th Cabinet of Japan led by Terauchi Masatake from October 9, 1916, to September 29, 1918.

== Cabinet ==
Portfolio	Minister	Political party	Term start	Term end
Prime Minister	Count Terauchi Masatake	Military (Army)	October 9, 1916	September 29, 1918
Minister for Foreign Affairs	Count Terauchi Masatake (acting)	Military (Army)	October 9, 1916	November 21, 1916
Minister for Foreign Affairs	Viscount Motono Ichirō	Independent	November 21, 1916	April 23, 1918
Minister for Foreign Affairs	Baron Gotō Shinpei	Sawakai	April 23, 1918	September 29, 1918
Minister of Home Affairs	Baron Gotō Shinpei	Sawakai	October 9, 1916	April 23, 1918
Minister of Home Affairs	Mizuno Rentarō	Rikken Seiyūkai	April 23, 1918	September 29, 1918
Minister of Finance	Count Terauchi Masatake	Military (Army)	October 9, 1916	December 16, 1916
Minister of Finance	Kazue Shoda	Independent	December 16, 1916	September 29, 1918
Minister of the Army	Ōshima Ken'ichi	Military (Army)	October 9, 1916	September 29, 1918
Minister of the Navy	Viscount Katō Tomosaburō	Military (Navy)	October 9, 1916	September 29, 1918
Minister of Justice	Matsumuro Itaru	Independent	October 9, 1916	September 29, 1918
Minister of Education	Viscount Okada Ryōhei	Kenkyūkai	October 9, 1916	September 29, 1918
Minister of Agriculture and Commerce	Nakashōji Ren	Independent	October 9, 1916	September 29, 1918
Minister of Communications	Baron Den Kenjirō	Independent	October 9, 1916	September 29, 1918
Chief Cabinet Secretary	Count Hideo Kodama	Independent	October 9, 1916	September 29, 1918
Director-General of the Cabinet Legislation Bureau	Arimatsu Hideyoshi	Kenkyūkai	October 9, 1916	September 29, 1918
