= Motoda Hajime =

Japanese politician

Senior Second Rank Motoda Hajime
- 元田 肇
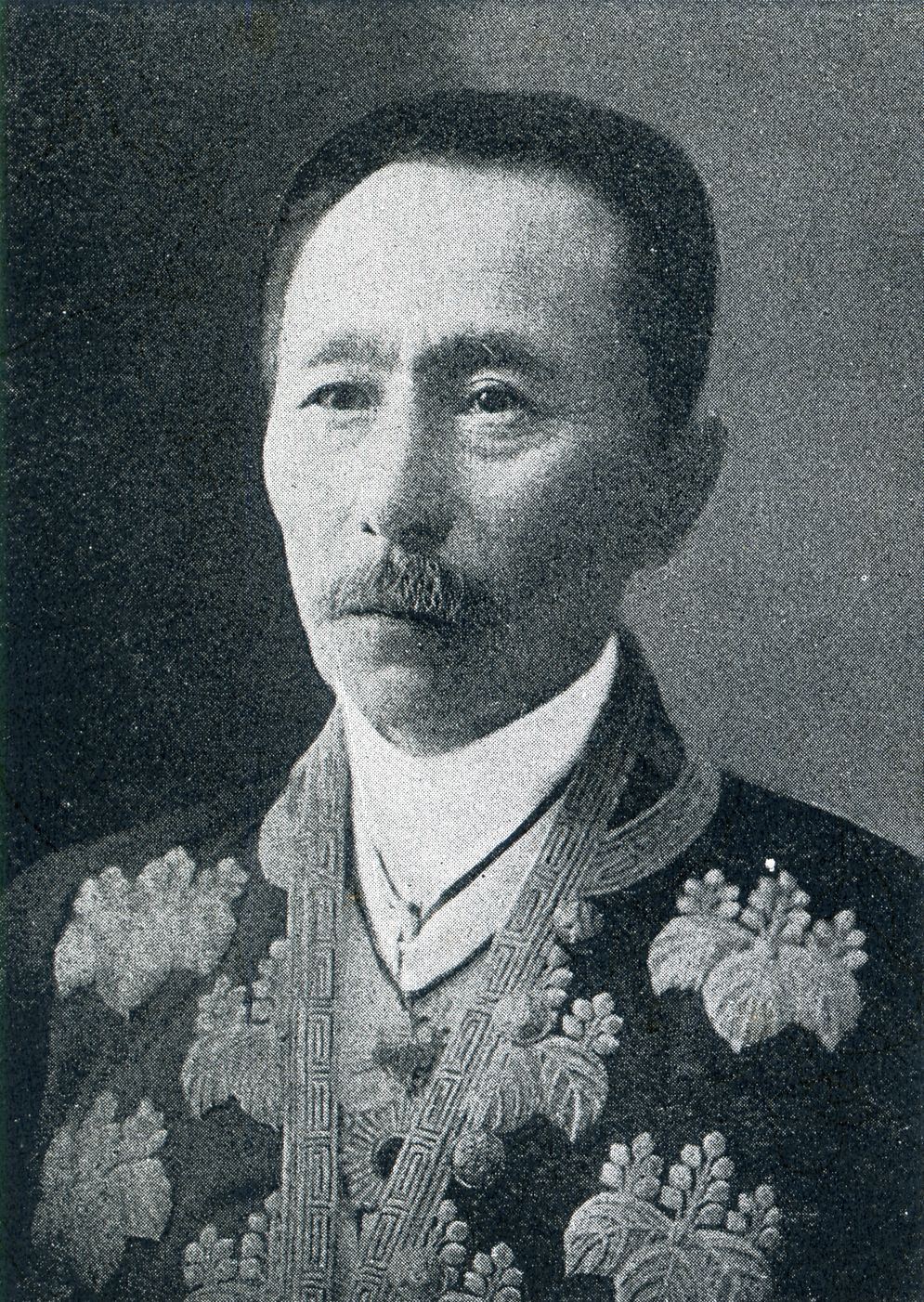
- Motoda in 1932

Speaker of the House of Representatives
- In office 20 April 1928 – 14 March 1929
- Monarch: Hirohito
- Deputy: Ichirō Kiyose
- Preceded by: Shigeru Morita
- Succeeded by: Kawahara Mosuke

Minister of Railways
- In office 15 May 1920 – 12 June 1922
- Prime Minister: Hara Takashi; Takahashi Korekiyo
- Preceded by: Office established
- Succeeded by: Enkichi Ōki

Minister of Communications
- In office 20 February 1913 – 16 April 1914
- Prime Minister: Yamamoto Gonnohyōe
- Preceded by: Gotō Shinpei
- Succeeded by: Taketomi Tokitoshi

Vice Speaker of the House of Representatives
- In office 18 May 1898 – 28 December 1902
- Speaker: Kenkichi Kataoka
- Preceded by: Shimada Saburō
- Succeeded by: Teiichi Sugita

Member of the Privy Council
- In office 27 January 1932 – 1 October 1938
- Monarch: Hirohito

Member of the House of Representatives
- In office 15 April 1892 – 21 January 1930
- Preceded by: Koretsune Makaji
- Succeeded by: Kin'ya Takahashi
- Constituency: Ōita 6th (1892–1894); Ōita 5th (1894–1902); Ōita Prefecture (1902–1920); Ōita 6th (1920–1928); Ōita 2nd (1928–1930)
- In office 2 July 1890 – 25 December 1891
- Preceded by: Constituency established
- Succeeded by: Yoshihiko Ono
- Constituency: Ōita 1st

Member of the Tokyo City Council
- In office February 1896 – June 1899

Personal details
- Born: 28 February 1858 Kunisaki, Bungo, Japan
- Died: 1 October 1938 (aged 80) Kōjimachi, Tokyo, Japan
- Party: Rikken Seiyūkai
- Other political affiliations: Taiseikai (1890–1891); Kokumin Kyōkai (1892–1899); Teikokutō (1899–1905); Seiyūhontō (1924–1927)
- Relatives: Funada Naka (son-in-law)
- Education: Tokyo Imperial University

Motoda Hajime (元田 肇; 28 February 1858 – 1 October 1938) was a Japanese politician and cabinet minister in the Meiji, Taishō and early Shōwa periods of the Japan.

== Biography ==
Motoda was born in Bungo Province in what is now part of Kunisaki, Ōita, where his father, Inomata Eizo was a doctor. He was adopted by Motoda Naoshi, a samurai in the service of Kitsuki Domain on his marriage to Motoda’s daughter. Following the Meiji Restoration, he went to Tokyo, and graduated from Tokyo Imperial University with a legal degree in 1880. In the first Japanese general election of 1890, Motoda was elected to the lower house of the Diet of Japan. He was reelected 16 times, mostly under the Rikken Seiyūkai party, serving for over 40 years, including three terms as Vice-Speaker of the House from 1889-1892.

Under the administration of Prime Minister Yamamoto Gonnohyōe (1913–1914), Motoda was appointed Communications Minister. He subsequently served as the first Railroad Minister, when that cabinet-level post was created under the Hara Takashi administration in May 1920. He continued in the same post under the Takahashi Korekiyo administration until the collapse of that administration in June 1922.

Motoda became Speaker of the House from 20 April 1928 to 14 March 1929. In 1932, he was appointed to the Privy Council, the first party politician to receive this honor. His grave is at the Aoyama Cemetery in Tokyo.

Political offices
Preceded by Gotō Shimpei	Minister of Communications; 20 February 1913 – 16 April 1914	Succeeded by Taketomi Tokitoshi
Preceded by: none -	Railroad Minister; 15 May 1920 – 12 June 1922	Succeeded by Enkichi Ōki
House of Representatives (Japan)
Preceded by Shigeru Morita	Speaker of the House of Representatives; 20 April 1928 – 14 March 1929	Succeeded by Mosuke Kawahara
