= Ishii Kikujirō =

Japanese politician

Viscount Ishii Kikujirō
- 石井 菊次郎
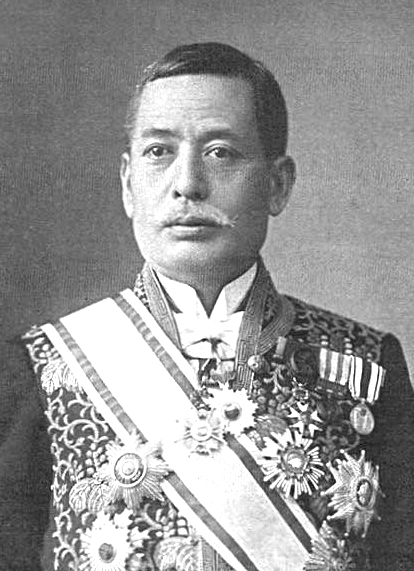
- Ishii in 1918

Minister for Foreign Affairs
- In office 13 October 1915 – 9 October 1916
- Prime Minister: Ōkuma Shigenobu
- Preceded by: Ōkuma Shigenobu
- Succeeded by: Terauchi Masatake

Member of the Privy Council
- In office 14 February 1929 – 25 May 1945
- Monarch: Hirohito

Member of the House of Peers
- In office 5 October 1916 – 19 February 1929 Nominated by the Emperor

Personal details
- Born: 24 April 1866 Mobara, Kazusa, Japan
- Died: 25 May 1945 (aged 79) Tokyo, Japan
- Cause of death: Air strike
- Party: Independent
- Education: Tokyo Imperial University
- Occupation: Diplomat, Cabinet Minister

Viscount Ishii Kikujirō (石井 菊次郎; 24 April 1866 – 25 May 1945), was a Japanese diplomat and cabinet minister in Meiji, Taishō and early Shōwa period Japan. He served as Minister for Foreign Affairs of the Empire of Japan between 1915 and 1916.

== Biography ==
Ishii was born in Mobara city, Kazusa Province (present-day Chiba Prefecture). He graduated from the Law Department of Tokyo Imperial University and joined the Foreign Ministry. His first posting was as an attaché to Paris in 1891, and he was later sent to Chemulpo, Korea in 1896 and to Beijing, China in 1897. During the Boxer Rebellion he served as Japanese diplomatic liaison with the various foreign interventionist armies, spending six months on the front with the Imperial Japanese Army's 5th Infantry Division.

Ishii was appointed Vice Minister for Foreign Affairs under the First and Second Katsura Cabinets from 1908 to 1912, and was created a baron (danshaku) in the kazoku (peerage) on 24 August 1911; he had previously been appointed a Grand Cordon of the Order of the Sacred Treasure on 13 June. After a term as Japanese ambassador to France from 1912 to 1915, he became Minister for Foreign Affairs under the Second Ōkuma Cabinet from 1915 to 1916, playing a major role in the normalization of relations between Japan and Russia.

In 1916, Ishii was raised to viscount (shishaku), and was appointed to a seat in the House of Peers of the Diet of Japan.

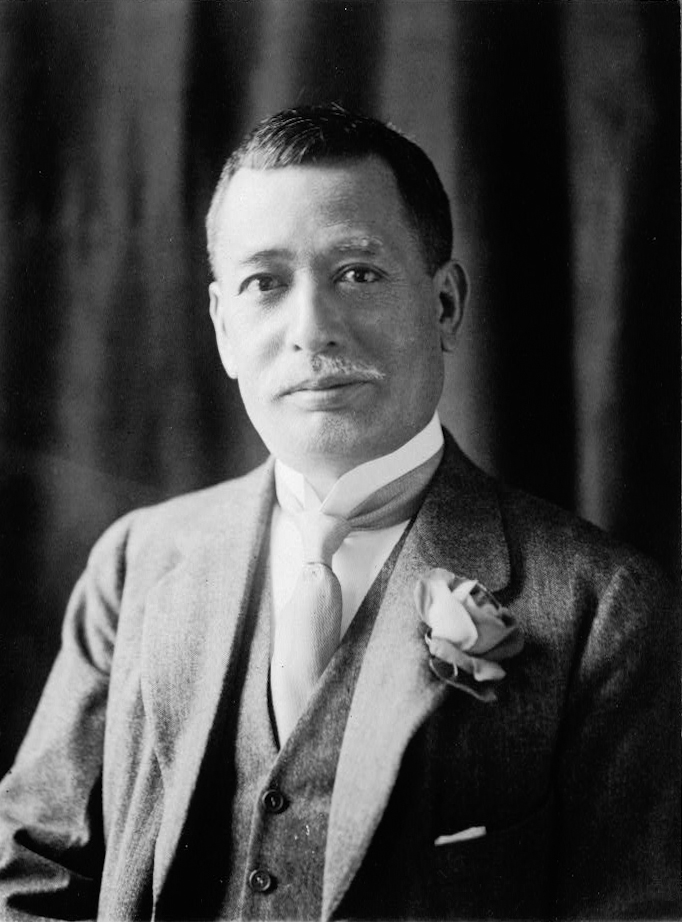
Ishii Kikujiro, 1918

Ishii is remembered for his efforts to improve Japan–United States relations during a period of increasing tension over China, and the racist treatment of Japanese living in the United States. His approach reflected his strong belief that good relations between the United States and Japan were essential for Japan's future economic and political growth. As special envoy to the United States from 1917 to 1918, he negotiated the Lansing–Ishii Agreement, which was intended to defuse tension between the two nations, but was limited in its effectiveness due to the reluctance of either government to make any concessions. Ishii stayed on in the United States as ambassador from 1918 to 1919, attempting to reduce tensions created by the Siberian Intervention of Japanese forces into the Russian Far East as part of western support for White Russian forces against the Bolsheviks.

Ishii traveled to Europe to take part in the Paris Peace Conference to take the initiative at the demarcation of the German–Polish border, and later served as president of the Council and the Assembly of the League of Nations in 1923 and 1926. He was also the leader of the Japanese delegation at the Geneva Naval Conference.

After his return to Japan, Ishii served as a member of the Privy Council from 1925 to 1945 in which he was highly outspoken in his strong opposition to the Tripartite Pact between Japan, Nazi Germany and fascist Italy.

During the third firebombing of Tokyo on 25 May 1945, Ishii was last seen heading towards Meiji Shrine, which was the designated safe refuge for his neighborhood association during the bombing. He never arrived, and he was presumed killed. His body was never found.

Political offices
Preceded by Ōkuma Shigenobu	Minister for Foreign Affairs; 1915–1916	Succeeded by Terauchi Masatake
Preceded by Chinda Sutemi	Vice Minister for Foreign Affairs; 1908–1912	Succeeded by Kurachi Tetsukichi
Diplomatic posts
Preceded by Matsui Keishirō	Japanese Ambassador to France; 1920–1927	Succeeded by Mineichirō Adachi
Preceded by Aimaro Satō	Japanese Ambassador to the United States; 1918–1919	Succeeded by Shidehara Kijūrō
Preceded by Kurino Shin'ichirō	Japanese Ambassador to France; 1912–1915	Succeeded by Matsui Keishirō
