= Dōshikai =

Dōshikai may refer to:

- Dōshikai (1960–62), a defunct political party in Japan
- Ekirakukai, a defunct political party in Japan originally known as Dōshikai
- Rikken Dōshikai, a defunct political party in Japan
