= List of ambassadors of Japan to France =

The List of Japanese ambassadors to France started when Sameshima Naonobu presented his credentials to the French government in 1870.

== List ==
This is a chronological list of Japanese diplomats.

Inaugural date	Official position (Japanese)	Official position	Name (Japanese)	Name
October 3, 1870	少弁務使	Chargé d'affaires	鮫島 尚信	Sameshima Naonobu
May 3, 1872	中弁務使	Minister resident	鮫島 尚信	Sameshima Naonobu
October 14, 1872	弁理公使	Minister resident	鮫島 尚信	Sameshima Naonobu
November 22, 1873	特命全権公使	Minister Plenipotentiary	鮫島 尚信	Sameshima Naonobu
April 25, 1874	臨時代理公使	Chargé d'affaires ad interim	中野 健明	Nakano Takeaki
January 12, 1878	特命全権公使	Minister Plenipotentiary	鮫島 尚信	Sameshima Naonobu
December 5, 1880	臨時代理公使	Chargé d'affaires ad interim	鈴木 貫一	Suzuki Kanichi
July 20, 1881	特命全権公使	Minister Plenipotentiary	井田 譲	Ida Yuzuru
March 9, 1883	臨時代理公使	Chargé d'affaires ad interim	光妙寺 三郎	Kōmyōji Saburō
May 20, 1883	特命全権公使	Minister Plenipotentiary	蜂須賀 茂韶	Hachisuka Mochiaki
September 23, 1886	臨時代理公使	Chargé d'affaires ad interim	原 敬	Hara Takashi
June 4, 1887	特命全権公使	Minister Plenipotentiary	田中 不二麿	Tanaka Fujimaro
April 18, 1890	臨時代理公使	Chargé d'affaires ad interim	大山 綱介	Oyama Tsunasuke
August 18, 1891	特命全権公使	Minister Plenipotentiary	野村 靖	Nomura Yasushi
March 18, 1893	臨時代理公使	Chargé d'affaires ad interim	加藤 恒忠	Katō Tsunetada
September 11, 1893	特命全権公使	Minister Plenipotentiary	曾禰 荒助	Sone Arasuke
March 27, 1897	臨時代理公使	Chargé d'affaires ad interim	佐藤 愛麿	Satō Aimaro
June 21, 1897	特命全権公使	Minister Plenipotentiary	栗野 慎一郎	Kurino Shinichirō
February 1, 1900	臨時代理公使	Chargé d'affaires ad interim	秋月 左都夫	Akizuki Satsuo
March 8, 1902	特命全権公使	Minister Plenipotentiary	本野 一郎	Motono Ichirō
March 7, 1906	臨時代理大使	Chargé d'affaires ad interim	田付 七太	Tatsuke Shichita
May 26, 1906	特命全権大使	Ambassador	栗野 慎一郎	Kurino Shinichirō
October 6, 1911	臨時代理大使	Chargé d'affaires ad interim	安達 峰一郎	Adachi Mineichirō
July 7, 1912	特命全権大使	Ambassador	石井 菊次郎	Ishii Kikujirō
September 4, 1915	臨時代理大使	Chargé d'affaires ad interim	田付 七太	Tatsuke Shichita
February 22, 1916	特命全権大使	Ambassador	松井 慶四郎	Matsui Keishirō
September 25, 1920	臨時代理大使	Chargé d'affaires ad interim	長岡 春一	Nagaoka Harukazu
September 30, 1920	特命全権大使	Ambassador	石井 菊次郎	Ishii Kikujirō
October 6, 1922	臨時代理大使	Chargé d'affaires ad interim	松田 道一	Matsuda Michikazu
June 10, 1923	特命全権大使	Ambassador	石井 菊次郎	Ishii Kikujirō
September 2, 1927	臨時代理大使	Chargé d'affaires ad interim	河合 博之	Kawai Hiroyuki
February 18, 1928	特命全権大使	Ambassador	安達 峰一郎	Adachi Mineichirō
February 13, 1930	臨時代理大使	Chargé d'affaires ad interim	河合 博之	Kawai Hiroyuki
June 16, 1930	特命全権大使	Ambassador	芳沢 謙吉	Yoshizawa Kenkichi
December 27, 1931	臨時代理大使	Chargé d'affaires ad interim	栗山 茂	Kuriyama Shigeru
March 18, 1932	特命全権大使	Ambassador	長岡 春一	Nagaoka Harukazu
August 16, 1933	臨時代理大使	Chargé d'affaires ad interim	沢田 廉三	Sawada Renzō
December 20, 1933	特命全権大使	Ambassador	佐藤 尚武	Satō Naotake
July 5, 1934	臨時代理大使	Chargé d'affaires ad interim	三谷 隆信	Mitani Takanobu
December 9, 1934	特命全権大使	Ambassador	佐藤 尚武	Satō Naotake
December 7, 1936	臨時代理大使	Chargé d'affaires ad interim	三谷 隆信	Mitani Takanobu
March 14, 1937	臨時代理大使	Chargé d'affaires ad interim	内山 岩太郎	Uchiyama Iwatarō
July 24, 1937	特命全権大使	Ambassador	杉村 陽太郎	Sugimura Yōtarō
December 14, 1938	臨時代理大使	Chargé d'affaires ad interim	宮崎 勝太郎	Miyazaki Katsutarō
December 17, 1939	特命全権大使	Ambassador	沢田 廉三	Sawada Renzō
September 26, 1940	臨時代理大使	Chargé d'affaires ad interim	原田 健	Harada Ken
May 10, 1941	特命全権大使	Ambassador	加藤 外松	Katō Sotomatsu
February 12, 1942	臨時代理大使	Chargé d'affaires ad interim	原田 健	Harada Ken
April 18, 1942	特命全権大使	Ambassador	三谷 隆信	Mitani Takanobu
		During the summer of 1944, Mitani departed France with the Petain government, which effectively ceased to exist (although Vichy diplomatic and colonial officials remained at post in Japan and Indochina). Free France had declared war on Japan on December 9, 1941. Formal diplomatic relations with the French Republic were restored when the San Francisco Peace Treaty came into effect on April 28, 1952.		
December 16, 1950	在パリ在外事務所長	Chief of the Japanese Government's Overseas Agency in Paris	萩原 徹	Hagiwara Toru
April 28, 1952	臨時代理大使	Chargé d'affaires ad interim	萩原 徹	Hagiwara Toru
June 12, 1952	特命全権大使	Ambassador	西村 熊雄	Nishimura Kumao
December 12, 1956	臨時代理大使	Chargé d'affaires ad interim	松井 明	Matsui Akira
January 24, 1957	特命全権大使	Ambassador	古垣 鉄郎	Furukaki Tetsurō
July 30, 1961	臨時代理大使	Chargé d'affaires ad interim	北原 秀雄	Kitahara Hideo
September 9, 1961	特命全権大使	Ambassador	萩原 徹	Hagiwara Toru
July 18, 1967	臨時代理大使	Chargé d'affaires ad interim	佐藤 正二	Satō Shōji
September 13, 1967	特命全権大使	Ambassador	松井 明	Matsui Akira
July 27, 1970	臨時代理大使	Chargé d'affaires ad interim	松永 信雄	Matsunaga Nobuo
September 18, 1970	特命全権大使	Ambassador	中山 賀博	Nakayama Yoshirō
February 5, 1975	臨時代理大使	Chargé d'affaires ad interim	武藤 利昭	Muto Toshiaki
April 4, 1975	特命全権大使	Ambassador	北原 秀雄	Kitahara Hideo
February 19, 1979	臨時代理大使	Chargé d'affaires ad interim	大嶋 鋭男	Oshima Toshio
March 19, 1979	特命全権大使	Ambassador	井川 克一	Ikawa Katsuichi
January 25, 1982	臨時代理大使	Chargé d'affaires ad interim	西川 健彦	Nishikawa Takehiko
February 9, 1982	特命全権大使	Ambassador	内田 宏	Uchida Hiroshi
December 7, 1984	臨時代理大使	Chargé d'affaires ad interim	苅田 吉夫	Karita Yoshio
December 15, 1984	特命全権大使	Ambassador	本野 盛幸	Motono Moriyuki
November 9, 1988	臨時代理大使	Chargé d'affaires ad interim	佐藤 俊一	Satō Shunichi
December 28, 1988	特命全権大使	Ambassador	木内 昭胤	Kiuchi Akitane

== See also ==
- List of ambassadors of France to Japan
- Japanese people in France
- France–Japan relations
- Diplomatic rank
