= Arimatsu Hideyoshi =

Baron/ Japanese bureaucrat (1863–1927)

男爵 Baron Hideyoshi Arimatsu
- 有松 英義
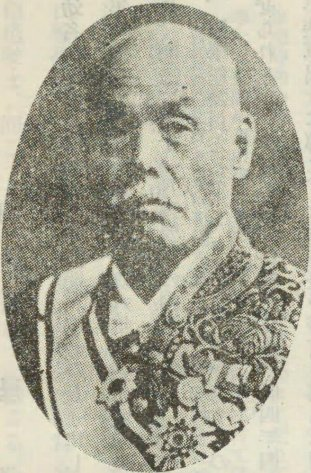

Director-General of the Cabinet Legislation Bureau
- In office 9 October 1916 – 29 September 1918
- Prime Minister: Terauchi Masatake
- Preceded by: Takahashi Sakuye
- Succeeded by: Yokoda Sennosuke

Personal details
- Born: 10 June 1863 Bizen Province, Japan
- Died: 24 October 1927 (aged 64)
- Occupation: member of House of Peers (Japan)
- Profession: Director of the Cabinet Legislation Bureau Minister of Ministry of Colonial Affairs the Head of Cabinet Pension Bureau
- Awards: Order of the Rising Sun(1st class) Russo-Japanese War Medal Order of the Sacred Treasure Enthronement of Emperor Taisho Medal

Baron Hideyoshi Arimatsu (有松 英義; 10 June 1863 – 24 October 1927) was a member of House of Peers (Japan) and a bureaucrat acted as Director-General of the Cabinet Legislation Bureau, Minister of Colonial Affairs, and the Head of Cabinet Pension Bureau during the 18th cabinet of military regime Terauchi Masatake (寺内正毅).

== Biography ==
Arimatsu Hideyoshi was born in Mino-gun in Bizen Province as the child of Masayoshi Arimatsu of the Okayama Domain. In 1881, after graduating from Okayama School, he became a disciple of Sinologist Nishi Kiichi while teaching at Obie elementary school in Kuboya County. The book of Mutsu Munemitsu made him aspire to study Western learning in Tokyo, and asked advice from Komatsubara Eitarō who also had studied with Nishi. Concerned that Arimatsu was deeply influenced by Nishi who was immersed in the Freedom and People's Rights Movement, in 1884 Komatsubara supported Arimatsu to enroll at Doitsugaku Kyōkai Gakkō college to study German law and politics that was opened by Doitsugaku Kyōkai, or "Verein für deutsche Wissenschaften", founded in line with national policy in 1881.

The founding members of the Doitsugaku Kyōkai Gakkō included academics Nishi Amane and Katō Hiroyuki with German Enlightenment thoughts, and politicians Inoue Kaoru, Katsura Tarō, Hirata Tōsuke and Shinagawa Yajirō, as well as diplomat Aoki Shūzō. Professor Georg Michaelis influenced Arimatsu so much that he applied the Higher Civilian Trial in 1888 and passed as the first private college graduate.

=== Political career ===
There were five offices to which officers as a Higher Civilian like Arimatsu would be appointed; an executive civil officer, a diplomat, a consul, a judge or a public prosecutor. However Arimatsu wished to take an administrative post, he was so discouraged to be appointed in December 1888 to an assistant judge at local Mito court which performed the first trial of minor civil affair and criminal cases, that he resigned in less than one month (while his resignation was not accepted but taken into the custody of Minister for Justice and handled as a leave of absence from duty).

Arimatsu sought to work for politician Inoue Kaoru who was a founding member of the Doitsugaku Kyōkai Gakkō college he graduated, and was hired as a reporter for "Jiji Shimpō" (Autonomy News), a newsletter Inoue published before organising autonomy party Jichitō. Two years later, Inoue failed to found Jichitō and the magazine was discontinued, when Minister of Justice granted Arimatsu an opportunity and appointed him a judge. Arimitsu's outstanding accomplishment promoted him to the post of Counsellor, Department of Justice in November 1892. As a Counsellor, he supported the government during the dispute on how it controlled the annual expenditure and Article 67, Chapter 6 of the Meiji Constitution; Imperial Diet without an agreement of the government cannot reduce or void the established annual expenditure. His deed was highly esteemed, and promoted him to Councillor of Ministry of Agriculture and Commerce in December 1892.

It was in March 1893 when he held the posts of Councillor of Cabinet Legislation Bureau and Home Ministry Secretary, contributing to drafting, draft making for the Security Police Act, Administration Execution Act, Copyright Act, and Publishing Law. Left Japan for Madrid as a Japanese representative to participate in a conference on sanitation and demography in February 1893, and in May same year, assigned to join the new international conference for the welfare of the orphaned and abandoned children as a committee member.

During his office at Chief of Police Bureau (1903–1904 / 1908–1911) for the first and the second Katsura Tarō Cabinet, he commanded the investigation of the High Treason Incident in 1910, when police arrested socialist-anarchist Kōtoku Shūsui and others prosecuted to the death penalty. Performing the Imperial compilation, Arimatsu was administered an Imperial nominee to the House of Peers on 24 August 1911 and with resignation from government official, enrolled the largest Parliamentary group "Kenkyūkai", among members with wide social background including marquis, earl and baron, Imperial nominee, as well as millionaire.

In the 1911 term, Arimatsu served the government from 1912 as the Minister of the Imperial Forestry Administration Agency before the Agency was reformed, then the Director of the Privy Council Clerks from April 1914. During Terauchi Cabinet, Arimatsu returned to justice administration holding posts of the 18th Director of the Legislation Bureau (1916-1918) and the Head of Cabinet Pension Bureau, and the Minister of Colonial Affairs (February–September, 1918). He finished his governmental career after holding office as the Privy Councilor from February 1920 to September 1927 at the age of 64.

Retired from the political career, Arimatsu spent later years as a dedicated head of patrons for the Doitsugaku Kyōkai Gakkō college firstly by negotiation with creditors and talked them out of the attempt to suit for seizure of the school property, and stabilized the economic status of his alma mater. Arimatsu left the government during his term as the 12th Governor of Mie Prefecture between 1904 and 1908.

== Awards and honors ==
- 15 May 1903 - Order of the Rising Sun 6th Class, Silver Rays
- 22 December 1905 - Order of the Sacred Treasure 4th class, Gold Rays with Rosette
- 1 April 1906 - 1904-05 Russo-Japanese War Medal
- 10 November 1915 - Enthronement of Emperor Taisho Medal
- 1 April 1916 - Order of the Rising Sun 2nd Class, Gold and Silver Star
- 1 July 1921 - First National Census Medal
- 24 October 1927 - Order of the Rising Sun 1st Class, Grand Cordon

== See also ==
- High Treason Incident
