= 1920 Japanese general election =

- 10 May 1920

All 464 seats in the House of Representatives 233 seats needed for a majority
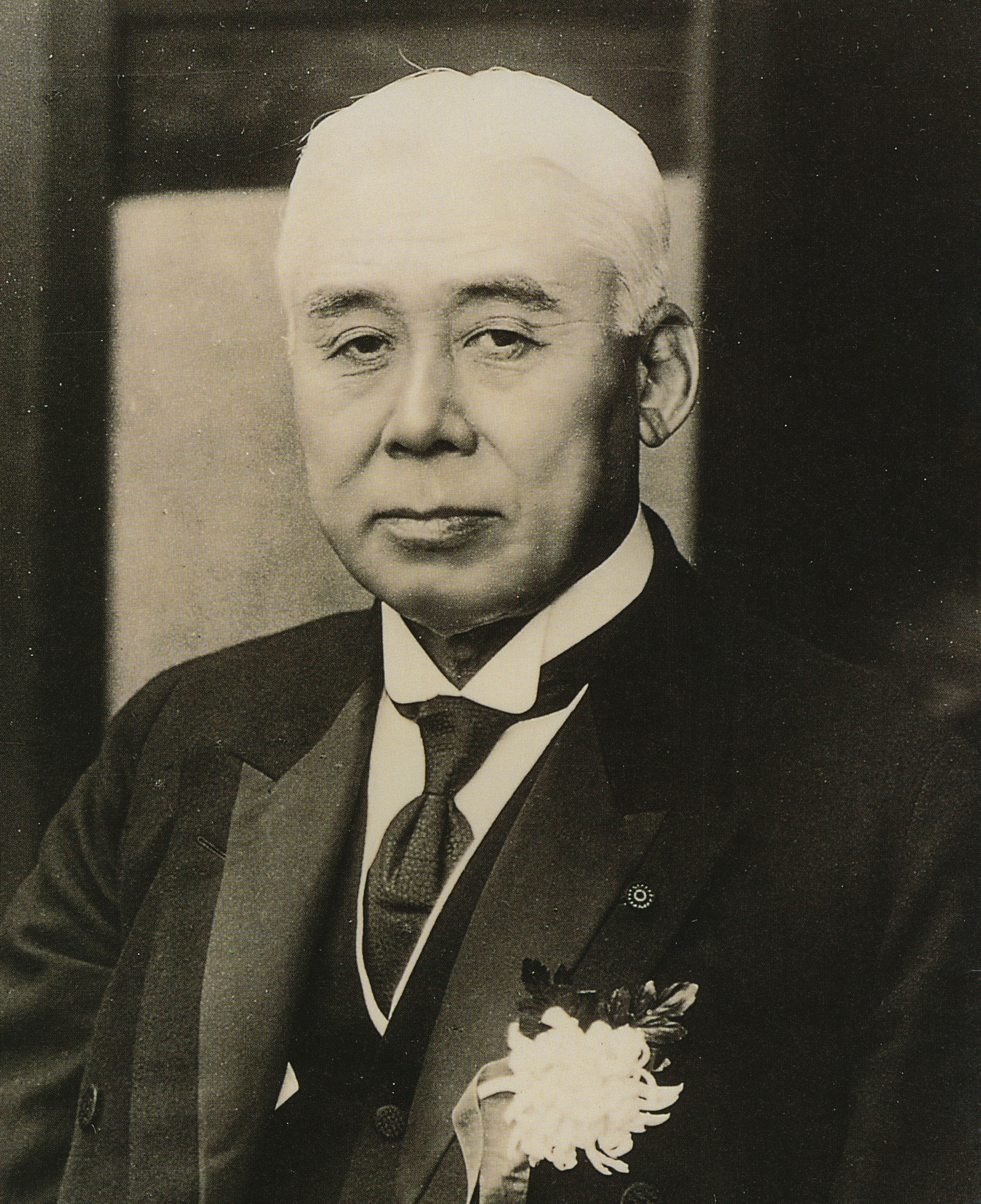

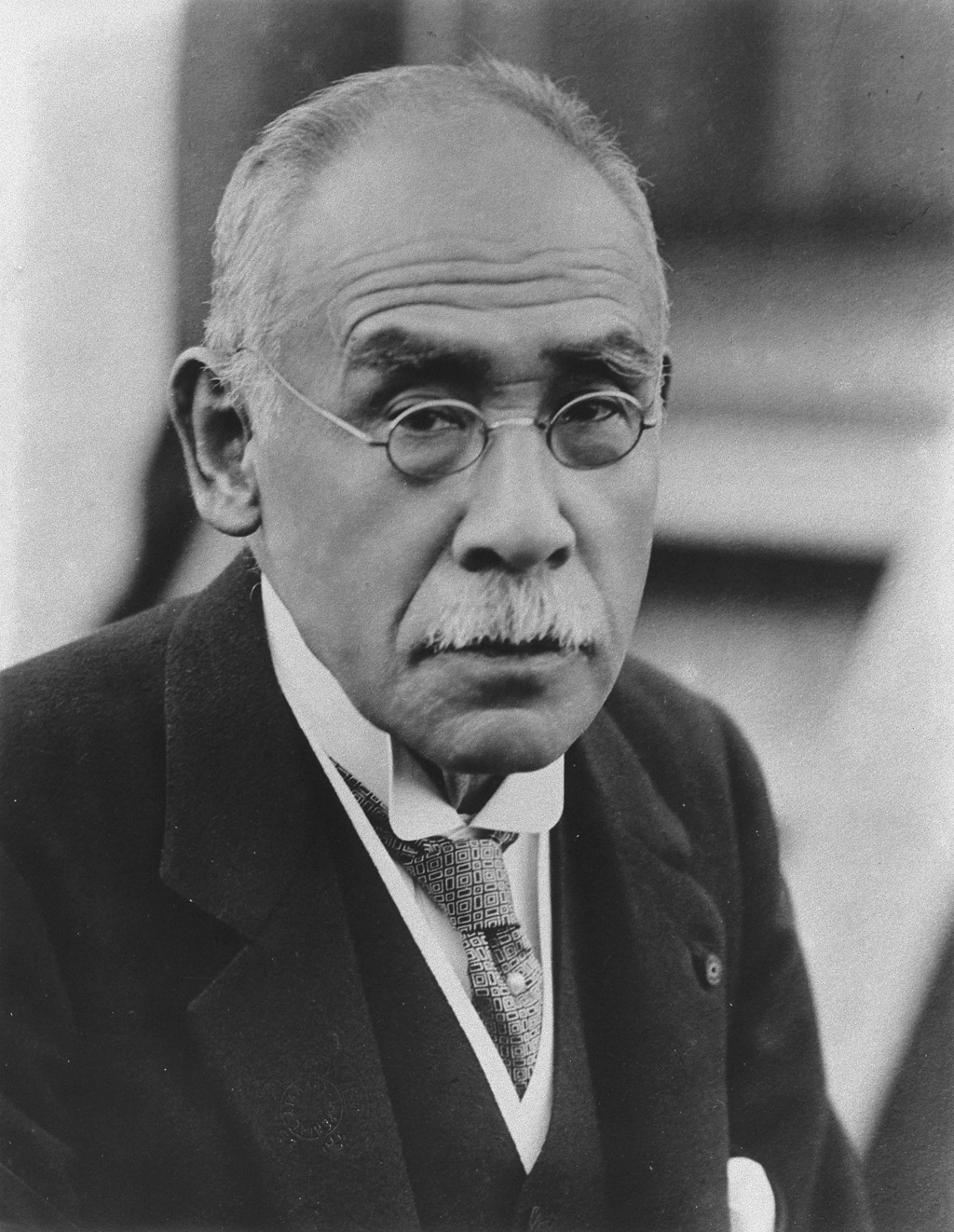

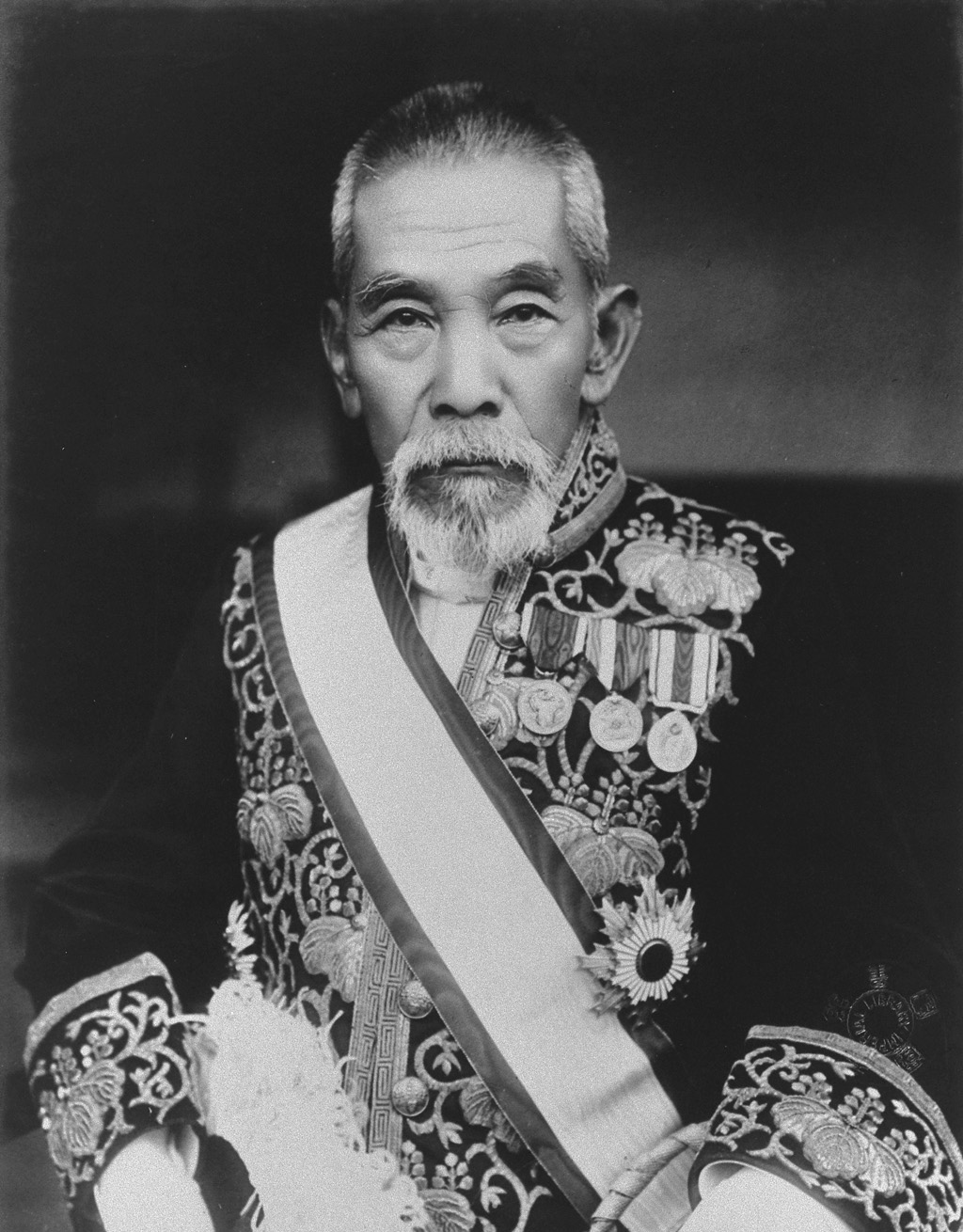
	First party	Second party	Third party
Leader	Hara Takashi	Kato Takaaki	Inukai Tsuyoshi
Party	Rikken Seiyūkai	Kenseikai	Rikken Kokumintō
Last election	38.80%, 165 seats	35.94%, 121 seats	9.68%, 35 seats
Seats won	278	110	29
Seat change	▲113	▼11	▼6
Popular vote	1,471,728	715,500	140,397
Percentage	55.77%	27.11%	5.32%
Swing	▲16.97pp	▼8.83pp	▼4.36pp
Prime Minister before election
Hara Takashi
Rikken Seiyūkai
Elected Prime Minister
Hara Takashi
Rikken Seiyūkai

General elections were held in Japan on 10 May 1920. The result was a victory for the Rikken Seiyūkai party led by Hara Takashi, which won 278 of the 464 seats.

== Electoral system ==
Following electoral reforms in 1919, the 464 members of the House of Representatives were elected in 295 single-member constituencies, 68 two-member constituencies and 11 three-member constituencies. Voting was restricted to men aged over 25 who paid at least 3 yen a year in direct taxation, reduced from 10 yen in the 1917 elections, increasing the proportion of the population able to vote to 6%.

== Results ==
Party	Votes	%	Seats	+/–
Rikken Seiyūkai	1,471,728	55.77	278	+113
Kenseikai	715,500	27.11	110	–11
Rikken Kokumintō	140,397	5.32	29	–6
Others	311,444	11.80	47	–13
Total	2,639,069	100.00	464	+83
Valid votes	2,639,069	99.15		
Invalid/blank votes	22,573	0.85		
Total votes	2,661,642	100.00		
Registered voters/turnout	3,069,148	86.72		
Source: Mackie & Rose, Voice Japan
