= Terauchi Masatake =

Japanese general, prime minister from 1916 to 1918

Gensui Count Terauchi Masatake
- 寺内 正毅
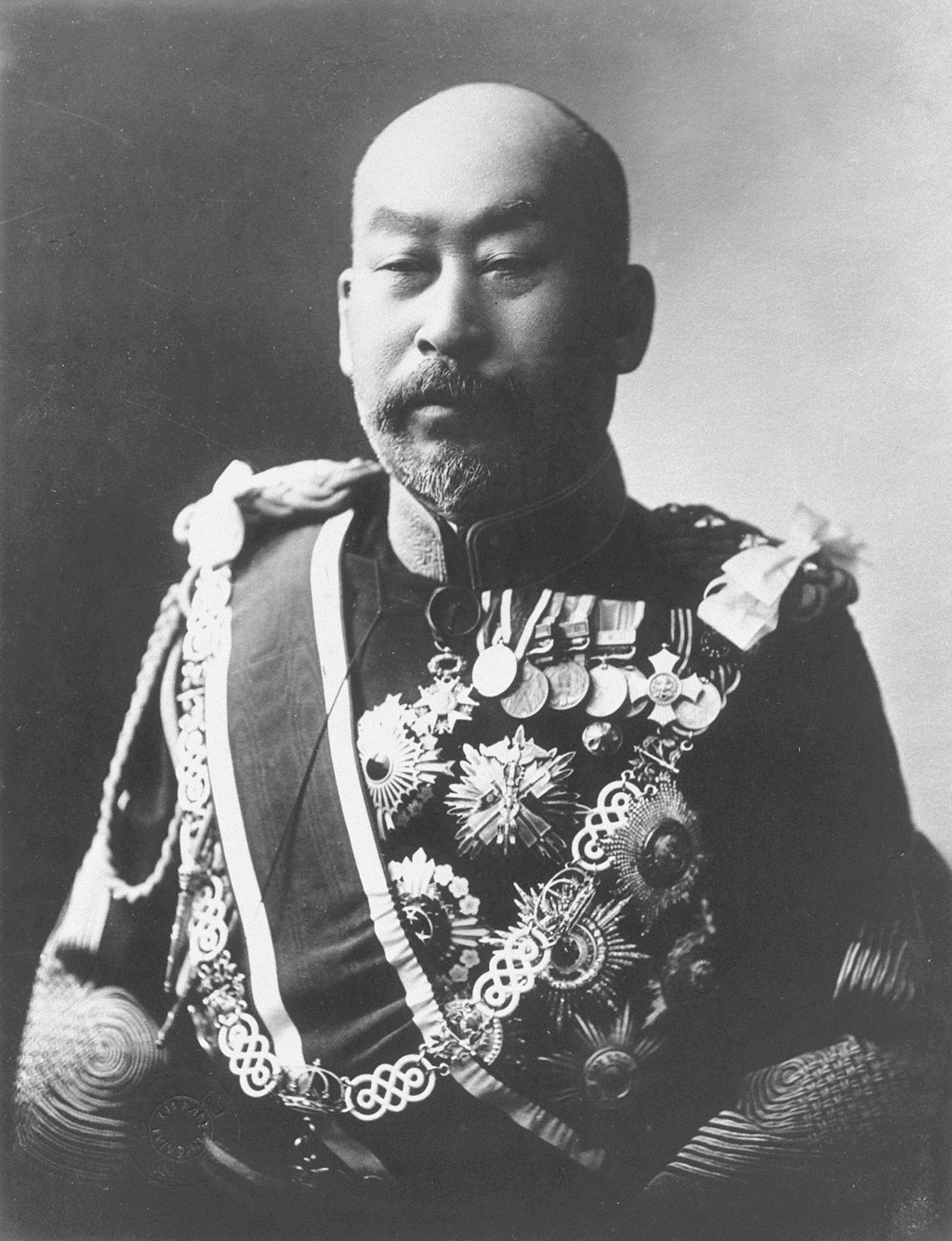

Prime Minister of Japan
- In office 9 October 1916 – 29 September 1918
- Monarch: Taishō
- Preceded by: Ōkuma Shigenobu
- Succeeded by: Hara Takashi

Minister of Finance
- In office 9 October – 16 December 1916
- Prime Minister: Himself
- Preceded by: Taketomi Tokitoshi
- Succeeded by: Kazue Shōda

Minister for Foreign Affairs
- Acting
- In office 9 October – 21 November 1916
- Prime Minister: Himself
- Preceded by: Ishii Kikujirō
- Succeeded by: Motono Ichirō
- In office 14 July – 27 August 1908
- Prime Minister: Katsura Tarō
- Preceded by: Hayashi Tadasu
- Succeeded by: Komura Jutarō

Governor-General of Korea
- In office 1 October 1910 – 9 October 1916
- Monarchs: Meiji; Taishō
- Preceded by: Himself (as Resident-General)
- Succeeded by: Hasegawa Yoshimichi

Resident-General of Korea
- In office 30 May – 1 October 1910
- Monarch: Meiji
- Preceded by: Sone Arasuke
- Succeeded by: Himself (as Governor-General)

Minister of the Army
- In office 27 March 1902 – 30 August 1911
- Prime Minister: Katsura Tarō; Saionji Kinmochi
- Preceded by: Kodama Gentarō
- Succeeded by: Ishimoto Shinroku

Inspector-General of Military Training
- In office 14 January 1904 – 9 May 1905
- Monarch: Meiji
- Preceded by: Nozu Michitsura
- Succeeded by: Nishi Kanjirō
- In office 22 January 1898 – 25 April 1900
- Monarch: Meiji
- Preceded by: Position established
- Succeeded by: Nozu Michitsura

Personal details
- Born: 5 February 1852 Yamaguchi, Chōshū Domain, Japan
- Died: 3 November 1919 (aged 67) Tokyo, Japan
- Party: Independent
- Spouse(s): Terauchi Tani (died 1890) Terauchi Taki (after 1890)
- Children: Hisaichi Terauchi
- Relatives: Hideo Kodama (son-in-law)
- Awards: Order of the Rising Sun; Order of the Golden Kite; Order of the Bath
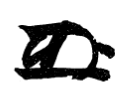
- Signature

Military service
- Allegiance: Empire of Japan
- Branch/service: Imperial Japanese Army
- Years of service: 1871–1910
- Rank: Field Marshal
- Battles/wars: Boshin War; Battle of Hakodate; Satsuma Rebellion; Battle of Tabaruzaka (WIA); First Sino-Japanese War; Russo-Japanese War

Count Terauchi Masatake (寺内 正毅; 5 February 1852 – 3 November 1919) was a Japanese military officer and politician who served as prime minister of Japan from 1916 to 1918. He was a Gensui (or Marshal) in the Imperial Japanese Army.

== Military career ==
Terauchi Masatake was born in Hirai Village, Suo Province (present-day Yamaguchi city, Yamaguchi Prefecture), and was the third son of Utada Masasuke, a samurai in the service of Chōshū Domain. He was later adopted by a relative on his mother's side of the family, Terauchi Kanuemon, and changed his family name to "Terauchi".

As a youth, he was a member of the Kiheitai militia from 1864, and fought in the Boshin War against the Tokugawa shogunate from 1867, most notably at the Battle of Hakodate. After the victory at Hakodate, he travelled to Kyoto, where he joined the Ministry of War and was drilled by French instructors in Western weaponry and tactics. He became a member of Emperor Meiji's personal guard in 1870 and travelled with the Emperor to Tokyo. He left military service in 1871 to pursue language studies, but was recalled with the formation the fledgling Imperial Japanese Army in 1871 and was commissioned as a second lieutenant after attending the Army's Toyama School. He was appointed to the staff of the new Imperial Japanese Army Academy in 1873. He fought against the Satsuma Rebellion in 1877 and was injured and lost his right hand during the Battle of Tabaruzaka. His physical disability did not prove to be an impediment to his future military and political career.

In 1882, he was sent to France as aide-de-camp to Prince Kan'in Kotohito and was appointed a military attaché the following year. He remained in France for studies until 1886. On his return to Japan, he was appointed deputy chief of staff to the minister of the Army. In 1887, he became commandant of the Army Academy. In 1891, he was chief of staff to the IJA 1st Division and in 1892 was chief of the First Bureau (Operations) of the Imperial Japanese Army General Staff.

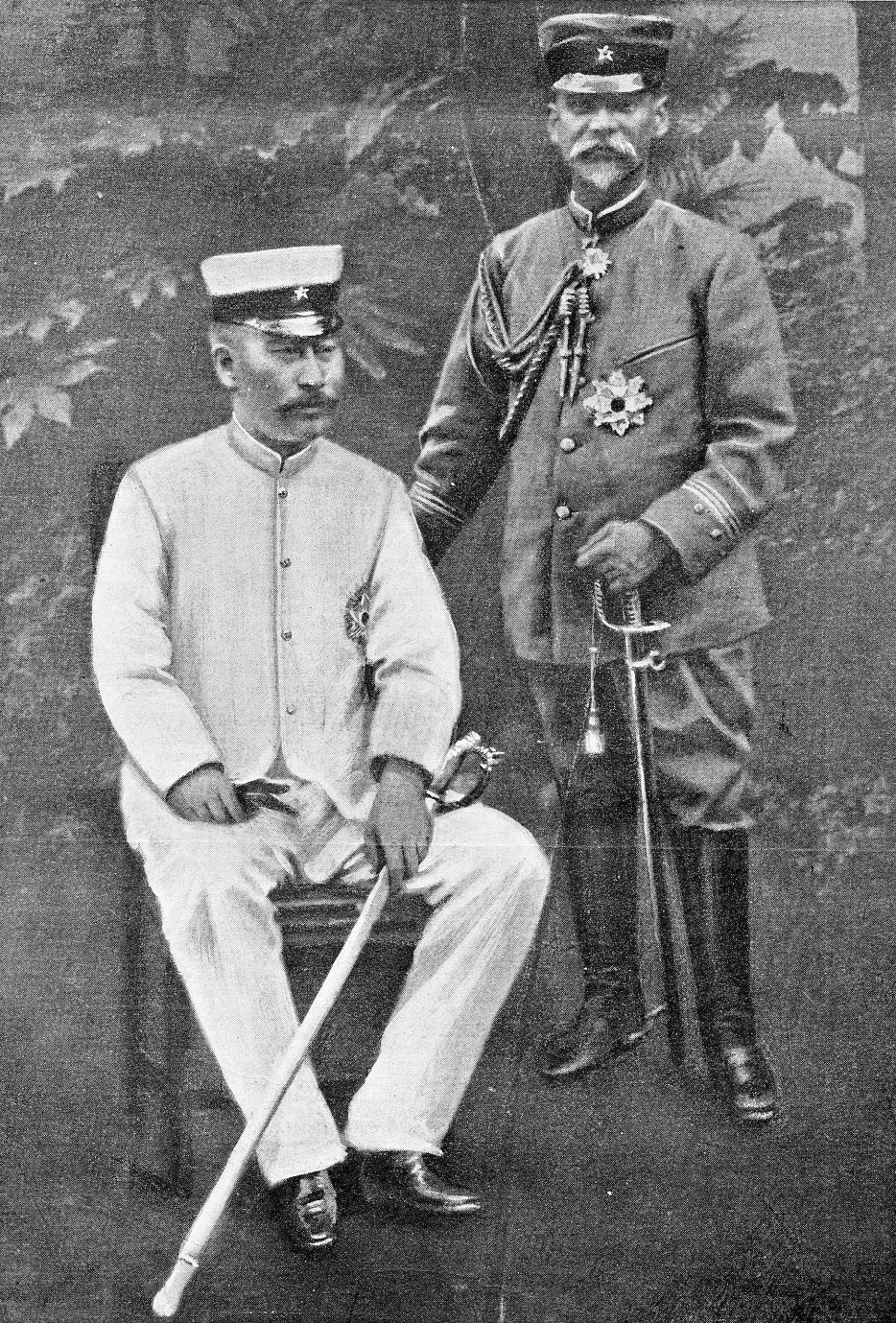
Terauchi Masatake (left) with General Kodama Gentarō (right) in 1904

With the start of the First Sino-Japanese War in 1894, Terauchi was appointed Director of Transportation and Communications for the Imperial General Headquarters, which made him responsible for all movement of troops and supplies during the war. In 1896, he was assigned command of the IJA 3rd Infantry Brigade. In 1898, he was promoted to become the first Inspector General of Military Training, which he made one of the three highest positions in the army. In 1900, he became Deputy Chief of Staff of the Army, and went to China to personally oversee Japanese force during the Boxer Rebellion

Terauchi was appointed as Minister of the Army in 1901, during the first Katsura administration. The Russo-Japanese War (1904–1905) occurred during his term in office. He was also made a chairman of the South Manchurian Railway Company in 1906. In 1907, in recognition of the four wars he had served in, he was elevated to viscount (子爵, Shishaku) in the kazoku peerage.

He continued in office as Army Minister under the first Saionji administration and the second Katsura administration from July 1908 to August 1911.

== Governor-General of Korea (1910–1916) ==
Following the assassination of former prime minister Itō Hirobumi in Harbin by a Korean nationalist, An Jung-geun in October 1909, Terauchi was appointed to replace Sone Arasuke as the third and last Japanese Resident-General of Korea in May 1910. As Resident-General, he executed the Japan–Korea Annexation Treaty in August of the same year, and he thus became the first Japanese governor-general of Korea. In this position, he reported directly to the Emperor and as proconsul had wide-ranging powers ranging from legislative, administrative, and judicial to effect changes and reforms. The annexation of Korea by Japan and subsequent policies introduced by the new government was highly unpopular with the majority of the Korean population, and Terauchi (who concurrently maintained his position as Army Minister) employed military force to maintain control. However, he preferred to use the deep historical and cultural ties between Korea and Japan as justification for the eventual goal of complete assimilation of Korea into the Japanese mainstream. To this end, thousands of schools were built across Korea. Although this contributed greatly to an increase in literacy and the educational standard, the curriculum was centered on Japanese language and Japanese history, with the intent of assimilation of the populace into loyal subjects of the Empire of Japan.

Other of Terauchi's policies also had noble goals but unforeseen consequences. For example, land reform was desperately needed in Korea. The Korean land ownership system was a complex system of absentee landlords, partial owner-tenants, and cultivators with traditional but without legal proof of ownership. Terauchi's new Land Survey Bureau conducted cadastral surveys that reestablished ownership by basis of written proof (deeds, titles, and similar documents). Ownership was denied to those who could not provide such written documentation (mostly lower class and partial owners, who had only traditional verbal "cultivator rights"). Although the plan succeeded in reforming land ownership/taxation structures, it added tremendously to Korean hostility, bitterness, and resentment towards Japanese administration by enabling a huge amount of Korean land (roughly 2/3 of all privately owned lands by some estimates) to be seized by the government and sold to Japanese developers.

In recognition of his work in Korea, his title was raised to that of hakushaku (count) in 1911.

Isabel Anderson, who visited Korea and met Count Terauchi in 1912, wrote as follows:

The Japanese Governor-General, Count Terauchi, is a very strong and able man, and under his administration many improvements have been made in Korea. This has not always been done without friction between the natives and their conquerors, it must be confessed, but the results are certainly astonishing. The government has been reorganized, courts have been established, the laws have been revised, trade conditions have been improved and commerce has increased. Agriculture has been encouraged by the opening of experiment stations, railroads have been constructed from the interior to the sea-coast, and harbours have been dredged and lighthouses erected. Japanese expenditures in Korea have amounted to twelve million dollars yearly.

— Isabel Anderson, The Spell of Japan, 1914

For reference, the $12 million figure in Anderson's book is roughly equivalent to $373.1 million in 2023.

== Premiership (1916–1918) ==
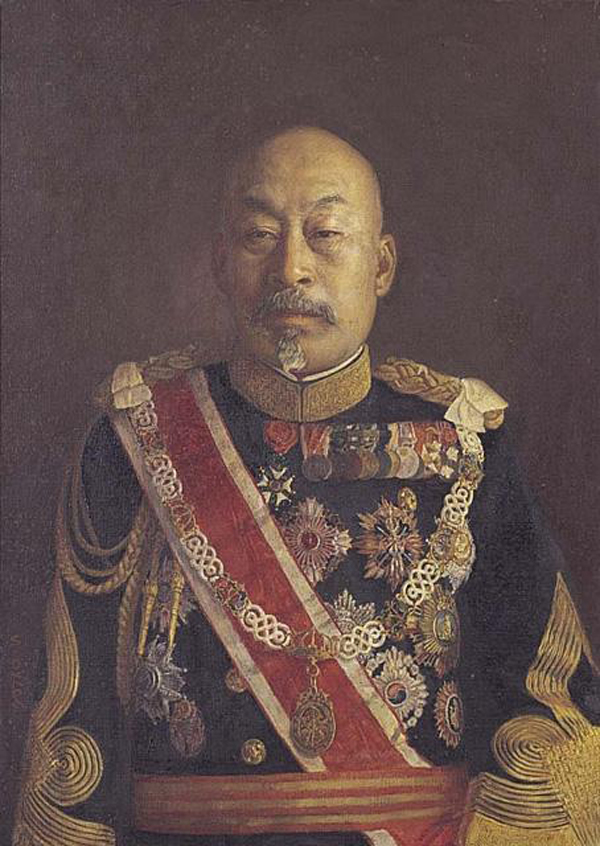
- Portrait by Okada Saburōsuke
- Premiership of Terauchi Masatake; 9 October 1916 – 29 September 1918
- Monarch: Emperor Taishō
- Cabinet: Terauchi Cabinet
- Party: Military (Army)
- Election: 1917
- Seat: Naikaku Sōri Daijin Kantei
- Emblem of the Government of Japan

In June 1916, Terauchi he received his promotion to the largely ceremonial rank of Gensui (or Field Marshal). In October, he became Prime Minister, and concurrently held the cabinet posts of Foreign Minister and Finance Minister. His cabinet consisted solely of career bureaucrats as he distrusted career civilian politicians.

During his tenure, Terauchi pursued an aggressive foreign policy. He oversaw the Nishihara Loans (made to support the Chinese warlord Duan Qirui in exchange for confirmation of Japanese claims to parts of Shandong Province and increased rights in Manchuria) and the Lansing–Ishii Agreement (recognizing Japan's special rights in China). Terauchi upheld Japan's obligations to the United Kingdom under the Anglo-Japanese Alliance in World War I, dispatching ships from the Imperial Japanese Navy to the South Pacific, Indian Ocean and Mediterranean, and seizing control of German colonies in Qingdao and the Pacific Ocean. After the war, Japan joined the Allies in the Siberian Intervention (whereby Japan sent troops into Siberia in support of White Russian forces against the Bolshevik Red Army in the Russian Revolution).

In September 1918, Terauchi resigned his office, due to the rice riots that had spread throughout Japan due to inflation; he died the following year.

His decorations included the Order of the Rising Sun (1st class) and Order of the Golden Kite (1st Class).

The billiken doll, which was a Kewpie-like fad toy invented in 1908 and was very popular in Japan, lent its name to the Terauchi administration, partly due to the doll's uncanny resemblance to Count Terauchi's bald head.

== Legacy ==
Terauchi's eldest son, Count Terauchi Hisaichi, was the commander of the Imperial Japanese Army's Southern Expeditionary Army Group during World War II. The 2nd Count Terauchi also held the rank of Gensui (or Marshal) like his father. Terauchi's eldest daughter married Count Hideo Kodama, the son of General Kodama Gentaro.

== Honours ==
From the corresponding article in the Japanese Wikipedia

=== Peerages ===
- Viscount (21 September 1907)
- Count (21 April 1911)

=== Japanese decorations ===
- 1892 – Order of the Sacred Treasure, 3rd class
- 1894 – Order of the Rising Sun, 4th class
- 1895 – Order of the Golden Kite, 3rd class
- 1895 – Order of the Rising Sun, 3rd class
- 1899 - Order of the Sacred Treasure, 2nd class
- 1901 – Grand Cordon of the Order of the Rising Sun
- 1901 – Order of the Rising Sun, 4th class
- 1906 – Order of the Golden Kite, 1st class
- 1906 – Order of the Rising Sun with Paulownia Flowers
- 1919 – Grand Cordon of the Order of the Chrysanthemum (posthumous)

=== Foreign decorations (partial list) ===
- 1886 – France - Legion of Honour, Chevalier
- 1891 – France - Legion of Honour, Officier
- 1894 – Ottoman Empire - Order of the Medjidie, Commandeur
- 1897 – - Russia - Order of Saint Stanislaus, 1st class
- 1897 – France - Legion of Honour, Commandeur
- 1906 – Knight Grand Cross of the Order of the Bath (GCB) (15 March 1906)
- 1907 – Annam - Order of the Dragon of Annam, Commander

== Popular culture ==
- Portrayed by Lee Young-seok in the 2015 film Assassination.

Political offices
Preceded by Kodama Gentarō	War Minister; March 1902 – August 1911	Succeeded by Ishimoto Shinroku
Preceded by Hayashi Tadasu	Minister of Foreign Affairs; July 1908 – August 1908	Succeeded by Komura Jutarō
Preceded by Sone Arasuke	Resident General of Korea; May 1910 – October 1910	Succeeded by Himself as Governor General of Korea
Preceded by Himself as Resident General of Korea	Governor General of Korea; October 1910 – October 1916	Succeeded by Hasegawa Yoshimichi
Preceded by Ishii Kikujirō	Minister of Foreign Affairs; October 1916 – November 1916	Succeeded by Motono Ichirō
Preceded by Taketomi Tokitoshi	Finance Minister; October 1916 – December 1916	Succeeded by Kazue Shōda
Preceded by Ōkuma Shigenobu	Prime Minister of Japan; October 1916 – September 1918	Succeeded by Hara Takashi
Military offices
Preceded by none	Inspector-General of Military Training; January 1898 – April 1900	Succeeded by Nozu Michitsura
Preceded by Nozu Michitsura	Inspector-General of Military Training; January 1904 – May 1905	Succeeded by Nishii Hiroshi
