= Enkichi Ōki =

Japanese politician (1871-1926)

Count Enkichi Ōki
- 大木 遠吉
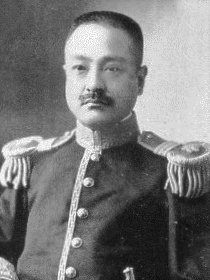
- Enkichi Ōki

Minister of Railways
- In office 12 June 1922 – 2 September 1923
- Prime Minister: Katō Tomosaburō
- Preceded by: Motoda Hajime
- Succeeded by: Yamanouchi Kazuji

Minister of Justice
- In office 15 May 1920 – 12 June 1922
- Prime Minister: Hara Takashi; Takahashi Korekiyo
- Preceded by: Hara Takashi
- Succeeded by: Okano Keijirō

Member of the House of Peers
- In office 10 July 1918 – 16 February 1926 Elected by the Counts
- In office 28 February 1908 – 9 July 1911 Elected by the Counts

Personal details
- Born: 19 September 1871 Tokyo, Japan
- Died: 14 February 1926 (aged 54) Kamigyō, Kyoto, Japan
- Party: Rikken Seiyūkai
- Parent: Ōki Takatō (father)

Count Enkichi Ōki (大木 遠吉, Ōki Enkichi; 19 September 1871 – 14 February 1926) was a Japanese statesman in the Taishō period.

== Biography ==
Ōki was born in Tokyo. His father, Ōki Takatō was one of the leaders in the Meiji Restoration, and served in numerous cabinet posts in the early Meiji government. In 1899, Enkichi succeeded to his father’s title of count (hakushaku) under the kazoku peerage system. His political career began in 1908, when he was elected to the House of Peers. He initially supported the Kenkyūkai, but soon switched his allegiance to the Rikken Seiyūkai. He was appointed Justice Minister under the cabinet of Prime Minister Hara, a post which he also held under the succeeding Takahashi administration. In 1923, he cooperated with Home Minister Tokonami Takejirō to introduce tightened anti-subversive legislature in response to increasing leftist agitation in the labor disputes, and the public emergence of the Japan Communist Party. Ōki was subsequently Railroad Minister under the Katō and Kiyoura administrations.

Preceded by Takashi Hara	Justice Minister; May 1920 – June 1922	Succeeded by Okano Keijirō
Preceded by Motoda Hajime	Railroad Minister; June 1922 – September 1923	Succeeded by Yamanouchi Ichiji
