= Minoura Katsundo =

Japanese politician

Junior Third Rank Minoura Katsundo
- 箕浦 勝人
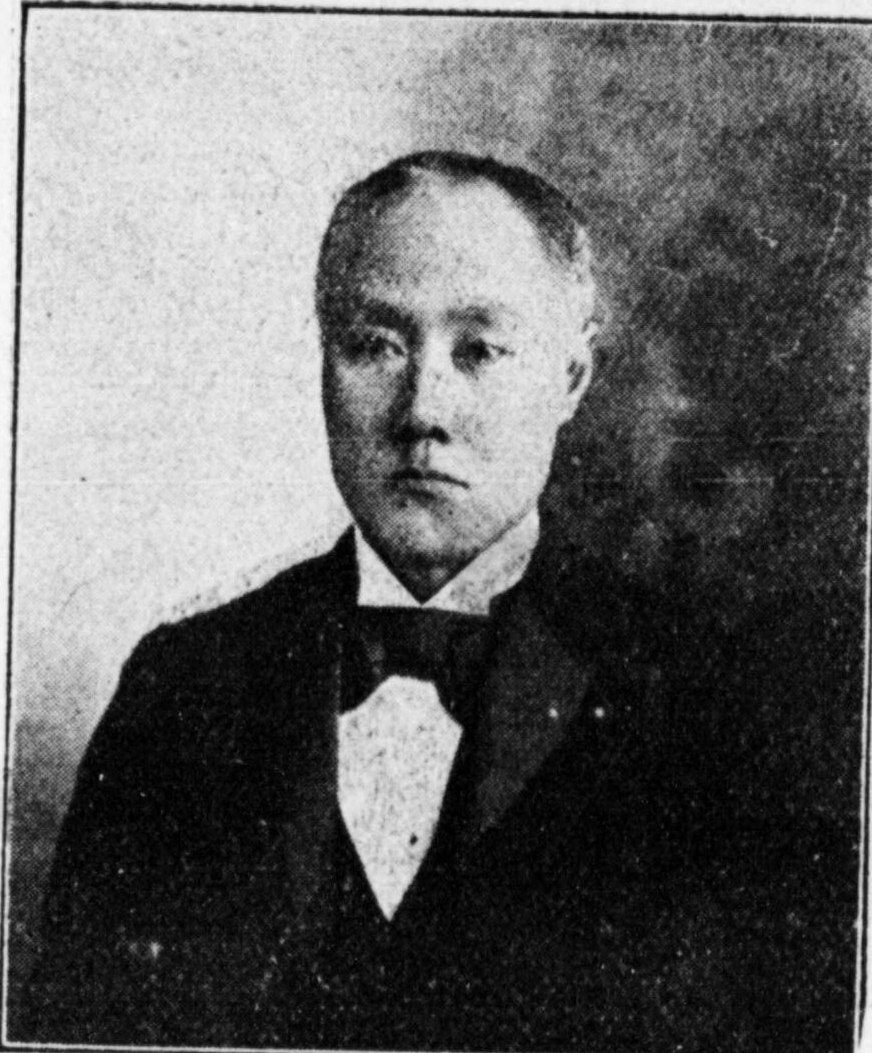
- Minoura in 1902

Minister of Communications
- In office 10 August 1915 – 9 October 1916
- Prime Minister: Ōkuma Shigenobu
- Preceded by: Taketomi Tokitoshi
- Succeeded by: Den Kenjirō

Vice Speaker of the House of Representatives
- In office 18 March 1904 – 23 December 1908
- Speaker: Matsuda Masahisa; Teiichi Sugita
- Preceded by: Teiichi Sugita
- Succeeded by: Koizuka Ryū

Member of the House of Representatives
- In office 2 July 1890 – 5 May 1926
- Preceded by: Constituency established
- Succeeded by: Miura Kazuhei
- Constituency: Ōita 2nd (1890–1898); Ōita 1st (1898–1902); Ōita Prefecture (1902–1920); Ōita 1st (1920–1926)

Personal details
- Born: 13 March 1854 Usuki, Bungo, Japan
- Died: 30 August 1929 (aged 75) Ushigome, Tokyo, Japan
- Party: Kenseikai
- Other political affiliations: Rikken Kaishintō (1890–1896); Shimpotō (1896–1898); Kenseitō (1898–1900); Kensei Hontō (1900–1910); Rikken Kokumintō (1910–1913); Rikken Dōshikai (1913–1916)
- Education: Keio University

Minoura Katsundo (箕浦 勝人; 13 March 1854 – 30 August 1929) was a journalist, entrepreneur, politician and cabinet minister in the pre-World War II Empire of Japan.

== Biography ==
Minoura was from Usuki, Bungo Province (present-day Oita Prefecture). He attended the Keio Gijuku, (the predecessor to Keio University), where he was a disciple of Fukuzawa Yukichi. After graduation, he joined the Yubin Hochi Shimbun in 1875 as a reporter, and rose rapidly ranks to become president of the company in 1890. He was once jailed for an editorial supporting greater public rights.

Joining the Rikken Kaishintō political party, he was elected to the House of Representatives of Japan in the 1890 General Election. While a member of the Diet of Japan, he was a driving force in attempts to reform the Press Law, and to remove censorship regulations and press bans, especially concerning political debates and issues. His proposals were continually defeated, until a compromise bill was passed in 1897 allowing for reduced fines and punishments. Minoura was vice-speaker of the House of Representatives from March 1904 to December 1908.

Minoura served in the Second Ōkuma Cabinet as Minister of Communications from 1915 to 1916. However, his political career ended in a sensational political corruption case in 1926, when he was arrested along with a number of high-ranking members of government for accepted bribes from real estate companies in Osaka over the relocation of the Matsushima Brothels and incarcerated at Osaka Prison. Minoura had to this point been respected by the Japanese public for having no rumor of scandal attached to his name. After a highly publicized court trial, Minoura was found not guilty on 13 October 1927 and released.

Political offices
| Preceded by Taketomi Tokitoshi | Minister of Communications; Aug 1915 – Oct 1916 | Succeeded by Den Kenjirō |
