= Seiyū Club (1913) =

Political party in Japan

The Seiyū Club (Japanese: 政友倶楽部, "Constitutional Friends Club") was a short-lived political party in Japan.

== History ==
The party was established in February 1913 as a 26 MP breakaway from Rikken Seiyūkai led Yukio Ozaki over objections to Yamamoto Gonnohyōe being appointed Prime Minister.

The party was a strident critic of Gonnohyōe and one of the strongest supporters of party government of its time. However, some members soon defected back to Rikken Seiyūkai, and in December 1913 the remaining MPs merged with Ekirakukai to form the Chūseikai.
