= Shin'ichirō Kurino =

Japanese diplomat

Viscount Shin'ichirō Kurino (栗野 慎一郎, Kurino Shin'ichirō; 29 November 1851 – 15 November 1937) was a Japanese diplomat.

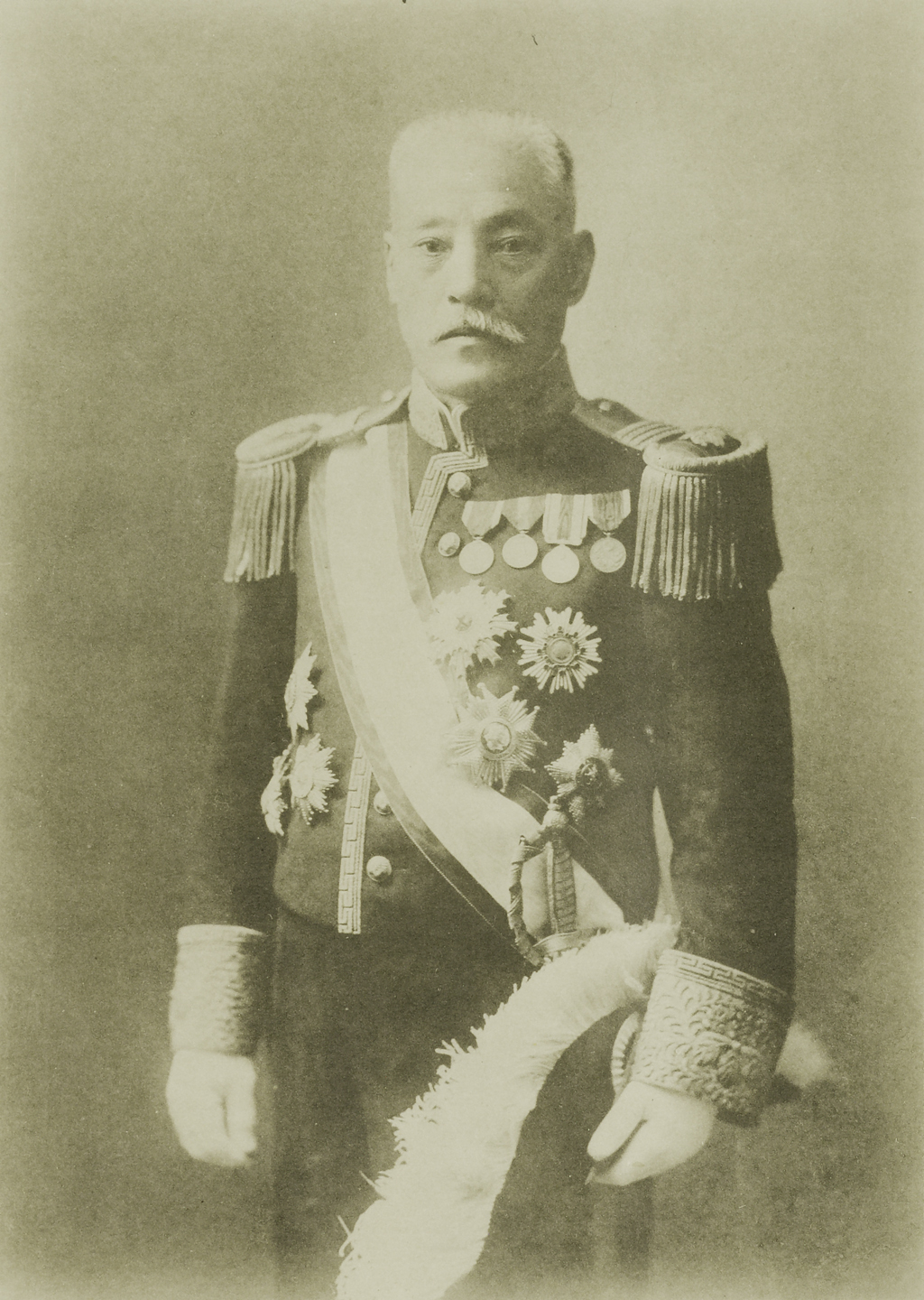
Viscount Kurino

Kurino was born in Fukuoka prefecture. He studied at Harvard University, and then worked in the Japanese Ministry of Foreign Affairs. He served as Japan's Envoy Extraordinary and Minister Plenipotentiary to the United States of America, an Envoy Extraordinary and Minister Plenipotentiary to Russia, and Ambassador to France. Kurino died in Hayama, Kanagawa.
