= Ekirakukai =

Political party in Japan

The Ekirakukai (Japanese: 亦楽会, lit. Old Friends Association) was a political party in Japan.

== History ==
The party was established as the Dōshikai ("Fellow Thinkers Association") in December 1912 by a group of 11 independent National Diet members, most of whom had previously been members of Yūshinkai. In March 1913 it was renamed Ekirakukai so as not to confuse itself with the proposed new party of Katsura Tarō, Rikken Dōshikai. By then, Ekirakukai had grown in size to 29 Diet members. In December 1913 it merged with the Seiyū Club to form the Chūseikai.
