= Taketomi Tokitoshi =

Japanese politician

- 武富 時敏
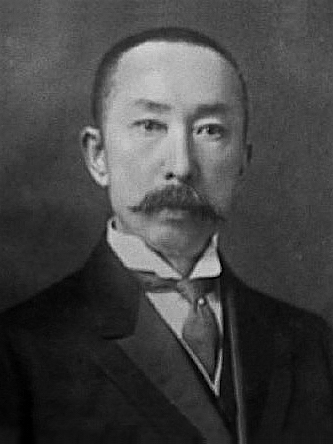

Minister of Finance
- In office 10 August 1915 – 9 October 1916
- Prime Minister: Ōkuma Shigenobu
- Preceded by: Wakatsuki Reijirō
- Succeeded by: Terauchi Masatake

Minister of Communications
- In office 16 April 1914 – 10 August 1915
- Prime Minister: Ōkuma Shigenobu
- Preceded by: Motoda Hajime
- Succeeded by: Minoura Katsundo

Chief Cabinet Secretary
- In office 30 June 1898 – 8 November 1898
- Prime Minister: Ōkuma Shigenobu
- Preceded by: Sameshima Takenosuke
- Succeeded by: Ban'ichirō Yasuhiro

Member of the House of Peers
- In office 3 July 1924 – 22 December 1938 Nominated by the Emperor

Member of the House of Representatives
- In office 2 March 1894 – 31 January 1924
- Preceded by: Sakamoto Norimasa
- Succeeded by: Minoru Nakano
- Constituency: Saga 1st (1894–1902); Saga Counties (1902–1917); Saga City (1917–1920); Saga 2nd (1920–1924)
- In office 2 July 1890 – 25 December 1891
- Preceded by: Constituency established
- Succeeded by: Ushijima Shūichirō
- Constituency: Saga 1st

Personal details
- Born: 16 January 1856 Saga, Hizen, Japan
- Died: 22 December 1938 (aged 82) Shinjuku, Tokyo, Japan
- Resting place: Aoyama Cemetery
- Party: Kenseikai
- Other political affiliations: See list: Rikken Kaishintō (1882–1890); Jiyūtō (1890–1894); Rikken Kakushintō (1894–1896); Shimpotō (1896–1898); Kenseitō (1898–1900); Kensei Hontō (1900–1910); Rikken Kokumintō (1910–1913); Rikken Dōshikai (1913–1916)
- Education: Daigakkō

Taketomi Tokitoshi (武富時敏; 16 January 1856 – 22 December 1938) was a Japanese politician and cabinet minister in the Meiji and Taishō periods of Japan.

== Biography ==
Taketomi was born in Saga as the eldest son of a samurai in the service of the Saga Domain. After the Meiji Restoration, he travelled to Tokyo to study the English language, but soon returned to his native Saga. He participated in the Saga Rebellion of 1874 against the Meiji government. After the failure of the rebellion, he returned to Tokyo and studied at the Daigaku Nankō, and later met Soejima Taneomi who turned his interest to politics. He was one of the founders of the Kyushu Kaishintō in 1882 and the Hizen Nippō newspaper. Elected to the Saga Prefectural Assembly in 1883 and became chairman of the assembly in 1885.

Taketomi was elected to the lower house of the Diet of Japan in the 1890 General Election. Although defeated in the 1892 General Election, he was reelected in the March 1894 General Election, and served twelve consecutive terms until 1924. He was one of the founders of the Rikken Kaishintō in 1894. Over the course of his career, he moved from the Shimpotō, Kenseitō, Kensei Hontō, Rikken Kokumintō, Rikken Dōshikai, Kenseikai and finally Rikken Minseitō.

Taketomi served as director of the Commerce and Industry Bureau of the Ministry of Agriculture and Commerce and as councilor to the Ministry of Finance in 1897. He became Chief Cabinet Secretary under the Ōkuma administration in 1898.

In April 1914, Taketomi was appointed Communications Minister in the 2nd Ōkuma administration, serving in that capacity to August 1915. He was then appointed Minister of Finance in the same administration, serving until October 1916. Taketomi was appointed to a seat in the House of Peers in 1924.

Political offices
Preceded by Motoda Hajime	Minister of Communications; 16 Apr 1914 – 10 August 1915	Succeeded by Minoura Katsundo
Preceded by Wakatsuki Reijirō	Minister of Finance; 10 August 1915 – 9 October 1916	Succeeded by Terauchi Masatake (interim)
