= 1917 Japanese general election =

- 20 April 1917

All 381 seats in the House of Representatives 191 seats needed for a majority
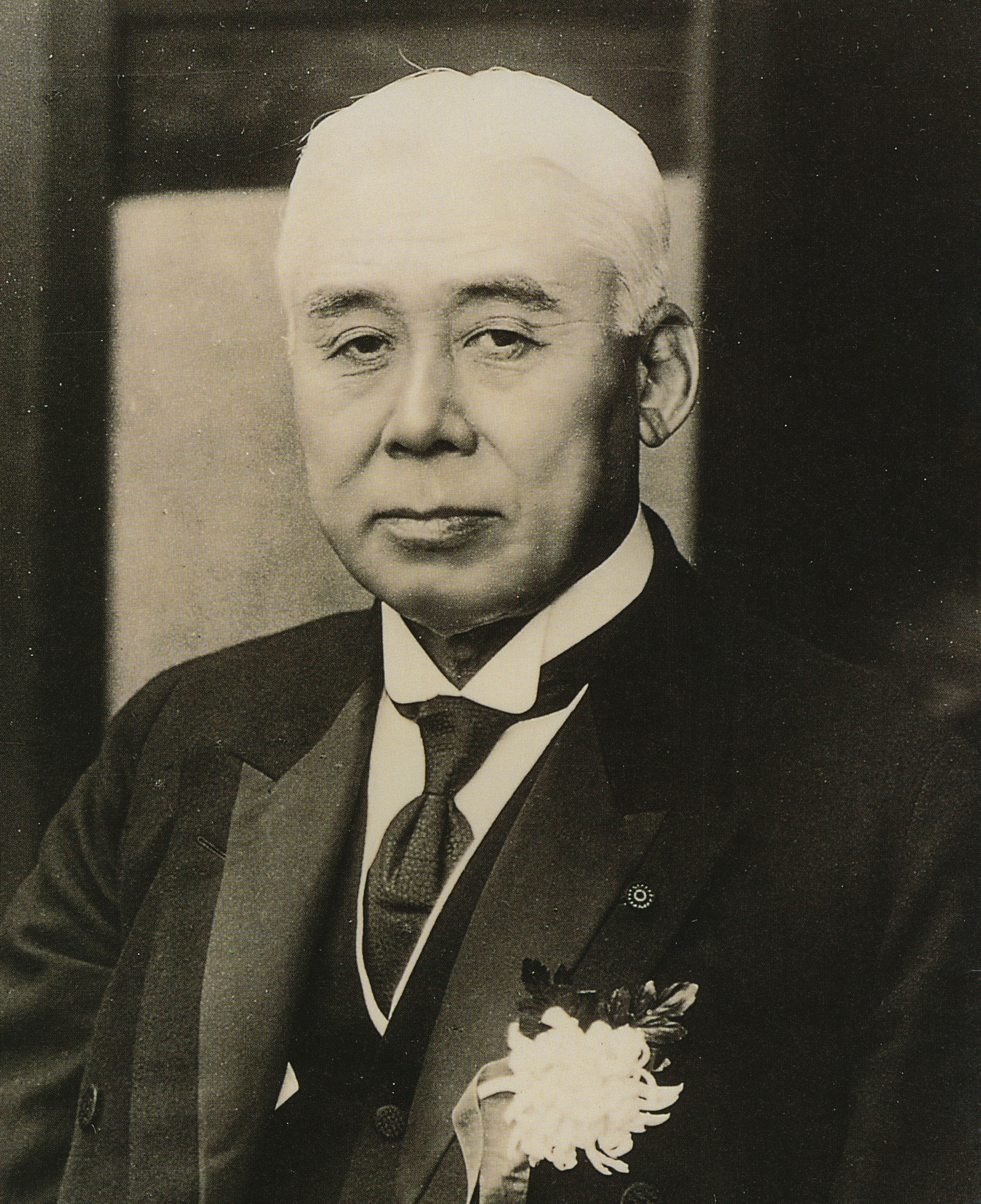

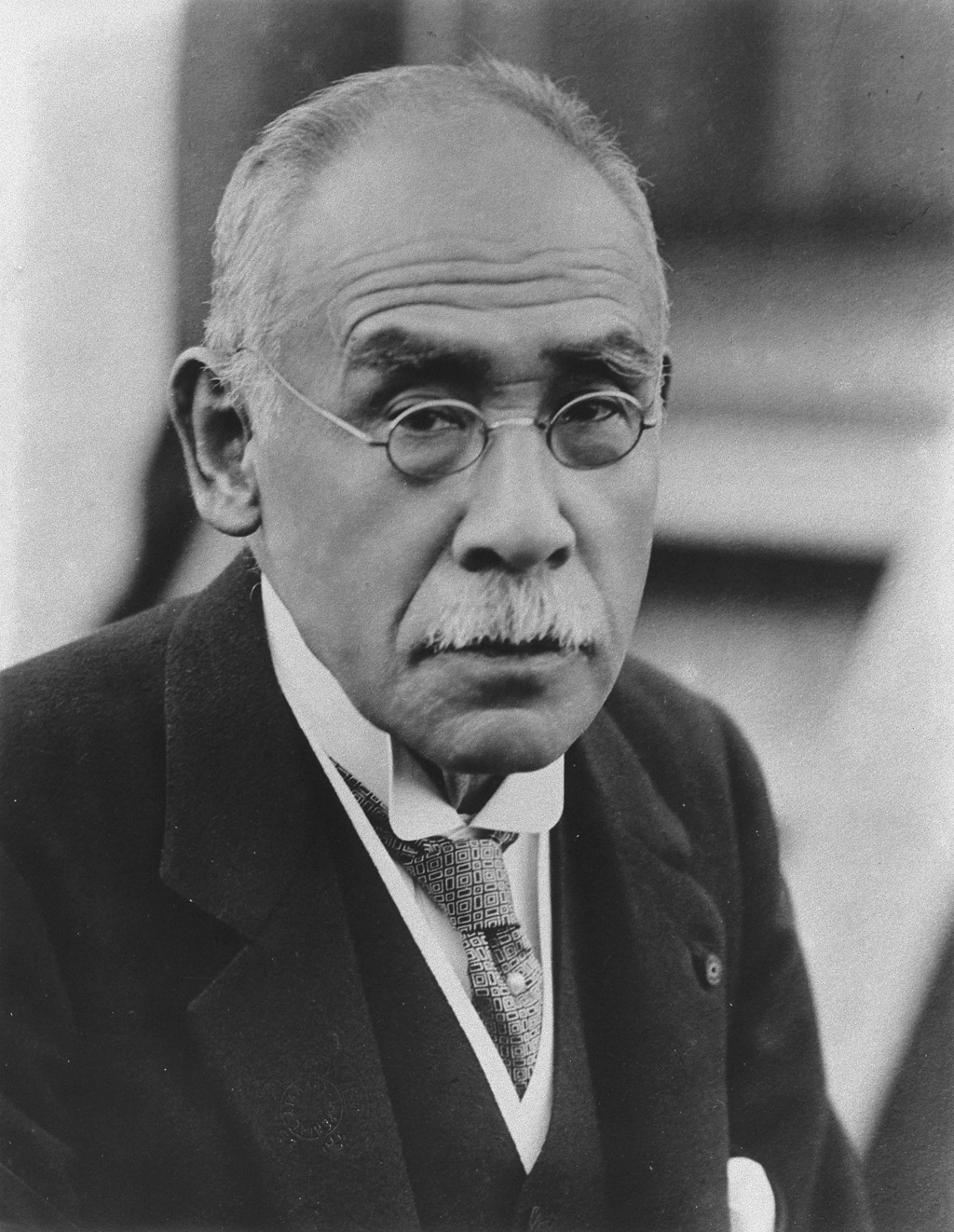

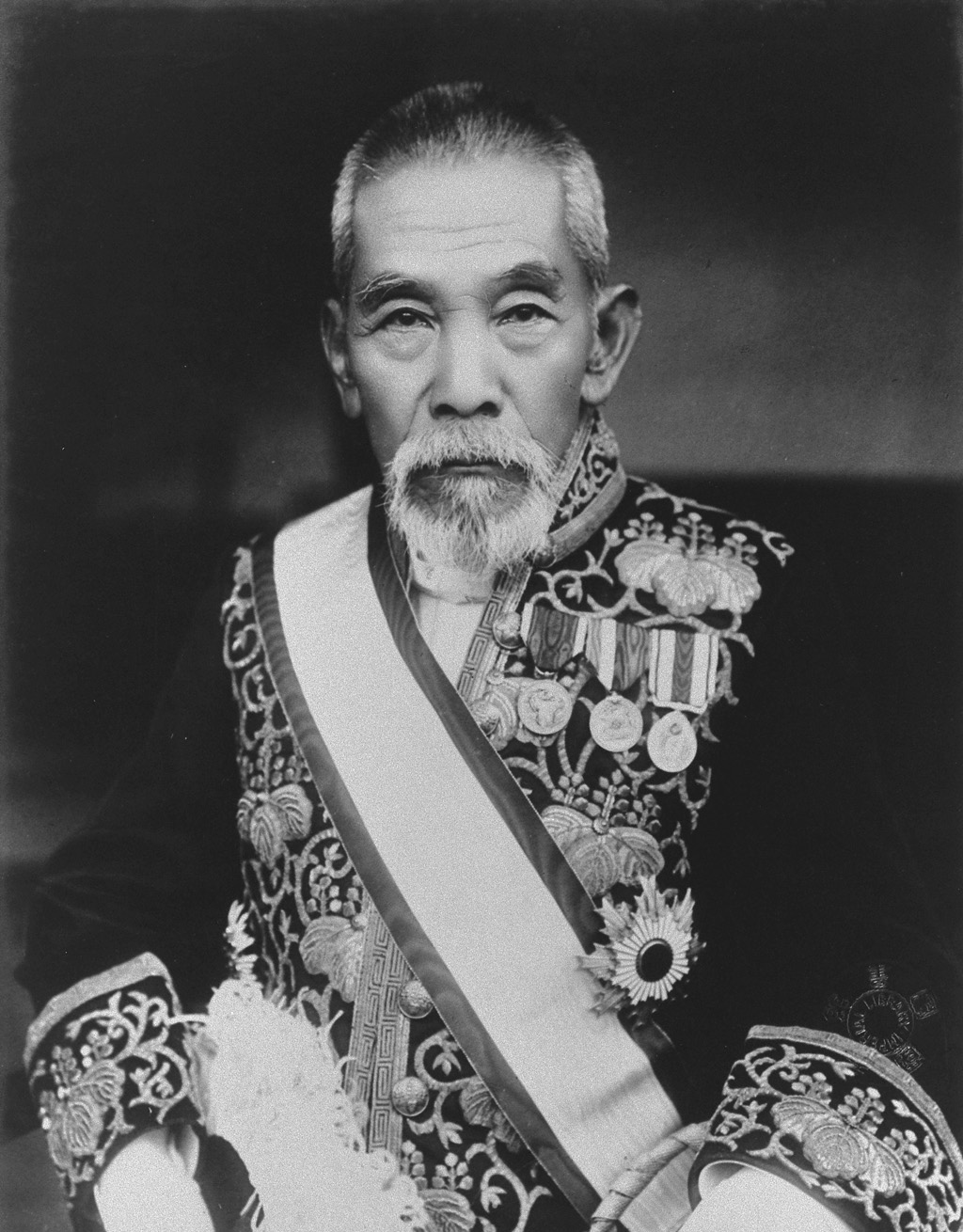
	First party	Second party	Third party
Leader	Hara Takashi	Kato Takaaki	Inukai Tsuyoshi
Party	Rikken Seiyūkai	Kenseikai	Rikken Kokumintō
Last election	31.54%, 108 seats	51.63%, 213 seats (Note: Rikken Dōshikai, Rikken Kokumintō and Chūseikai)	7.51%, 27 seats
Seats won	165	121	35
Seat change	▲57	▼92	▲7
Popular vote	504,720	467,518	125,974
Percentage	38.80%	35.94%	9.68%
Swing	▲7.27pp	▼15.69pp	▲2.17pp
Prime Minister before election
Terauchi Masatake
Independent
Prime Minister after election
Terauchi Masatake
Independent

General elections were held in Japan on 20 April 1917. The Rikken Seiyūkai party led by Hara Takashi emerged as the largest party in the House of Representatives, winning 165 of the 381 seats.

== Electoral system ==
The 381 members of the House of Representatives were elected in 51 multi-member constituencies based on prefectures and cities. Voting was restricted to men aged over 25 who paid at least 10 yen a year in direct taxation.

== Results ==
Party	Votes	%	Seats	+/–
Rikken Seiyūkai	504,720	38.80	165	+57
Kenseikai	467,518	35.94	121	–92
Rikken Kokumintō	125,974	9.68	35	+8
Others	202,640	15.58	60	+12
Total	1,300,852	100.00	381	0
Valid votes	1,300,852	99.52		
Invalid/blank votes	6,321	0.48		
Total votes	1,307,173	100.00		
Registered voters/turnout	1,422,126	91.92		
Source: Mackie & Rose, Statistics Bureau of Japan
