= Lansing–Ishii Agreement =

1917 agreement between Japan and the United States

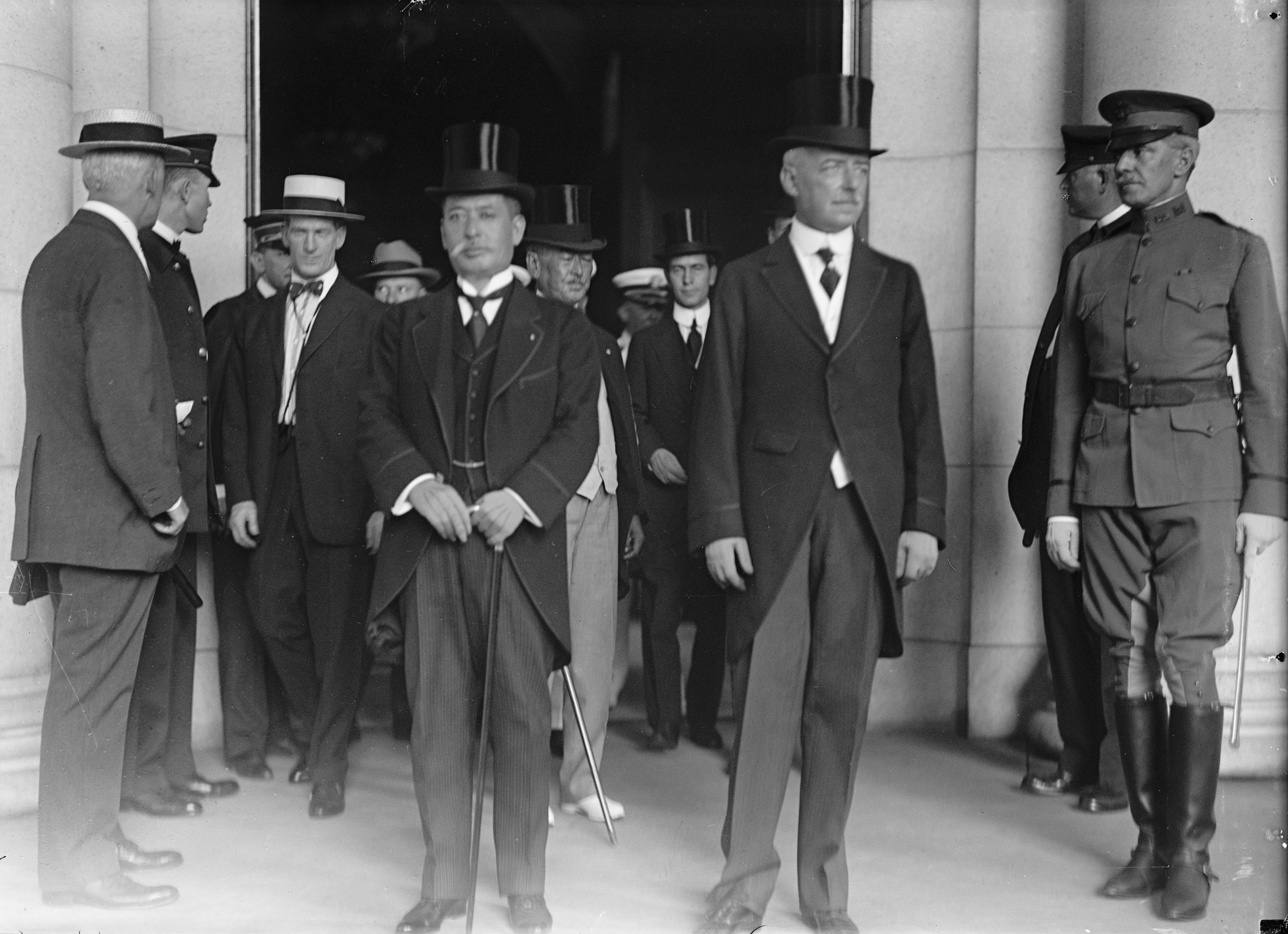
Viscount Ishii Kikujirō, Japanese special envoy, with United States Secretary of State Robert Lansing in Washington, in 1917 for the signing of the Lansing–Ishii Agreement

The Lansing–Ishii Agreement (石井・ランシング協定, Ishii-Ranshingu Kyōtei) was a diplomatic note signed in Washington between the United States and Imperial Japan on 2 November 1917 over their disputes with regard to China. Both parties agreed to respect the independence and territorial integrity of China and to follow the principle of equal opportunity for commerce and industry in that country. The United States recognized Japan had special interests in certain areas, especially Manchuria. The Chinese objected to the agreement and it was abrogated in 1923.

In a secret protocol, which was attached to the public agreement, both parties agreed not to take advantage of the special opportunities presented by World War I to seek special rights or privileges in China at the expense of other nations that had been allied in the war effort against Germany.

At the time, the Lansing–Ishii Agreement was touted as evidence that Japan and the United States had laid to rest their increasingly-acrimonious rivalry over China, and the agreement was hailed as a landmark in Japanese–American relations. However, critics soon realized that the vagueness and the differing possible interpretations of the agreement meant that nothing had really been decided after two months of talks. The agreement was abrogated in April 1923, when it was replaced by the Nine-Power Treaty.

For the Japanese, the Lansing–Ishii Agreement acknowledged Tokyo's special interests in part of China and recognized that Japan could not easily be ignored in international affairs.

== See also ==
- Japan–United States relations
- Taft–Katsura Agreement

== Bibliography ==
- Bagby, Wesley M (1970). America's International Relations since World War I. Oxford University Press. ISBN 0-19-512389-1.
- Beers, Burton F. Vain Endeavor. Robert Lansing's Attempts to End the American-Japanese Rivalry (1962)
- Tuchman, Barbara (2001). Stillwell and the American Experience in China, 1911–1945. Grove Press. ISBN 0-8021-3852-7.
- Walker, William O. (2009). National Security and Core Values in American History. Cambridge University Press. ISBN 0-521-74010-X.
- Vinson, J. Chal. "The Annulment of the Lansing-Ishii Agreement." Pacific Historical Review (1958): 57–69. Online
- Young, C. Walter. The International Legal Status Of The Kwantung Leased Territory (1931) online
