= Shigeru Morita =

Japanese painter (1907–2009)

- 森田茂
- Born: 30 March 1907; Makabe District, Imperial Japan
- Died: 2 March 2009 (aged 101); St. Luke's International Hospital, Tokyo, Japan
- Education: Ibaraki University
- Occupation: Painter
- Years active: 1934–2009
- Awards: Order of Culture

Shigeru Morita (Japanese: 森田茂, romanized: Morita Shigeru; 30 March 1907 – 2 March 2009) was a Japanese oil painter. His works were mainly centered on western-style paintings, and were exhibited multiple times across his career.

== Biography ==
=== Early life and education ===
Morita was born in the Makabe district of Ibaraki Prefecture in the Japanese empire on 3 March 1907. He attended the Shimodate boys junior high school in 1913. Due to his father's work, he moved frequently between Tokyo and Shimodate. In 1917, he moved with his parents to Osaka and started studying at the Daiichi Nishinoda elementary school. In 1919, he transferred to the Osaka prefectural Imamiya Junior High School, transferring again one year later, this time to the Tochigi prefectural Utsunomiya Junior High School. That year, he started oil painting. After attending the Ibaraki Normal School in 1924, he started working as a teacher at the Ota junior high school in 1925.

=== Artistic career ===
In 1926, one of his paintings was selected for the third Hakugakai art exhibition. The same year, he talked to Yoshihiko Kumaoka, who encouraged him to move to Tokyo. In 1928, he quit his job at the Ota junior high school and moved to Tokyo, where he started working in an elementary school. In 1930, one of his paintings was selected to be exposed at the seventh Enjusha art exhibition, and one year later, another one of his paintings was chosen for the eight Enjusha art exhibition. In 1931, he enrolled at the Kumaoka western painting institute. Multiple of his works in the 1930s were shown across multiple exhibitions, notably the first Tōkō exhibition and the Imperial Art Exhibition. In 1946, he was selected for the second Japanese art exhibit, an exhibit in which he has presented artwork ever since. In 1976, he became a member of the Japanese art academy, and in 1982, he became an advisor for the Nitten. Morita was awarded the Order of Culture in 1993.

=== Death ===
Morita continued painting during his final years. He died from pneumonia at the St. Luke's Hospital in Tokyo on 2 March 2009 at the age of 101.
