= Hara Takashi =

Prime Minister of Japan from 1918 to 1921

Senior Second Rank Hara Takashi
- 原 敬
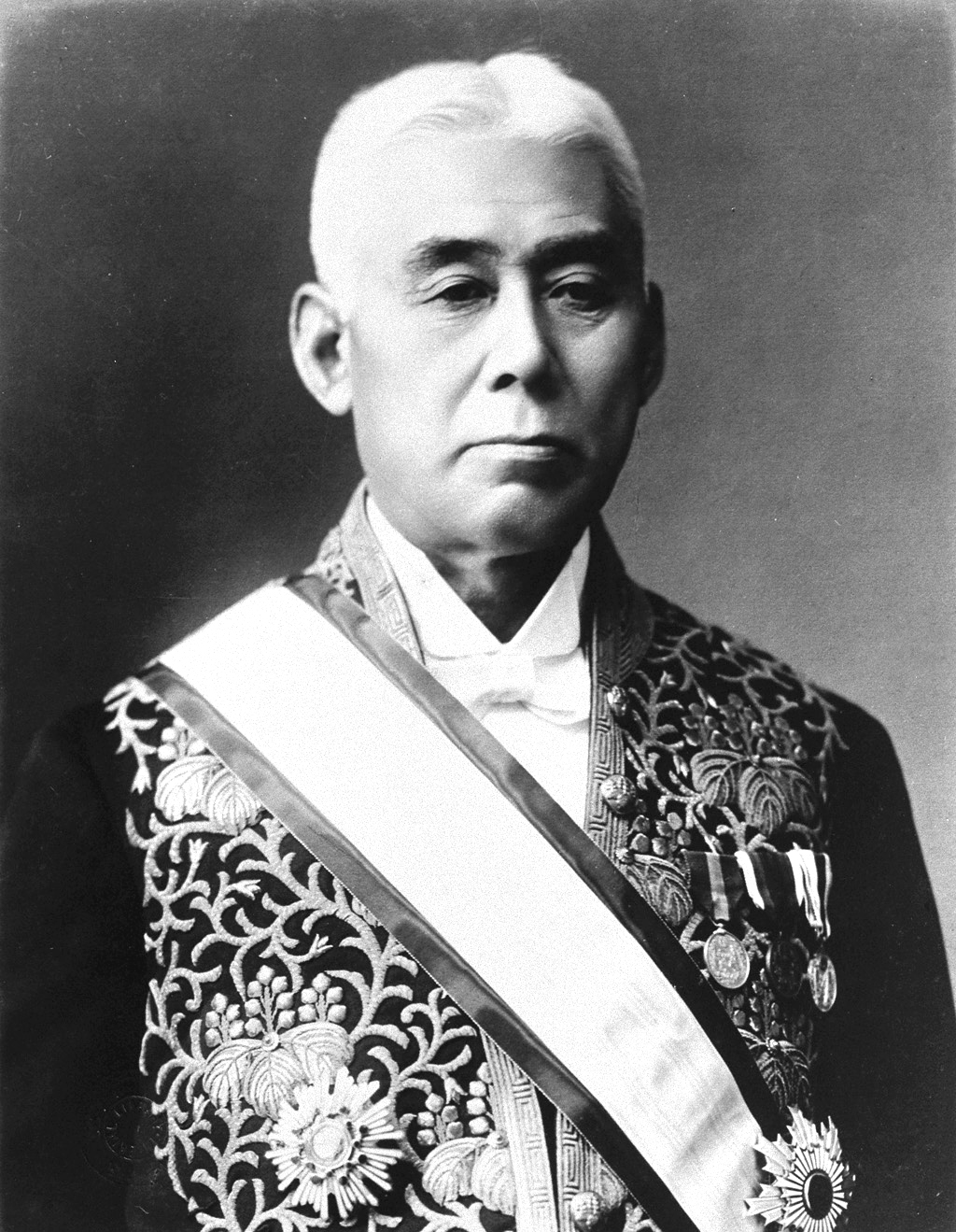

Prime Minister of Japan
- In office 29 September 1918 – 4 November 1921
- Monarch: Taishō
- Preceded by: Terauchi Masatake
- Succeeded by: Uchida Kōsai (acting); Takahashi Korekiyo

President of the Rikken Seiyūkai
- In office 18 June 1914 – 4 November 1921
- Preceded by: Saionji Kinmochi
- Succeeded by: Takahashi Korekiyo
Ministerial offices
Minister of Justice
In office 29 September 1918 – 15 May 1920
Prime Minister	Himself
Preceded by	Itasu Matsumuro
Succeeded by	Enkichi Ōki
Minister of Home Affairs
In office 20 February 1913 – 16 April 1914
Prime Minister	Yamamoto Gonnohyōe
Preceded by	Ōura Kanetake
Succeeded by	Ōkuma Shigenobu
In office 30 August 1911 – 21 December 1912
Prime Minister	Saionji Kinmochi
Preceded by	Hirata Tosuke
Succeeded by	Ōura Kanetake
In office 7 January 1906 – 14 July 1908
Prime Minister	Saionji Kinmochi
Preceded by	Kiyoura Keigo
Succeeded by	Hirata Tosuke
Minister of Communications
In office 14 January 1908 – 25 March 1908
Prime Minister	Saionji Kinmochi
Preceded by	Yamagata Isaburō
Succeeded by	Hotta Masayasu
In office 22 December 1900 – 2 June 1901
Prime Minister	Itō Hirobumi
Preceded by	Hoshi Tōru
Succeeded by	Yoshikawa Akimasa

Member of the House of Representatives
- In office 10 August 1902 – 4 November 1921
- Preceded by: Constituency established
- Succeeded by: Umatarō Ōya
- Constituency: Morioka City (1902–1920); Iwate 1st (1920–1921)

Personal details
- Born: 15 March 1856 Motomiya, Mutsu, Japan
- Died: 4 November 1921 (aged 65) Chiyoda, Tokyo, Japan
- Cause of death: Stab wounds
- Party: Rikken Seiyūkai (1900–1921)
- Other political affiliations: Rikken Teiseitō (1882–1883); Rikken Kaishintō (1883–1896)
- Spouse: Hara Asako (m. 1908)
- Education: Imperial University (Incomplete)
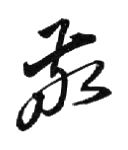
- Signature

Japanese name
- Kanji: 原 敬
- Hiragana: はら たかし
Transcriptions
- Romanization: Hara Takashi

Hara Takashi (原 敬; 15 March 1856 – 4 November 1921), informally known as Hara Kei, was a Japanese politician who served as the Prime Minister of Japan from 1918 until his assassination. Hara was the first commoner and first Christian appointed to be Prime Minister of Japan, and was given the moniker of "commoner prime minister" (平民宰相, heimin saishō).

Hara held several minor ambassadorial roles before rising through the ranks of the Rikken Seiyūkai and being elected to the House of Representatives. Hara served as Home Minister in several cabinets under Saionji Kinmochi and Yamamoto Gonnohyōe between 1906 and 1913. Hara was appointed prime minister following the Rice Riots of 1918 and positioned himself as a moderate, participating in the Paris Peace Conference, founding the League of Nations, and relaxing oppressive policies in Japanese Korea. Hara's premiership oversaw the Siberian intervention and the suppression of the March 1st Movement in Japanese-occupied Korea. Hara was assassinated by Nakaoka Kon'ichi, a far-right nationalist, on 4 November 1921.

== Early life ==
Hara Takashi was born on 15 March 1856 in Motomiya, a village near Morioka, Mutsu Province, into a samurai family in service of the Nanbu Domain. Hara's family had resisted the Meiji Restoration in 1868 and fought against the establishment of the very government which Hara himself would one day lead. Hara was an outsider in Japanese politics due to his association with a former enemy clan of the new Imperial Government, which at the time was dominated by the former clans of Chōshū and Satsuma domains.

Hara left home at the age of 15 and moved to Tokyo by boat. Hara failed the entrance examination of the prestigious Imperial Japanese Naval Academy, and instead joined the Marin Seminary, a free parochial school established by the French. It was here that he learned to speak French language fluently. Soon after that, Hara joined the law school of the Ministry of Justice (later University of Tokyo), but left without graduating to take responsibility for a student protest against the school's room and board policy. At the age of 17, Hara was baptized as a Catholic, taking on "David" as his baptismal name. Even though it was speculated that Hara became Christian for personal gain at the time, he remained a Christian in public life until the day he died. At the age of 19, Hara chose to classify himself as a commoner (平民, heimin) rather than his family's status as shizoku (士族), a distinction for former samurai families who were not made into kazoku (華族; aristocratic peers). At various times later in his political career, offers were made to raise his rank, but Hara refused them every time on the basis that it would alienate himself from the common men and limit his ability to gain entrance to the House of Representatives. Beginning in 1879, Hara worked as a newspaper reporter for three years, but quit his job in protest over efforts of his editors to make the newspaper a mouthpiece for the Rikken Kaishintō, a political party led by Ōkuma Shigenobu.

== Political career ==
In 1882, Hara took a position in the Ministry of Foreign Affairs at the request of Inoue Kaoru, the Foreign Minister at the time. Based on discussions Hara had with him on his views for the future of Japanese politics during a trip both men took to Korea in 1884, Inoue appointed Hara to become consul-general in Tianjin, and the first secretary to the embassy of Japan in Paris. Hara served as Vice-minister of Foreign Affairs and as ambassador to Korea under Mutsu Munemitsu. He then left the Foreign Ministry to work as a journalist for several years, and became the manager of a newspaper company, the Mainichi Shimbun based in Osaka.

In 1900, Hara returned to politics and joined Itō Hirobumi's newly founded Rikken Seiyūkai, becoming the first secretary-general of the party.

Hara ran successfully for the House of Representatives as a representative from his native Iwate Prefecture and was appointed Minister of Communications in the Fourth Ito Administration. Hara later served as Home Minister in several cabinets between 1906 and 1913, a powerful position that made it able for him to effect many reforms. Hara realized that a fundamental political issue in Japan was the tension between the elected government and the appointed bureaucracy, and his career was dedicated to weakening the power of the non-elected bureaucrats. As Home Minister, Hara tried to implement meritocracy by systematically dismissing local bureaucrats in local governments in every capacity from governors down to high school principals. Any public employee who fell under his power would be replaced by someone in whom he saw real ability instead of a mere useful recipient of a favor or nepotism. Thus, Hara created a system in which people with talent could rise to the top of the bureaucracy, regardless of their background or rank. Hara also understood that maintenance of the supremacy of the elected leaders depended on the government's ability to develop the Japanese national infrastructure and on a long-term economic plan that would address regional as well as national interests.

In 1914, after heated debate, Hara was appointed the president of the Rikken Seiyūkai to replace the outgoing leader, Saionji Kinmochi. Under Hara's leadership, Rikken Seiyūkai first lost its majority control of the Diet in the 1915 general elections, but regained its majority in the 1917 general elections.

== Premiership (1918–1921) ==
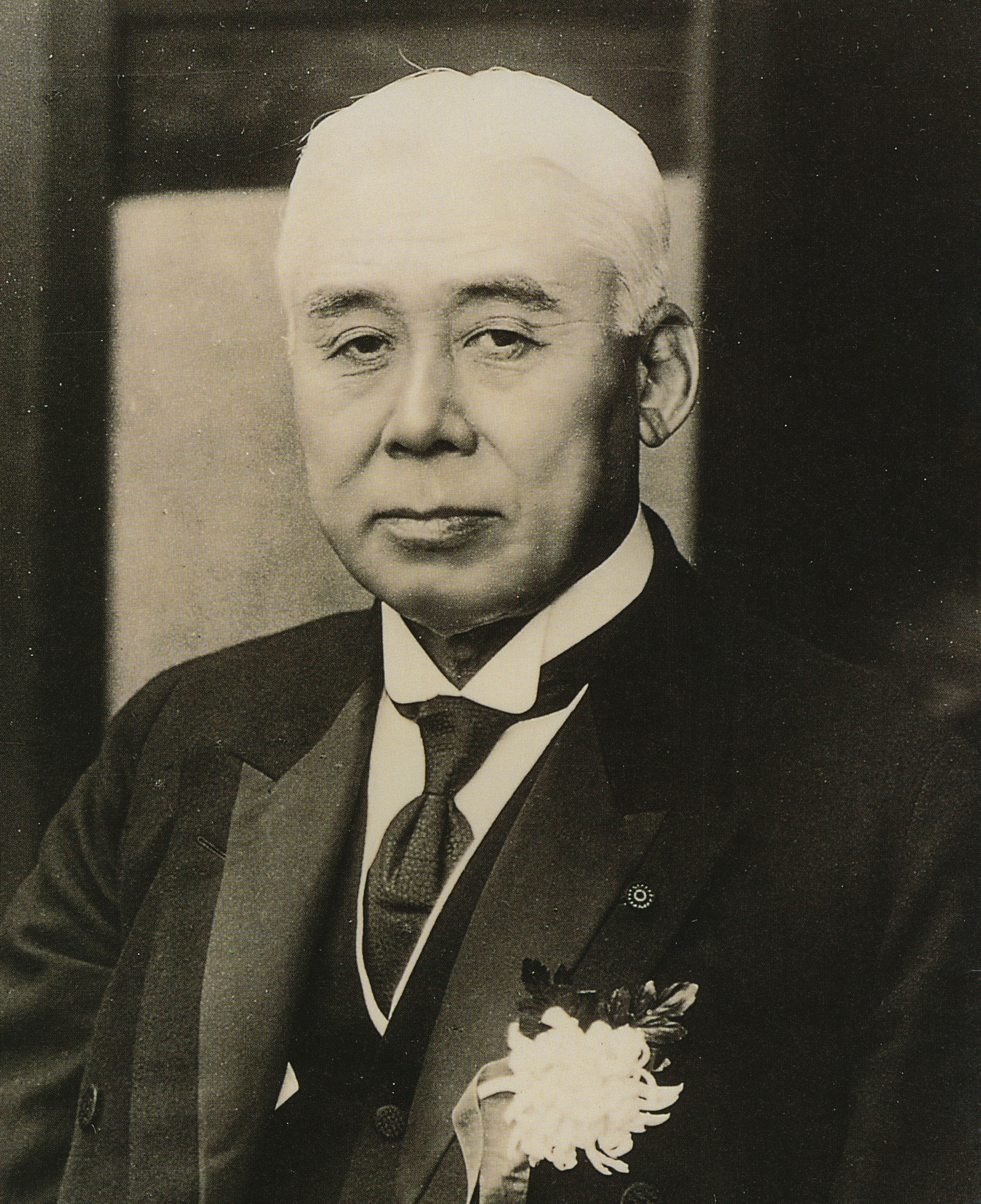
- Hara during his premiership
- Premiership of Hara Takashi; 29 September 1918 – 4 November 1921
- Monarch: Emperor Taishō
- Cabinet: Hara Cabinet
- Party: Rikken Seiyūkai
- Election: 1920
- Seat: Naikaku Sōri Daijin Kantei
- Constituency: Morioka
- Emblem of the Government of Japan

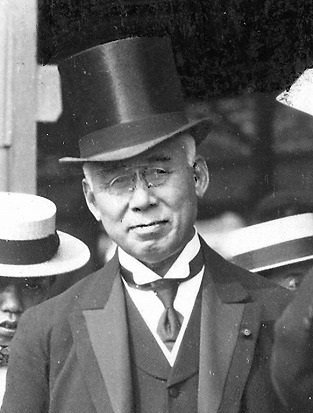
Hara Takashi during his premiership

In 1918, Prime Minister Terauchi Masatake fell from office as a result of the Rice Riots of 1918, and Hara was appointed as his successor on 28 September. It was the first cabinet headed by a commoner. Also, Hara was the first civilian in Japanese history to become the administrative chief of any of the armed services, when he temporarily took charge of the Navy Ministry, in absence of the Navy Minister, Admiral Katō Tomosaburō, who was serving as the Japanese representative at the Washington Naval Conference.

As prime minister, Hara suffered in terms of popularity, because he refused to use his majority in the lower house to force through universal suffrage legislation. Hara's cautious approach disappointed communists and socialists, who accused him of delaying universal suffrage as it would endanger his position in power. As a party politician, Hara had never been the favorite of the conservatives, bureaucrats and military, and he was widely despised by the ultranationalists. During his term of office, Japan participated in the Paris Peace Conference, and joined the League of Nations as a founding member. In Korea, Japan used military force to suppress the Samil Rebellion, but later began more lenient policies aimed at reducing opposition to Japanese rule. Particularly following the Samil Uprising, Hara pursued a conciliatory policy towards colonies, particularly Korea. Hara arranged for his political ally, Saitō Makoto, a political moderate, to take over as Governor-General of Korea; he instituted a colonial administration consisting mainly of civilians rather than military; and he permitted a degree of cultural freedom for Koreans, including (for the first time) a school curriculum that featured Korean language and history. Hara also sought to encourage a limited amount of self-rule in Korea – provided that, ultimately, Koreans remained under Japanese imperial control. His overtures, however, won few supporters either among Koreans or Japanese; the former considered them inadequate, the latter considered them excessive.

Hara oversaw most of the Siberian intervention, which led to growing antagonism between the government and the military.

Of Hara's supposedly proactive policies, most were directed toward politicians, merchants, and conglomerates. In addition, there are some differences in the evaluation of Hara's policies before and after his inauguration, such as the repeated incidents of jail charges and his negative attitude toward the implementation of the universal suffrage law, which was the people's great desire.

== Assassination ==
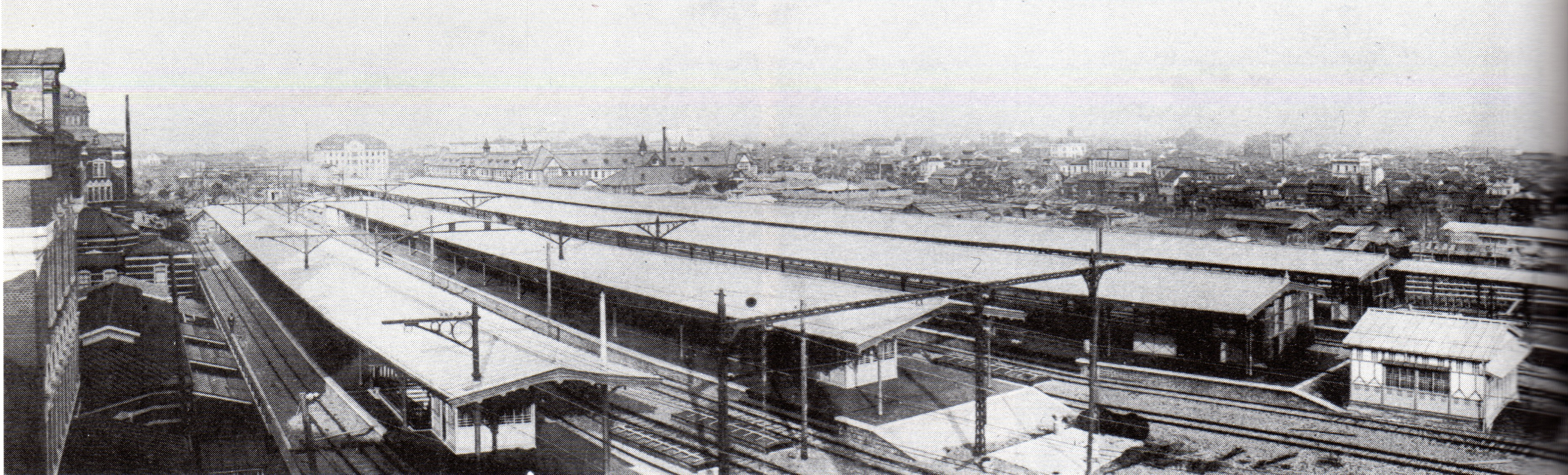
Tōkyō Station in 1914

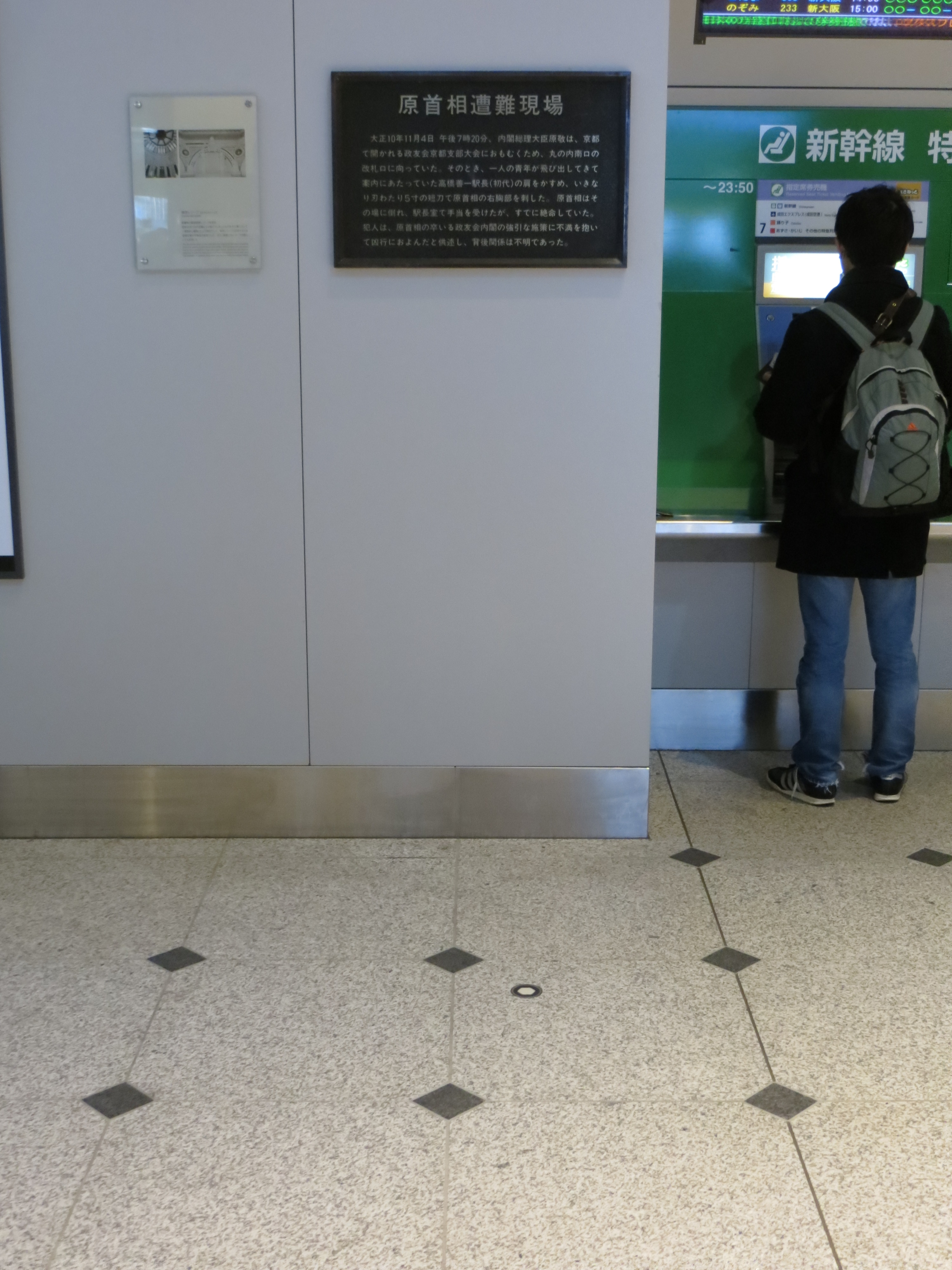
Site of the assassination, Tōkyō Station Marunouchi South Entrance

On 4 November 1921, Hara was stabbed to death by Nakaoka Kon'ichi, a right-wing nationalist railroad switchman, at Tokyo Station while catching a train to Kyoto for a party conference. Nakaoka's motives for assassinating Hara were his beliefs that Hara was corrupt, involving the zaibatsu in Japanese politics, going to pass universal suffrage, and his handling of the Nikolayevsk incident during the Siberian intervention a year earlier. Nakaoka was also influenced by his boss, who was a vocal opponent of Hara. Nakaoka was found guilty of murder. Prosecutors sought a death sentence, but Nakaoka was instead sentenced to life imprisonment. In 1934, he was released as part of a general amnesty issued by the Emperor to mark the birth of the Crown Prince, after which he emigrated to Manchuria.

Hara was replaced by Uchida Kōsai as acting prime minister until Uchida was replaced a week later by Takahashi Korekiyo.

As opposed to many of his contemporaries, Hara lived a relatively simple lifestyle in a rented home near Shiba Park in downtown Tokyo. In his will, he left very few assets behind but among these was his diary, stating that "After a period of some years my diary must be made public. It is the most valuable of all my possessions, so it must be protected." According to the will, Hara's diary was made public and what came to be called the Hara Diary (原日記, Hara Nikki) turned out to be one of the most valuable first hand accounts of the political scene in that era. Most of his daily activities are written along with opinions and thoughts regarding the political figures of the time. Hara's diary itself is thousands of pages long and reveals, in depth, a broad range of information previously unknown to historians.

== Honors ==
From the corresponding article in the Japanese Wikipedia

=== Japanese ===
- Order of the Sacred Treasure, Fifth Class (28 December 1893)
- Grand Cordon of the Order of the Rising Sun (4 April 1914; Third Class: 16 June 1896)
- Grand Cordon of the Order of the Rising Sun with Paulownia Flowers (7 September 1920)
- Grand Cordon of the Order of the Chrysanthemum (4 November 1921; posthumous)

=== Foreign ===
- Belgium: Commander of the Order of Leopold (7 July 1888)
- Spain: Knight Grand Cross of the Order of Isabella the Catholic (26 October 1896)

== Bibliography ==
- Najita, Tetsuo: Hara Kei in the Politics of Compromise 1905–1915. Harvard Univ. Press, 1967.
- Olson, L. A.: Hara Kei – A Political Biography. Ph.D.diss. Harvard University, 1954.
- Duus, Peter: Party Rivalry and Political Change in Taisho Japan. Cambridge/Mass.: Harvard University Press, 1968.

Political offices
Preceded by Terauchi Masatake	Prime Minister of Japan; 29 September 1918 – 15 May 1921	Succeeded by Uchida Kōsai acting
Preceded by Matsumuro Itasu	Justice Minister (acting); 29 September 1918 – 15 May 1920	Succeeded by Enkichi Ōki
Preceded by Ōura Kanetake	Home Minister; 20 February 1913 – 16 April 1914	Succeeded by Ōkuma Shigenobu
Preceded by Hirata Tosuke	Home Minister; 30 August 1911 – 21 December 1912	Succeeded by Ōura Kanetake
Preceded by Yamagata Isaburō	Communications Minister (acting); 14 January 1908 – 25 March 1908	Succeeded by Hotta Masayasu
Preceded by Kiyoura Keigo	Home Minister; 7 January 1906 – 14 July 1908	Succeeded by Hirata Tosuke
Preceded by Hoshi Tōru	Communications Minister; 22 December 1900 – 2 June 1901	Succeeded by Yoshikawa Akimasa
