= Chūseikai =

Political party in Japan

The Chūseikai (Japanese: 中正会, lit. Impartiality Society) was a political party in Japan.

== History ==
The party was established on December 19, 1913, as a merger of Ekirakukai and Seiyū Club and initially had 37 MPs. It temporarily adopted "Ekiseikai" as its name before settling down on "Chūseikai" on December 24. It supported Ōkuma Shigenobu's government from 1914 until 1916, with party member Yukio Ozaki appointed Minister of Justice. In the 1915 general elections it won 33 seats, and in October 1916 it merged into the new Kenseikai party.
