= Sakuye Takahashi =

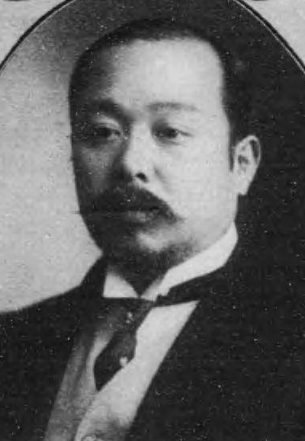
Sakuye Takahashi

Sakuye Takahashi (高橋 作衛 also spelled Sakuya Takahashi or Sakuyei Takahashi, b. ca. 1865 - d. September 12, 1920) was a Japanese expert on international law.

During the First Sino-Japanese War, he served as legal adviser for the Imperial Japanese Navy, and in that capacity tried to refute the allegations regarding massacre at Port Arthur. During the Russo-Japanese War he served as legal adviser for the Japanese Ministry of Foreign Affairs. He also served as professor of law at Tokyo Imperial University and as chief editor of Japanese Review of International Law and Diplomacy.

Under the cabinet of Prime Minister Ōkuma Shigenobu, he served as Director of the Bureau of Legislation, and was charged with coordination on legislative affairs between government and parliament.

He translated Japanese materials into English.

== Works (partial list) ==
- Cases in International Law during the Chino-Japanese War (Cambridge, 1899)
- International Law Applied to the Russo-Japanese War (London, 1908)
