= First Katsura cabinet =

Japanese cabinet from 1901 to 1906

First Katsura Cabinet
- 11th Cabinet of Japan
- 1901–1906
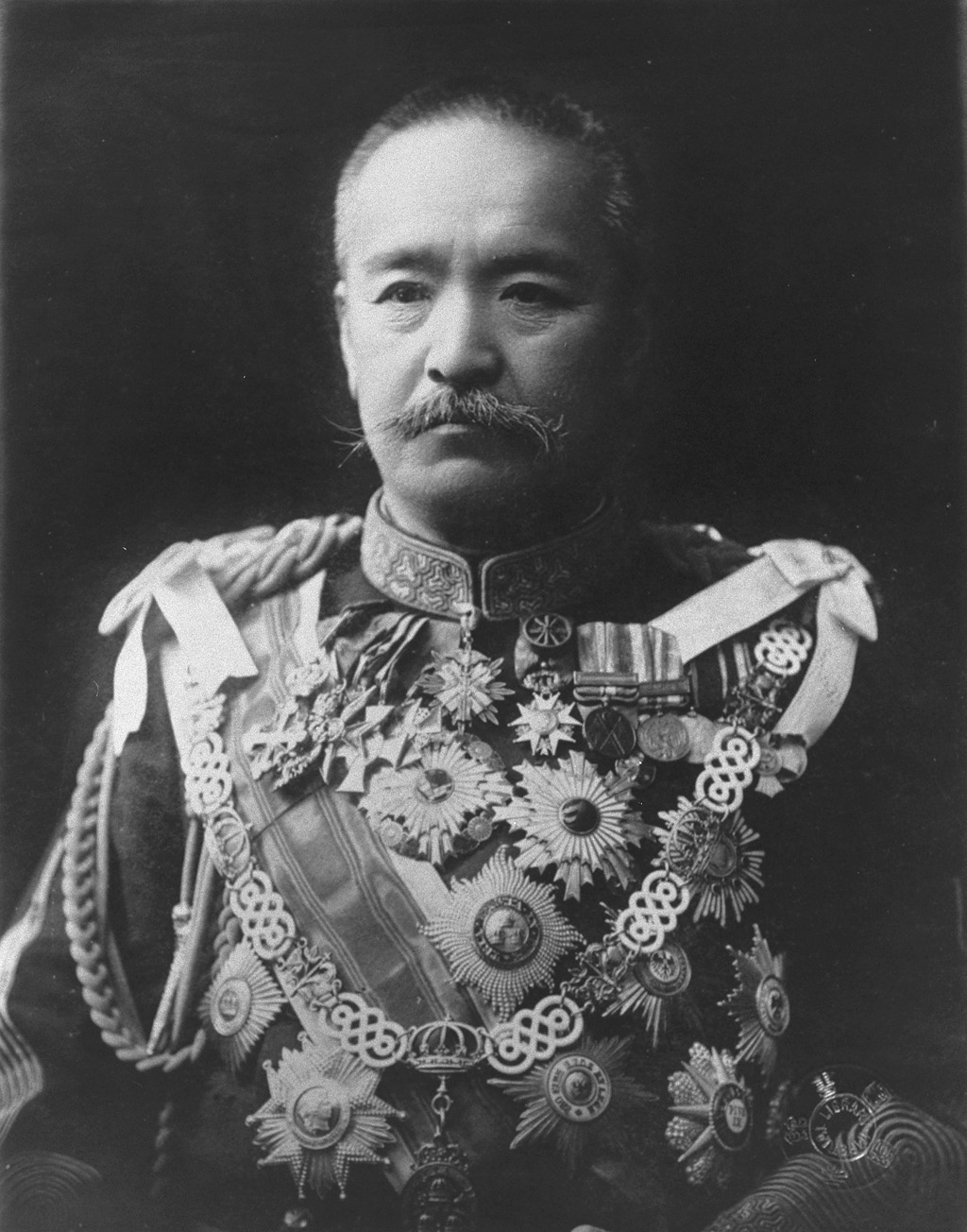
- Prime Minister Katsura Tarō
- Date formed: June 2, 1901
- Date dissolved: January 7, 1906

People and organisations
- Emperor: Meiji
- Prime Minister: Katsura Tarō

History
- Elections: 1902 general election 1903 general election 1904 general election
- Legislature terms: August 1898–1902; 1902–1903; 1903–1904; 1904–1908
- Predecessor: Fourth Itō Cabinet
- Successor: First Saionji Cabinet

The First Katsura Cabinet is the 11th Cabinet of Japan led by Katsura Tarō from June 2, 1901, to January 7, 1906.

== Cabinet ==
First Katsura Cabinet
Portfolio	Minister	Political party	Term start	Term end
Prime Minister	Count Katsura Tarō	Military (Army)	June 2, 1901	January 7, 1906
Minister for Foreign Affairs	Baron Sone Arasuke	Independent	June 2, 1901	September 21, 1901
Minister for Foreign Affairs	Baron Komura Jutarō	Independent	September 21, 1901	January 7, 1906
Minister of Home Affairs	Baron Utsumi Tadakatsu	Independent	June 2, 1901	July 15, 1903
Minister of Home Affairs	Baron Kodama Gentarō	Military (Army)	July 15, 1903	October 12, 1903
Minister of Home Affairs	Count Katsura Tarō	Military (Army)	October 12, 1903	February 20, 1904
Minister of Home Affairs	Viscount Yoshikawa Akimasa	Independent	February 20, 1904	September 16, 1905
Minister of Home Affairs	Baron Kiyoura Keigo	Kenkyūkai	September 16, 1905	January 7, 1906
Minister of Finance	Baron Sone Arasuke	Independent	June 2, 1901	January 7, 1906
Minister of the Army	Baron Kodama Gentarō	Military (Army)	June 2, 1901	March 27, 1902
Minister of the Army	Terauchi Masatake	Military (Army)	March 27, 1902	January 7, 1906
Minister of the Navy	Yamamoto Gonnohyōe	Military (Navy)	June 2, 1901	January 7, 1906
Minister of Justice	Baron Kiyoura Keigo	Kenkyūkai	June 2, 1901	September 22, 1903
Minister of Justice	Hatano Norinao	Independent	September 22, 1903	January 7, 1906
Minister of Education	Baron Kikuchi Dairoku	Kenkyūkai	June 2, 1901	July 17, 1903
Minister of Education	Baron Kodama Gentarō	Military (Army)	July 17, 1903	September 22, 1903
Minister of Education	Kubota Yuzuru	Kenkyūkai	September 22, 1903	December 14, 1905
Minister of Education	Count Katsura Tarō	Military (Army)	December 14, 1905	January 7, 1906
Minister of Agriculture and Commerce	Baron Hirata Tosuke	Sawakai	June 2, 1901	July 17, 1903
Minister of Agriculture and Commerce	Baron Kiyoura Keigo	Kenkyūkai	July 17, 1903	January 7, 1906
Minister of Communications	Viscount Yoshikawa Akimasa	Independent	June 2, 1901	July 17, 1903
Minister of Communications	Baron Sone Arasuke	Independent	July 17, 1903	September 22, 1903
Minister of Communications	Ōura Kanetake	Independent	September 22, 1903	January 7, 1906
Chief Cabinet Secretary	Shibata Kamon	Independent	June 2, 1901	January 7, 1906
Director-General of the Cabinet Legislation Bureau	Okuda Yoshito	Independent	June 2, 1901	September 26, 1902
Director-General of the Cabinet Legislation Bureau	Ichiki Kitokurō	Independent	September 26, 1902	January 7, 1906

Preceded by Fourth Itō Cabinet	Cabinet of Japan; 1901–1906	Succeeded by First Saionji Cabinet
