= Fourth Itō cabinet =

Japanese cabinet from 1900 to 1901

Fourth Itō Cabinet
- 10th Cabinet of Japan
- 1900–1901
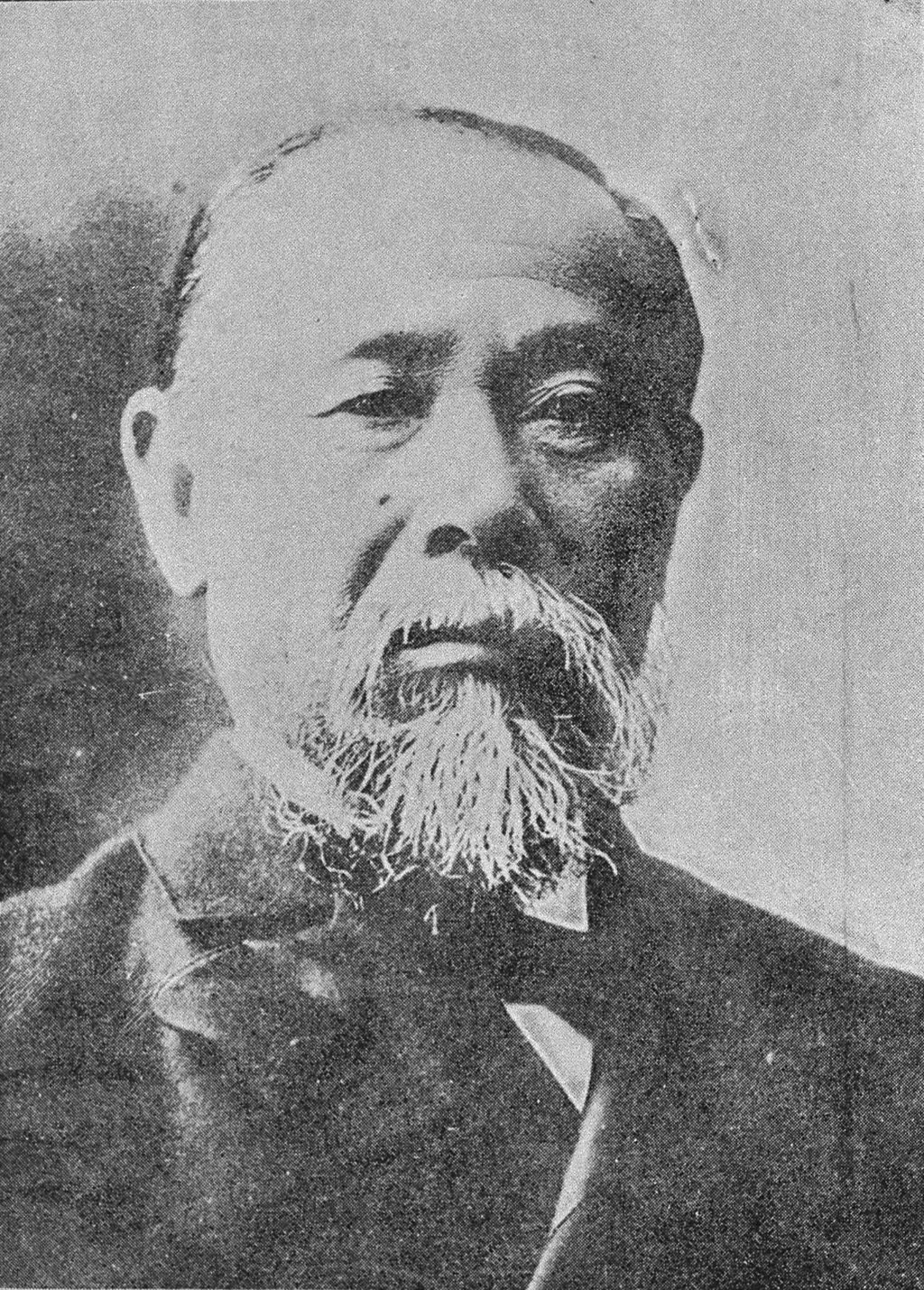
- Prime Minister Itō Hirobumi
- Date formed: October 19, 1900
- Date dissolved: June 2, 1901

People and organisations
- Emperor: Meiji
- Prime Minister: Itō Hirobumi; Saionji Kinmochi (acting)
- Member party: Rikken Seiyūkai

History
- Legislature term: August 1898–1902
- Predecessor: Second Yamagata Cabinet
- Successor: First Katsura Cabinet

The Fourth Itō Cabinet was the 10th Cabinet of Japan led by Itō Hirobumi from October 19, 1900, to June 2, 1901.

== Cabinet ==
Fourth Itō Cabinet
Portfolio	Minister	Political party	Term start	Term end
Prime Minister	Marquess Itō Hirobumi	Rikken Seiyūkai	October 19, 1900	May 10, 1901
Prime Minister	Marquess Saionji Kinmochi (acting)	Rikken Seiyūkai	October 27, 1900	December 12, 1900
Minister for Foreign Affairs	Katō Takaaki	Independent	October 19, 1900	May 10, 1901
Minister of Home Affairs	Baron Suematsu Kenchō	Rikken Seiyūkai	October 19, 1900	May 10, 1901
Minister of Finance	Viscount Watanabe Kunitake	Rikken Seiyūkai	October 19, 1900	May 10, 1901
Minister of the Army	Viscount Katsura Tarō	Military (Army)	October 19, 1900	December 23, 1900
Minister of the Army	Baron Kodama Gentarō	Military (Army)	December 23, 1900	May 10, 1901
Minister of the Navy	Yamamoto Gonnohyōe	Military (Navy)	October 19, 1900	May 10, 1901
Minister of Justice	Baron Kaneko Kentarō	Rikken Seiyūkai	October 19, 1900	May 10, 1901
Minister of Education	Matsuda Masahisa	Rikken Seiyūkai	October 19, 1900	May 10, 1901
Minister of Agriculture and Commerce	Hayashi Yūzō	Rikken Seiyūkai	October 19, 1900	May 10, 1901
Minister of Communications	Hoshi Tōru	Rikken Seiyūkai	October 19, 1900	December 22, 1900
Minister of Communications	Hara Takashi	Rikken Seiyūkai	December 22, 1900	May 10, 1901
Minister without portfolio	Marquess Saionji Kinmochi	Rikken Seiyūkai	October 27, 1900	May 10, 1901
Chief Cabinet Secretary	Samejima Takenosuke	Independent	October 27, 1900	May 10, 1901
Director-General of the Cabinet Legislation Bureau	Hirata Tosuke	Sawakai	October 19, 1900	October 24, 1900
Director-General of the Cabinet Legislation Bureau	Yoshito Okuda	Independent	October 24, 1900	May 10, 1901

Following Itō's resignation as Prime Minister on May 10, 1901, Saionji Kinmochi was acting Prime Minister from May 10, 1901, to June 2, 1901.

Portfolio	Minister	Political party	Term start	Term end
Prime Minister	Marquess Saionji Kinmochi (acting)	Rikken Seiyūkai	May 10, 1901	June 2, 1901
Minister for Foreign Affairs	Katō Takaaki	Independent	May 10, 1901	June 2, 1901
Minister of Home Affairs	Baron Suematsu Kenchō	Rikken Seiyūkai	May 10, 1901	June 2, 1901
Minister of Finance	Viscount Watanabe Kunitake	Rikken Seiyūkai	May 10, 1901	May 14, 1901
Minister of Finance	Marquess Saionji Kinmochi (acting)	Rikken Seiyūkai	May 14, 1901	June 2, 1901
Minister of the Army	Baron Kodama Gentarō	Military (Army)	May 10, 1901	June 2, 1901
Minister of the Navy	Yamamoto Gonnohyōe	Military (Navy)	May 10, 1901	June 2, 1901
Minister of Justice	Baron Kaneko Kentarō	Rikken Seiyūkai	May 10, 1901	June 2, 1901
Minister of Education	Matsuda Masahisa	Rikken Seiyūkai	May 10, 1901	June 2, 1901
Minister of Agriculture and Commerce	Hayashi Yūzō	Rikken Seiyūkai	May 10, 1901	June 2, 1901
Minister of Communications	Hara Takashi	Rikken Seiyūkai	May 10, 1901	June 2, 1901
Chief Cabinet Secretary	Samejima Takenosuke	Independent	May 10, 1901	June 2, 1901
Director-General of the Cabinet Legislation Bureau	Yoshito Okuda	Independent	May 10, 1901	June 2, 1901

Preceded by Second Yamagata Cabinet	Cabinet of Japan; 1900–1901	Succeeded by First Katsura Cabinet
