= Second Yamagata cabinet =

Japanese cabinet from 1898 to 1900

Second Yamagata Cabinet
- 9th Cabinet of Japan
- 1898–1900
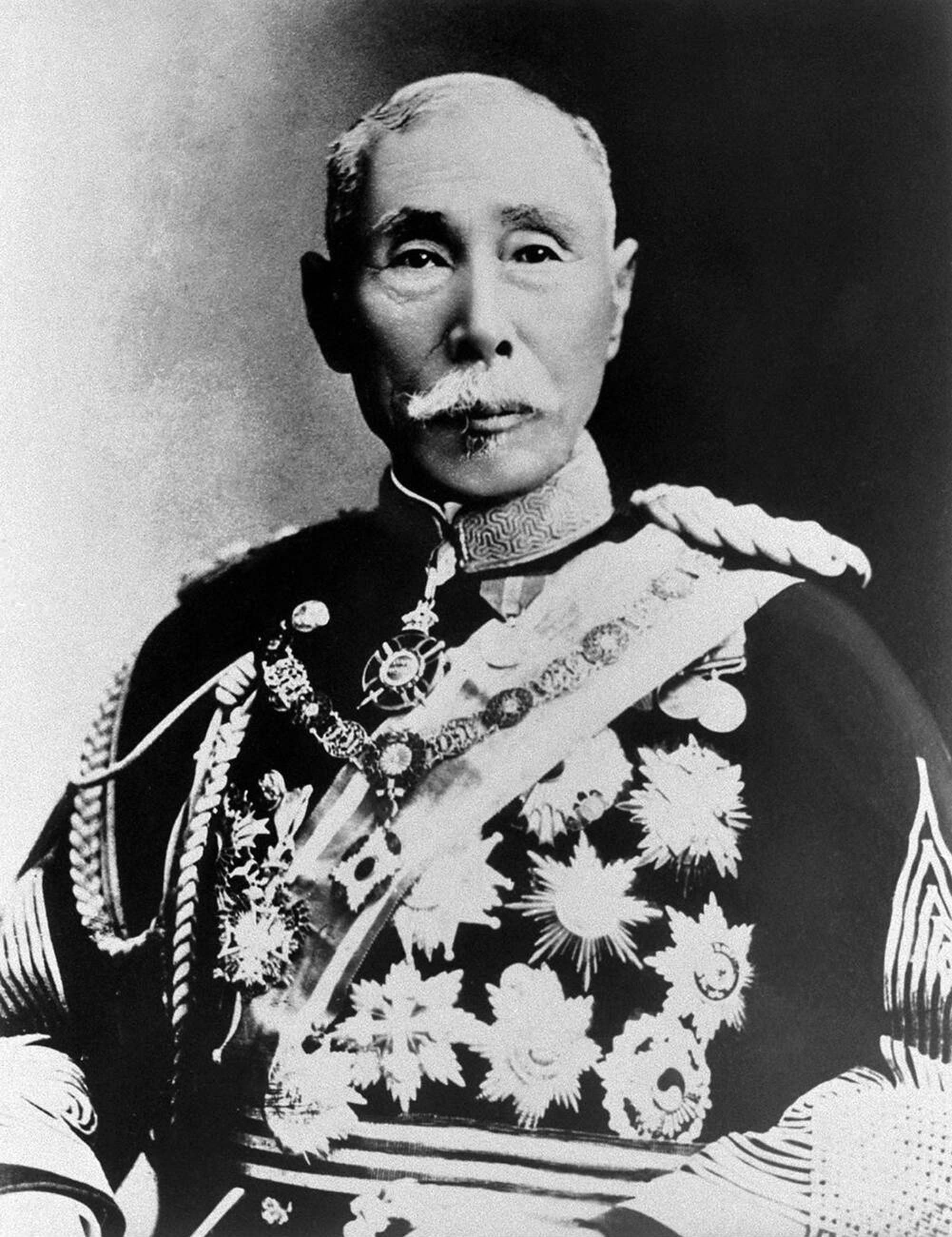
- Prime Minister Yamagata Aritomo
- Date formed: November 8, 1898
- Date dissolved: October 19, 1900

People and organisations
- Emperor: Meiji
- Prime Minister: Yamagata Aritomo

History
- Legislature term: August 1898–1902
- Predecessor: First Ōkuma Cabinet
- Successor: Fourth Itō Cabinet

The Second Yamagata Cabinet is the ninth Cabinet of Japan led by Yamagata Aritomo from November 8, 1898, to October 19, 1900.

== Cabinet ==
Second Yamagata Cabinet
Portfolio	Minister	Political party	Term start	Term end
Prime Minister	Marquess Yamagata Aritomo	Military (Army)	November 8, 1898	October 19, 1900
Minister for Foreign Affairs	Viscount Aoki Shūzō	Independent	November 8, 1898	October 19, 1900
Minister of Home Affairs	Marquess Saigō Jūdō	Military (Navy)	November 8, 1898	October 19, 1900
Minister of Finance	Count Matsukata Masayoshi	Independent	November 8, 1898	October 19, 1900
Minister of the Army	Viscount Katsura Tarō	Military (Army)	November 8, 1898	October 19, 1900
Minister of the Navy	Yamamoto Gonnohyōe	Military (Navy)	November 8, 1898	October 19, 1900
Minister of Justice	Kiyoura Keigo	Kenkyūkai	November 8, 1898	October 19, 1900
Minister of Education	Count Kabayama Sukenori	Military (Navy)	November 8, 1898	October 19, 1900
Minister of Agriculture and Commerce	Sone Arasuke	Independent	November 8, 1898	October 19, 1900
Minister of Communications	Viscount Yoshikawa Akimasa	Independent	November 8, 1898	October 19, 1900
Chief Cabinet Secretary	Yasuhiro Banichiro	Independent	November 8, 1898	October 19, 1900
Director-General of the Cabinet Legislation Bureau	Hirata Tosuke	Sawakai	November 8, 1898	October 19, 1900

Preceded by First Ōkuma Cabinet	Cabinet of Japan; 1898–1900	Succeeded by Fourth Itō Cabinet
