= Yamagata Cabinet =

Yamagata Cabinet may refer to:

- First Yamagata Cabinet, the Japanese government led by Yamagata Aritomo from 1889 to 1891
- Second Yamagata Cabinet, the Japanese government led by Yamagata Aritomo from 1898 to 1900
