= Gui Tai Lang =

Gui Tai Lang may refer to following Japanese individuals whose name can be transliterated to Kanji pronounced by Hanyu Pinyin:

- 桂太郎 (Gūi Tàiláng, 1848–1913), Japanese politician and general of the Imperial Japanese Army
- 鬼太郎 (Guǐ Tàiláng), a main character in Japanese manga GeGeGe no Kitarō
