= Yoshikawa Akimasa =

Japanese bureaucrat, statesman and cabinet minister

Junior First Rank Count Yoshikawa Akimasa
- 芳川 顕正
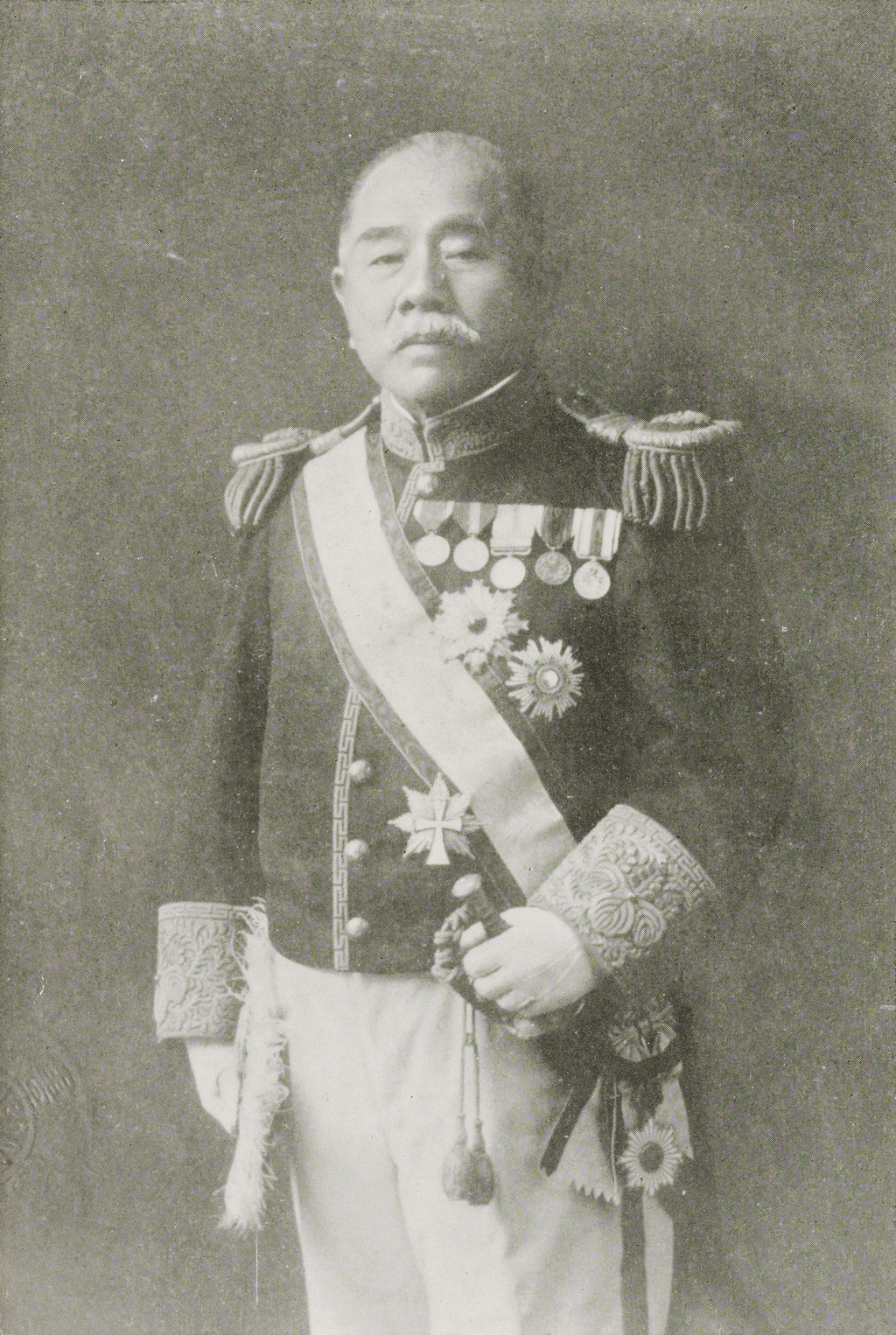

Vice President of the Privy Council
- In office 9 January 1912 – 20 March 1917
- Monarchs: Meiji; Taishō
- President: Yamagata Aritomo
- Preceded by: Higashikuze Michitomi
- Succeeded by: Kiyoura Keigo
Ministerial offices
Minister of Home Affairs
In office 20 February 1904 – 16 September 1905
Prime Minister	Katsura Tarō
Preceded by	Katsura Tarō
Succeeded by	Kiyoura Keigo
In office 12 January 1898 – 30 June 1898
Prime Minister	Itō Hirobumi
Preceded by	Kabayama Sukenori
Succeeded by	Itagaki Taisuke
In office 3 February 1896 – 14 April 1896
Prime Minister	Itō Hirobumi
Preceded by	Yasushi Nomura
Succeeded by	Itagaki Taisuke
Minister of Communications
In office 2 June 1901 – 17 July 1903
Prime Minister	Katsura Tarō
Preceded by	Hara Takashi
Succeeded by	Sone Arasuke
In office 8 November 1898 – 19 October 1900
Prime Minister	Yamagata Aritomo
Preceded by	Hayashi Yūzō
Succeeded by	Hoshi Tōru
Minister of Justice
In office 16 March 1893 – 26 September 1896
Prime Minister	Itō Hirobumi; Matsukata Masayoshi
Preceded by	Yamagata Aritomo; Itō Hirobumi (acting)
Succeeded by	Kiyoura Keigo
Acting Minister of Education
In office 29 August 1894 – 3 October 1894
Prime Minister	Itō Hirobumi
Preceded by	Inoue Kowashi
Succeeded by	Saionji Kinmochi
Minister of Education
In office 17 May 1890 – 1 June 1891
Prime Minister	Yamagata Aritomo; Matsukata Masayoshi
Preceded by	Enomoto Takeaki
Succeeded by	Ōki Takatō

Member of the Privy Council
- In office 13 March 1919 – 10 January 1920
- Monarch: Taishō
- In office 3 February 1910 – 9 January 1912
- Monarch: Meiji

Member of the House of Peers
- In office 28 November 1900 – 21 September 1907 Elected by the Viscounts

Governor of Tokyo
- In office 19 July 1882 – 13 June 1885
- Monarch: Meiji
- Preceded by: Matsuda Michiyuki
- Succeeded by: Hiromoto Watanabe

Personal details
- Born: 21 January 1842 Yamakawa, Awa, Japan
- Died: 10 January 1920 (aged 77) Moto-Azabu, Tokyo, Japan
- Resting place: Aoyama Cemetery

Count Yoshikawa Akimasa (芳川 顕正; 21 January 1842 – 10 January 1920) was a Japanese bureaucrat, statesman and cabinet minister, active in Meiji and Taishō period Japan.

== Early life ==
Yoshikawa was born in Yamakawa, Awa Province (currently Yoshinogawa, Tokushima) as the son of a local samurai. After the Meiji Restoration, he went to Tokyo and entered into service of the new Meiji government, rising to become head of the National Printing Bureau under the Ministry of Finance in 1872.

== Political career ==
=== Governor of Tokyo ===
Yoshikawa was a close protégé of Yamagata Aritomo and at Yamagata's urging, served as Governor of Tokyo from July 1882 to June 1885. As Governor, Yoshikawa submitted a plan for the complete redevelopment of Tokyo based on the redevelopment of Paris under Napoleon III. Yoshikawa's plan called for a system of wide boulevards and canals radiating out from the Tokyo Imperial Palace. He also called for an expansion of the train system to a terminus in an expanded Tokyo Station. Although some elements of the “Yoshikawa Plan” were eventually implemented, most remained on paper due to completing plans raised by other politicians, notably Inoue Kaoru.

=== Cabinet Minister ===
Yoshikawa then worked as Deputy Director of the Home Ministry from March 1886 to May 1890. When Yamagata became Prime Minister, Yoshikawa was appointed to his cabinet as Minister of Education, a post which he held from May 1890 to June 1891. Emperor Meiji expressed reservations over the appointment, but was convinced by Yamagata that the choice of the conservative Yoshikawa was suitable. During this period, he played an important role in writing the Imperial Rescript on Education, which articulated government policy on the guiding principles of education in the Empire of Japan, and which had to be memorized by all students.

In 1893, under the Second Itō Cabinet, Yoshikawa was appointed Minister of Justice. He continued in the same position through the Second Matsukata Cabinet. In February 1896, while still holding the position of Minister of Justice, he was concurrently appointed Home Minister. He also served as a chamberlain in the Imperial Household.

In 1898, under the First Ōkuma Cabinet, he was reappointed as Home Minister, and under the Second Yamagata Cabinet in November 1898, was made Minister of Communications. That same year, he was elevated to the kazoku peerage with the title of shishaku (viscount).

In 1901, under the First Katsura Cabinet, he was reappointed as Minister of Communications. After his term ended in July 1903, he announced that he would be leaving public service; however, he accepted the post of Home Minister again in February 1904, serving until September 1905.

=== Later career ===
In 1907, Yoshikawa became the 1st chairman of the Japan Society for Prevention of Sexually-transmitted Disease. He was subsequently elevated to hakushaku (count).

In 1912, he became deputy secretary of the Privy Council. However, in 1917, he was forced to resign his positions and retire from public life over a major scandal caused by his 4th daughter Kamako.

== Personal life ==
Yoshikawa had four daughters but no sons, he adopted a younger son of Sone Arasuke, who married his Yoshikawa's 4th daughter Kamako. The son, Hiroharu, became a prominent businessman. However, Kamako had an affair with her chauffeur, with whom she attempted a double suicide by throwing themselves in front of a train. The chauffeur died instantly, but Kamako survived with serious injuries. The revelation of her adultery across class lines brought vehement condemnation from the press and Yoshikawa's peers, and forced his retirement from public life.

Yoshikawa's birthplace in Yoshinogawa, Tokushima is preserved as a house museum. His grave is located at Aoyama Cemetery in Tokyo.

== Notes ==
Political offices
Preceded by Katsura Tarō	Home Minister; February 20, 1904 – September 16, 1905	Succeeded by Kiyoura Keigo
Preceded by Hara Kei	Communications Minister; June 2, 1901 – July 17, 1903	Succeeded by Hoshi Toru
Preceded by Nomura Yasushi	Home Minister; February 3, 1896 – April 14, 1896	Succeeded by Itagaki Taisuke
Preceded by Inoue Kaoru	Minister of Education (acting); August 29, 1894 – October 3, 1894	Succeeded by Saionji Kinmochi
Preceded by Itō Hirobumi	Minister of Justice; March 16, 1893 – September 26, 1896	Succeeded by Kiyoura Keigo
Preceded by Enomoto Takeaki	Minister of Education; May 17, 1890 – June 1, 1891	Succeeded by Ōki Takatō
Preceded by Hayashi Yūzō	Communications Minister; November 8, 1898 – October 19, 1900	Succeeded by Sone Arasuke
Preceded by Kabayama Sukenori	Home Minister; January 12, 1898 – June 30, 1898	Succeeded by Itagaki Taisuke
Preceded by Matsuda Michiyuki	Governor of Tokyo; July 19, 1882 – June 13, 1885	Succeeded by Watanabe Koki
