= Hatano Norinao =

Senior Second Rank Viscount Hatano Norinao
- 波多野 敬直
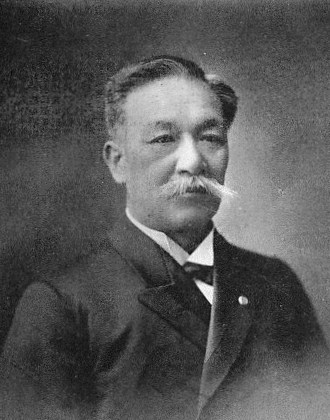

Minister of the Imperial Household
- In office 9 April 1914 – 18 June 1920
- Monarch: Taishō
- Preceded by: Watanabe Chiaki
- Succeeded by: Nakamura Yujirō

Minister of Justice
- In office 22 September 1903 – 7 January 1906
- Prime Minister: Katsura Tarō
- Preceded by: Kiyoura Keigo
- Succeeded by: Matsuda Masahisa

Member of the House of Peers
- In office 7 January 1906 – 7 June 1911 Nominated by the Emperor

Personal details
- Born: 13 November 1850 Ogi, Hizen, Japan
- Died: 29 August 1922 (aged 71) Tokyo, Japan
- Education: Daigakkō

Hatano Norinao (Japanese: 波多野敬直) (13 November 1850 – 29 August 1922) was a Japanese Minister of the Imperial Household during Taishō era. He was born in Saga Prefecture. He was recipient of the Order of the Sacred Treasure (3rd class, 1899; 1st class, 1906), the Order of the Rising Sun (1 December 1915) and the Victory Medal for World War I (10 November 1915).

== Bibliography ==
- 霞会館華族家系大成編輯委員会『平成新修旧華族家系大成』（霞会館、1996年）
- 衆議院・参議院編『議会制度七十年史』（大蔵省印刷局、1962年）
