= Ministry of Communications (Japan) =

Cabinet-level ministry in the Empire of Japan

- 逓信省; Teishin-shō

Agency overview
- Formed: December 22, 1885
- Dissolved: April 1, 1949
- Superseding agencies: Ministry of Posts; Ministry of Telecommunications
- Jurisdiction: Japan
- Headquarters: Chiyoda-ku, Tokyo, Japan
- Parent agency: Government of Japan

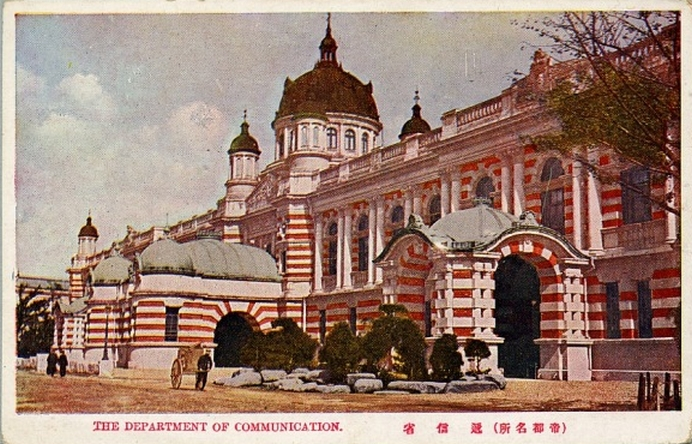
Communications Ministry (Teishin-shō) offices, Tokyo, pre-1923

The Ministry of Communications (逓信省, Teishin-shō) was a Cabinet-level ministry in the Empire of Japan, operating a postal, telegraph and telephone service. Its modern successors include the Ministry of Internal Affairs and Communications, Japan Post Holdings and NTT.

== History ==
=== Meiji period ===
On December 22, 1885 the Ministry of Communications was established, combining the Bureau of Posts and Post Station Maintenance and Shipping Bureau formerly under the Ministry of Agriculture and Commerce with the Telegraph Bureau and Lighthouse Management Bureau formerly under the Ministry of Industry. On August 16, 1891, the ministry was also placed in charge of the nascent Japanese electric power industry. On July 21, 1892, the Railway Bureau was transferred to the Ministry of Communications from the Home Ministry and from November 10, 1893, the ministry was charged with the supervision of all land and water transportation businesses.

However, on December 5, 1908, the Railway Bureau was separated to become an independent bureau reporting directly to the Cabinet.

=== Showa period ===
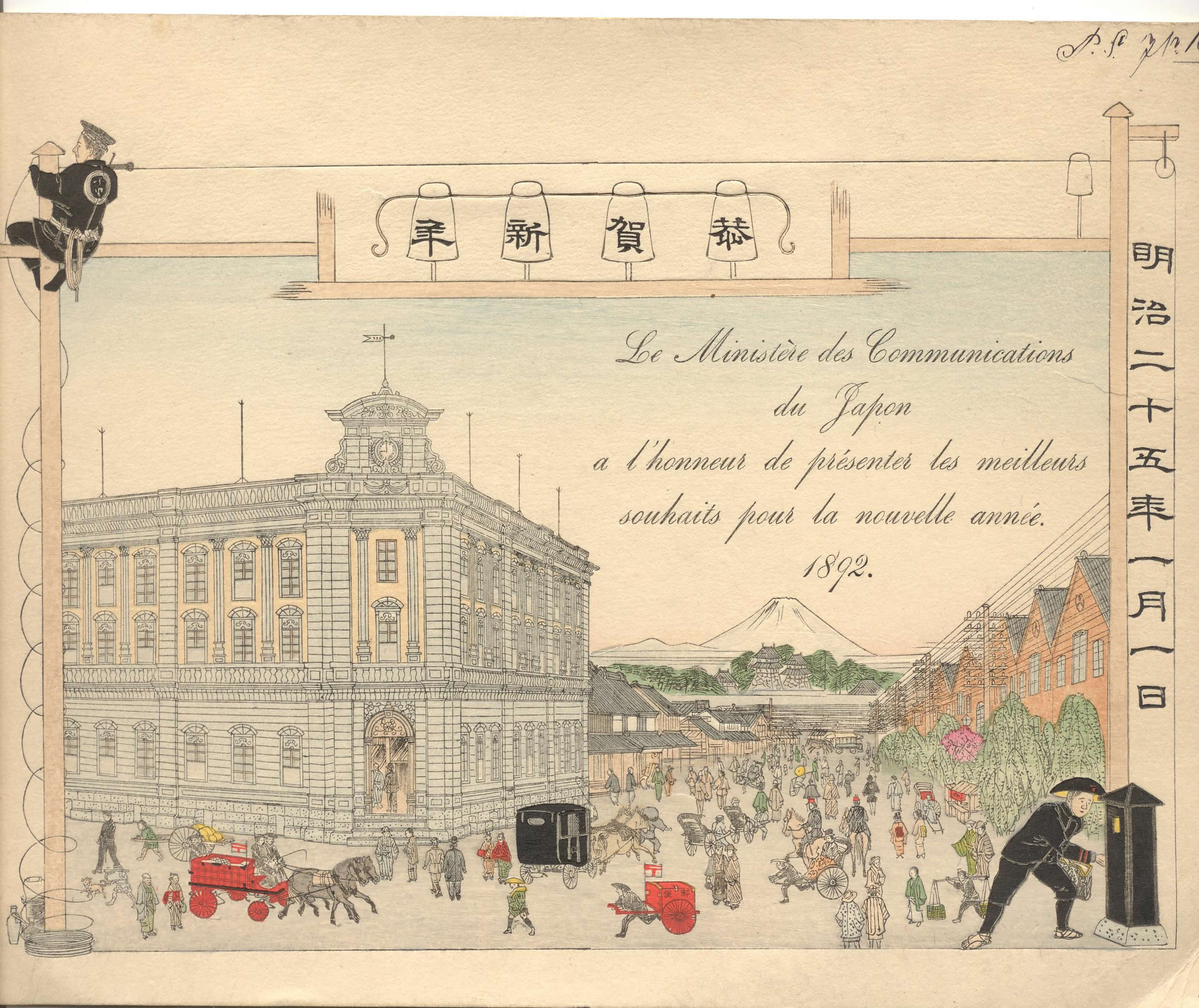
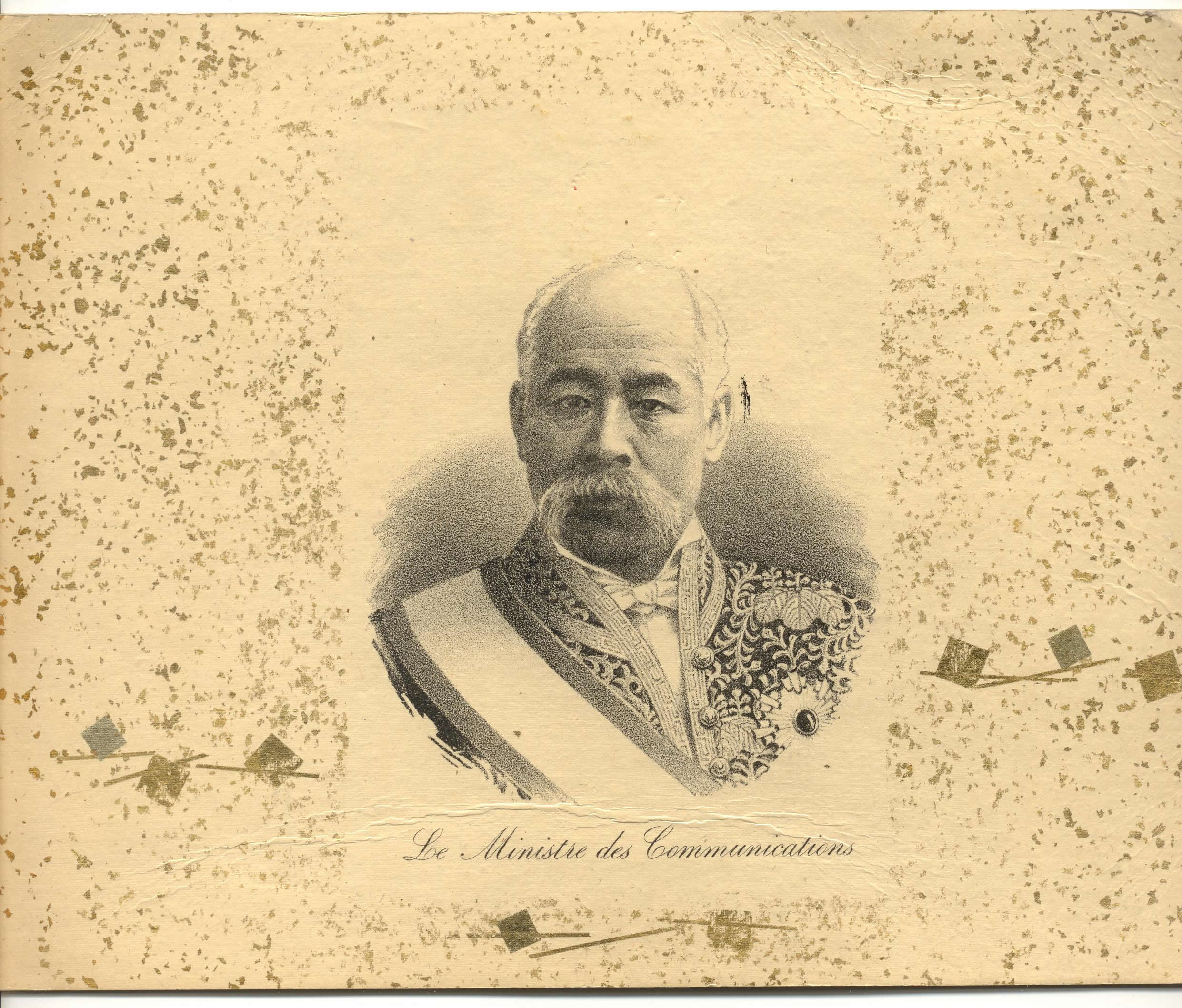
New Year card 1892

In April 1923, responsibility for civil aviation supervision was transferred to the Ministry of Communications from the Army Ministry. With the creation of the Railway Ministry in May 1928, supervision of all land transportation was removed from the Ministry of Communications. With the establishment in January 1938 of the Ministry of Health and Welfare, all matters pertaining to the postal insurance program were transferred to the new ministry, with the Ministry of Communications retaining control of the post offices and managing the postal system (including the Postal savings system. In December 1941, an external Maritime Affairs Council was established and took over the Lighthouse Bureau.

On November 1, 1943 the Ministry of Communications was merged with Railway Ministry to become the Ministry of Communications and Transport. Electrical production and aircraft manufacturing regulation was transferred to the Minister of Munitions. Posts, telephone and telegraph, post office bank and insurance came under the Communications Institute, where issues relating the transportation came under the Directorate General of Shipping.

In May 1945, the Communications Institute became the Board of Communications, reporting directly to the Cabinet, and the Ministry of Communications and Transport was renamed the Ministry of Transport.

=== Post-war dissolution ===
After the surrender of Japan, the American occupation authorities briefly reestablished the Ministry of Communications on April 1, 1946; however it was in charge of only posts, telecommunications and the security of aerial navigation. The Ministry was formally abolished on April 1, 1949 and its responsibilities divided between the new Ministry of Postal Services and Ministry of Telecommunications.

== Ministers of Communications ==
	Name	Cabinet	Date in office	comments
1	Enomoto Takeaki	1st Itō, Kuroda	22 December 1885	concurrently Agriculture & Commerce
2	Gotō Shōjirō	Kuroda, 1st Yamagata, 1st Matsukata	30 April 1888	
3	Kuroda Kiyotaka	2nd Itō	8 August 1892	
4	Watanabe Kunitake	2nd Itō	17 March 1895	concurrently Finance Minister
5	Shirane Senichi	2nd Itō, 2nd Matsukata	9 October 1895	
6	Nomura Yasushi	2nd Matsukata	26 September 1898	
7	Suematsu Kenchō	3rd Itō	12 January 1898	
8	Hayashi Yūzō	Ōkuma	30 June 1898	
9	Yoshikawa Akimasa	2nd Yamagata	8 November 1898	
10	Hoshi Tōru	4th Itō	19 October 1900	
11	Hara Takashi	4th Itō	22 December 1900	
12	Yoshikawa Akimasa	1st Katsura	2 June 1901	
13	Sone Arasuke	1st Katsura	17 July 1903	concurrently Finance Minister
14	Ōura Kanetake	1st Katsura	12 September 1903	
15	Yamagata Isaburō	1st Saionji	7 July 1906	
16	Hara Takashi	1st Saionji	14 January 1908	concurrently Home Minister
17	Hotta Masayasu	1st Saionji	25 March 1908	
18	Gotō Shinpei	2nd Katsura	14 July 1908	
19	Hayashi Tadasu	2nd Katsura	30 August 1911	concurrently Home Minister
20	Gotō Shinpei	3rd Katsura	21 December 1912	
21	Motoda Hajime	1st Yamamoto	20 February 1913	
22	Taketomi Tokitoshi	2nd Ōkuma	16 April 1914	
23	Minoura Katsundo	2nd Ōkuma	10 August 1915	
24	Den Kenjirō	Terauchi	9 October 1916	
25	Noda Utarō	Hara, Takahashi	29 September 1918	
26	Maeda Toshisada	Katō Tomosaburō	12 June 1922	
27	Inukai Tsuyoshi	2nd Yamamoto	2 September 1923	concurrently Education Minister
28	Yoshirō Fujimura	Kiyoura	7 January 1924	
29	Inukai Tsuyoshi	Katō Takaaki	11 June 1924	
30	Adachi Kenzō	Katō Takaaki, 1st Wakatsuki	30 May 1925	
31	Mochizuki Keisuke	Tanaka	20 April 1927	
32	Fusanosuke Kuhara	Tanaka	23 May 1928	
33	Matajirō Koizumi	Hamaguchi, 2nd Wakatsuki	2 July 1929	
34	Chūzō Mitsuji	Inukai	13 December 1931	
35	Hiroshi Minami	Saitō	26 May 1932	
36	Tokonami Takejirō	Okada	8 July 1934	
37	Keisuke Okada	Okada	9 September 1935	concurrently Prime Minister
38	Mochizuki Keisuke	Okada	12 September 1935	
39	Tanomogi Keikichi	Hirota	9 March 1936	
40	Tatsunosuke Yamazaki	Hayashi	2 February 1937	concurrently Agriculture & Forestry Minister
41	Hideo Kodama	Hayashi	10 February 1937	
42	Ryūtarō Nagai	1st Konoe	4 June 1937	
43	Suehiko Shiono	Hiranuma	5 January 1939	concurrently Justice Minister
44	Harumichi Tanabe	Hiranuma	7 April 1939	
45	Ryūtarō Nagai	Abe	30 August 1939	concurrently Railway Minister
46	Masanori Katsu	Yonai	16 January 1940	
47	Shōzō Murata	2nd Konoe, 3rd Konoe	22 July 1940	
48	Ken Terajima	Tōjō	18 October 1941	
49	Yoshiaki Hatta	Tōjō	8 October 1943	concurrently Railway Minister
