= Hiromoto Watanabe =

- 渡辺 洪基
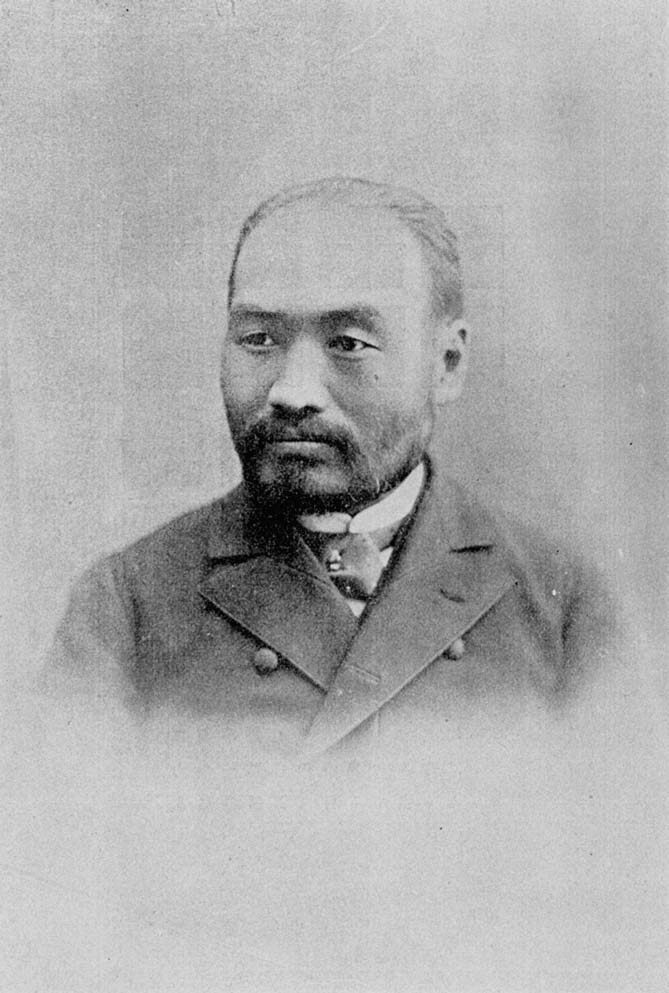

Member of the House of Peers
- In office 23 December 1897 – 24 May 1901 Nominated by the Emperor

Member of the House of Representatives
- In office 15 February 1892 – 30 December 1893
- Preceded by: Michiyuki Tanimoto
- Succeeded by: Tetsusaburō Hiyama
- Constituency: Tokyo 2nd

Member of the Tokyo City Council
- In office June 1889 – 4 July 1890
- Constituency: Shiba Ward

Governor of Tokyo
- In office 13 June 1885 – 9 March 1886
- Monarch: Meiji
- Preceded by: Yoshikawa Akimasa
- Succeeded by: Takasaki Goroku

Member of the Genrōin
- In office 24 May 1882 – 19 July 1884

Personal details
- Born: 28 January 1848 Nanjō, Echizen, Japan
- Died: 24 May 1901 (aged 53) Shibuya, Tokyo, Japan
- Party: Kokumin Kyōkai
- Education: Keio University

Watanabe Hiromoto (also read as Watanabe Kouki, 渡辺洪基; 28 January 1848 – 24 May 1901) was a Japanese statesman, politician, diplomat, educator. Member of the Imperial Parliament of Japan, member of the Senate. The head of Tokyo Prefecture (1885–1886), Rector of Tokyo Imperial University (1886–1890).

== Biography ==
Watanabe Hiromoto was born on 28 January 1848, in Fuchu, Echizen Province, the son of Watanabe Seyan, a Fukui-han doctor. In 1857 he entered the local Rikkyo School and then to the Fukui Sisei School.

In 1864, at the age of 18, Hiromoto arrived in Edo, where he studied medicine under Sato Shunkaya. He then entered the private Keio Fukuzawa Yukichi School, after which he founded the English School in Aizu-han.

During the Boshin War of 1868–1869, Hiromoto participated on the side of the anti-government Northern Alliance. After the imperial pardon, he joined the new government as a junior Ministry of Foreign Affairs clerk.

In 1871 Hiromoto was elected to the Iwakura Embassy, and spent two years abroad studying the social and political order of Europe and the United States. In 1874, after his return home, he was promoted to the rank of secretary of the first class and sent as temporary deputy ambassador of Japan to Austria-Hungary.

From 1882 to 1884 Hiromoto served as a member of the Japanese Senate, and also served as vice-president of the Senate. In 1885 he was appointed head of Tokyo prefecture.

In 1886, at the age of 39, Hiromoto became the fifth rector of Tokyo Imperial University. The following year he founded the Technical School, which developed into the University of Tokyo, and in 1895 he served on the board of the private Keio School, the future Keio University. In 1900 Hiromoto became chairman of the Okura School of Commerce, on the basis of which the Tokyo University of Economics emerged.

In 1890 Hiromoto was sent to Austria-Hungary a second time as ambassador extraordinary and plenipotentiary. After his return in 1892, he opened the Rem road linking the prefectures of Tochigi and Gumma and founded the conservative political organization National Association. On behalf of this organization, the former diplomat participated in the Japanese parliament.

On 24 May 1901, Hiromoto died in Tokyo at the age of 53.
