= Hayashi Yūzō =

Japanese politician

Junior Second Rank Hayashi Yūzō
- 林 有造
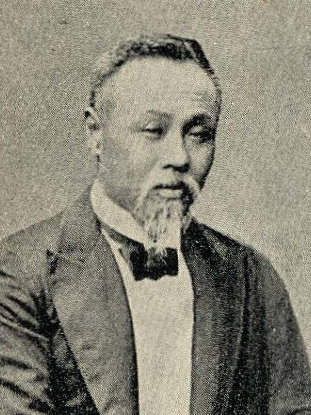

Minister of Agriculture and Commerce
- In office 19 October 1900 – 2 June 1901
- Prime Minister: Itō Hirobumi
- Preceded by: Sone Arasuke
- Succeeded by: Hirata Tosuke

Minister of Communications
- In office 30 June 1898 – 8 November 1898
- Prime Minister: Ōkuma Shigenobu
- Preceded by: Suematsu Kenchō
- Succeeded by: Yoshikawa Akimasa

Member of the House of Representatives
- In office 10 August 1902 – 27 March 1908
- Preceded by: Constituency established
- Succeeded by: Multi-member district
- Constituency: Kōchi Counties (1902–1904); Chiba Prefecture (1904–1908)
- In office 5 August 1893 – 10 June 1898
- Preceded by: Kataoka Naoharu
- Succeeded by: Yamada Heizaemon
- Constituency: Kōchi 2nd
- In office 2 July 1890 – 25 December 1891
- Preceded by: Constituency established
- Succeeded by: Kataoka Naoharu
- Constituency: Kōchi 2nd

Personal details
- Born: 21 September 1842 Sukumo, Tosa, Japan
- Died: 29 December 1921 (aged 79) Hata, Kōchi, Japan
- Party: Rikken Seiyūkai
- Other political affiliations: Jiyūtō (1890–1898); Kenseitō (1898–1900)
- Children: Jōji Hayashi
- Relatives: Iwamura Michitoshi (brother); Takatoshi Iwamura (brother); Michiyo Iwamura (nephew); Yū Hayashi (grandson)

Hayashi Yūzō (林 有造; 21 September 1842 – 29 December 1921) was a politician and cabinet minister in the pre-war Empire of Japan.

== Biography ==
Hayashi Yūzō was a native of Tosa Province (modern-day Kōchi Prefecture), where his father, Iwamura Hidetoshi, was a samurai in the service of Tosa Domain. His elder brother was Iwamura Michitoshi and his younger brother was Takatoshi Iwamura, both of whom served in numerous posts within the Meiji government. He was adopted into the Hayashi family at an early age. During the Boshin War, he fought against the forces of the Tokugawa shogunate in Echigo Province.

Following the Meiji Restoration, Hayashi joined the new Meiji government. He was sent on a mission to Europe in August 1870 to monitor the Franco-Prussian War, and arrived in Berlin in October together with Ōyama Iwao, Shinagawa Yajirō, and Arichi Shinanojō. After his return to Japan in May 1871, he worked with Itagaki Taisuke but resigned in 1873 due to his disagreement with government policy in the Seikanron debate. He returned to Kōchi but was later arrested for supplying arms in support of Saigō Takamori in the Satsuma Rebellion. One of the leading advocates of the rebellion, Hayashi also planned to seize a Mitsubishi steamer and attack the government arsenal at Osaka. For these actions, he was sentenced to ten years in prison.

Following his release from prison in 1886, Hayashi rejoined Itagaki Taisuke and became a member of the Jiyūtō political party. He was temporarily expelled from Tokyo under the Safety Preservation Law of 1887 for his continued opposition to government policies. He won a seat in the Lower House of the Diet of Japan in the 1890 General Election, and was subsequently reelected eight times to the same seat.

In the First Ōkuma Cabinet in 1898, Hayashi was appointed Minister of Communications. He rejoined the cabinet again in 1900 under the Fourth Itō Cabinet as Minister of Agriculture and Commerce and assisted in the formation of the Rikken Seiyūkai political party. Hayashi retired from public life in 1908.

Returning to his native Kōchi Prefecture, Hayashi became an entrepreneur, forming a company to make cultured pearls. He died in 1921 at age 80 and his grave is located in the city of Sukumo, Kōchi.

== Notes ==
Political offices
Preceded by Suematsu Kenchō	Minister of Communications; Jun 1898 – Nov 1898	Succeeded by Yoshikawa Akimasa
Preceded by Sone Arasuke	Minister of Agriculture & Commerce; Oct 1900 – Jun 1902	Succeeded by Hirata Tosuke
