= Sone Arasuke =

Japanese politician

Senior Second Rank Viscount Sone Arasuke
- 曾禰 荒助
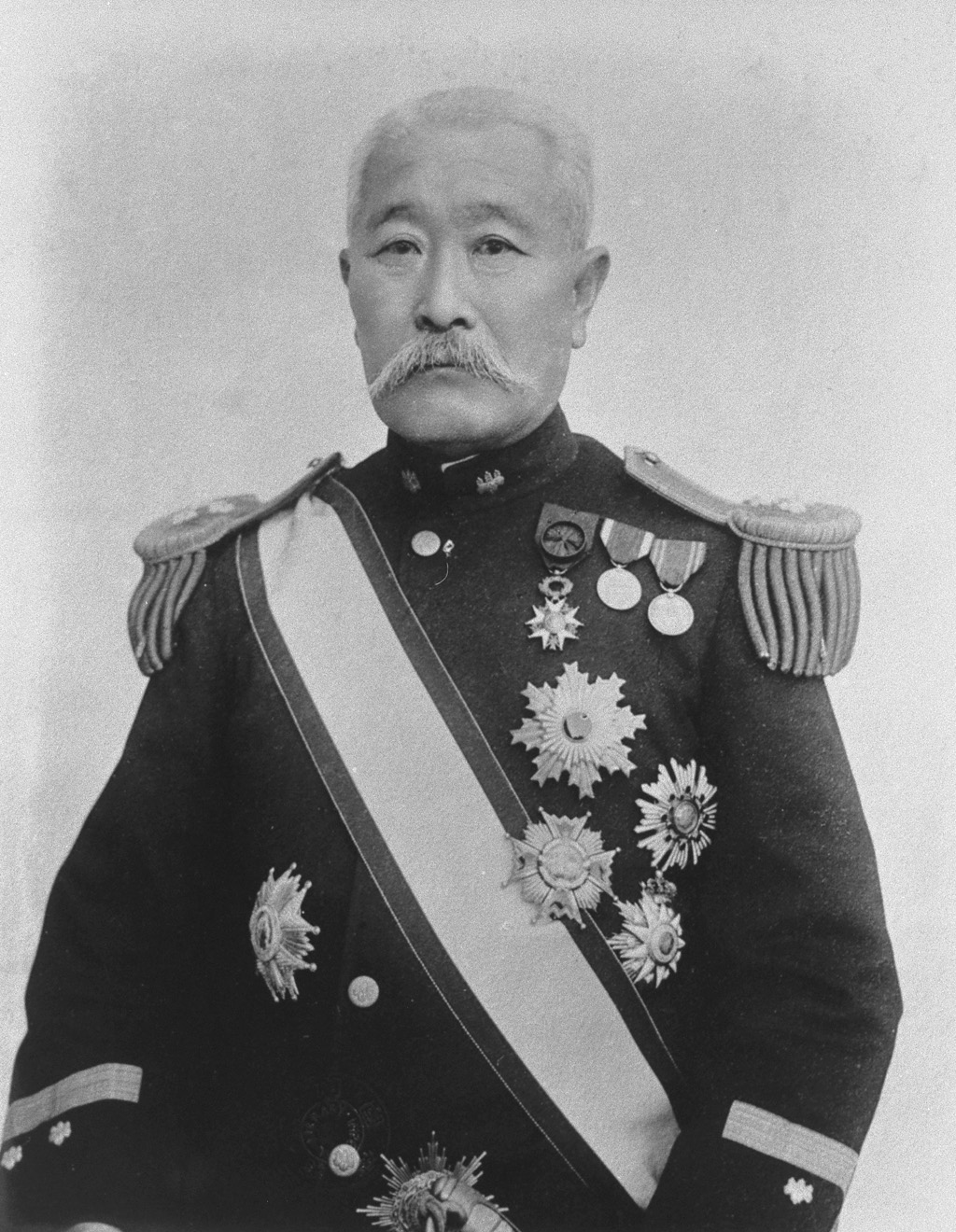

Resident-General of Korea
- In office 14 June 1909 – 30 May 1910
- Monarch: Meiji
- Preceded by: Itō Hirobumi
- Succeeded by: Terauchi Masatake
Ministerial offices
Minister of Finance
In office 2 June 1901 – 7 January 1906
Prime Minister	Katsura Tarō
Preceded by	Watanabe Kunitake; Saionji Kinmochi (acting)
Succeeded by	Sakatani Yoshirō
Minister of Communications
In office 17 July 1903 – 22 September 1903
Prime Minister	Katsura Tarō
Preceded by	Yoshikawa Akimasa
Succeeded by	Ōura Kanetake
Minister for Foreign Affairs
In office 3 June 1901 – 21 September 1901
Prime Minister	Katsura Tarō
Preceded by	Katō Takaaki
Succeeded by	Komura Jutarō
Minister of Agriculture and Commerce
In office 8 November 1898 – 19 October 1900
Prime Minister	Yamagata Aritomo
Preceded by	Ōishi Masami
Succeeded by	Hayashi Yūzō
Minister of Justice
In office 12 January 1898 – 30 June 1898
Prime Minister	Itō Hirobumi
Preceded by	Kiyoura Keigo
Succeeded by	Gitetsu Ohigashi

Vice Speaker of the House of Representatives
- In office 3 May 1892 – 31 August 1893
- Speaker: Hoshi Tōru
- Preceded by: Tsuda Mamichi
- Succeeded by: Kusumoto Masataka

Member of the Privy Council
- In office 13 April 1906 – 13 September 1910
- Monarch: Meiji

Member of the House of Peers
- In office 26 September 1900 – 17 May 1906 Nominated by the Emperor

Member of the House of Representatives
- In office 6 May 1892 – 30 December 1893
- Preceded by: Horie Yoshisuke
- Succeeded by: Ogura Jinkichi
- Constituency: Yamaguchi 4th

Personal details
- Born: 20 February 1849 Hagi, Chōshū, Japan
- Died: 13 September 1910 (aged 61) Katase, Kanagawa, Japan
- Party: Independent
- Occupation: Politician, Diplomat, Cabinet Minister

Viscount Sone Arasuke (曾禰 荒助; February 20, 1849 – September 13, 1910) was a Japanese politician, diplomat, cabinet minister, and second Japanese Resident-General of Korea.

== Biography ==
Sone was born in Nagato Province in Chōshū Domain (present-day Yamaguchi prefecture, his adopted father was a samurai from Hagi. He fought on the imperial side in the Boshin War.

After the Meiji Restoration, Sone was sent to France for studies, and on his return to Japan served in the War Ministry. Later, he served as director of the Cabinet Gazette Bureau, Secretary of the Cabinet Legislation Bureau and other posts, in 1890 he became the first Chief Secretary of the House of Representatives of the first session of the Diet of Japan.

Sone was elected to the House of Representatives in the 1892 Japanese general election, and served as Vice-Speaker of the House in the same year. In 1893, he became Japanese ambassador to France and negotiated the revision of the unequal treaties between France and Japan.

He served successively in a number of cabinet posts: Minister of Justice in the third Itō administration, Agriculture and Commerce Minister in the second Yamagata administration, Finance Minister in the first Katsura administration and other posts.

During the Russo-Japanese War with the help of Takahashi Korekiyo and others, he secured the foreign loans necessary to finance the expenses of the war. In 1900, Emperor Meiji nominated him to the House of Peers. In 1902, he was made a baron (danshaku) under the kazoku peerage system. He became a Privy Councillor in 1906, and elevated in status to viscount (shishaku) the following year.

Sone was appointed as Vice Resident-General of the Japanese administration in Korea in 1907, and Resident-General of Korea in 1909, replacing Itō Hirobumi. One of his major actions in Korea was to install a peninsula-wide telephone network, linking government offices, police stations and military installations throughout Korea. Sone was opposed to the Japanese annexation of Korea, but was forced to resign from his post in May 1910 due to illness and died a few months later.

== Notes ==
Political offices
Preceded by Kiyoura Keigo	Minister of Justice; January 1898 – June 1900	Succeeded by Ōhigashi Gitetsu
Preceded by Ōishi Masami	Minister of Agriculture & Commerce; November 1898 – October 1900	Succeeded by Hayashi Yūzō
Preceded by Saionji Kinmochi	Minister of Finance; June 1901 – January 1906	Succeeded by Sakatani Yoshiō
Preceded by Katō Takaaki	Minister of Foreign Affairs (Interim); June – September 1901	Succeeded by Komura Jutarō
Preceded by Yoshikawa Akimasa	Minister of Communications (Interim); July – September 1903	Succeeded by Ōura Kanetake
Government offices
Preceded by Itō Hirobumi	Japanese Resident-General of Korea; June 1909 – May 1910	Succeeded by Terauchi Masatake
