= Suematsu Kenchō =

Japanese politician (1855–1920)

Senior Second Rank Viscount Suematsu Kenchō
- 末松 謙澄
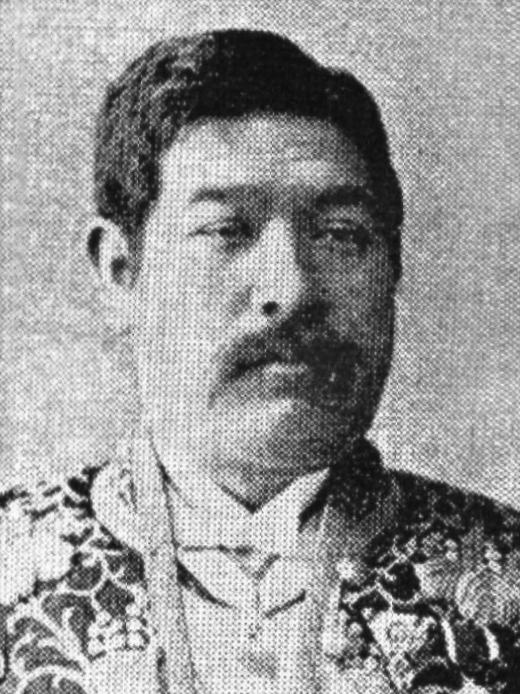
- Suematsu Kenchō c. 1898

Minister of Home Affairs
- In office 19 October 1900 – 2 June 1901
- Prime Minister: Itō Hirobumi
- Preceded by: Saigō Tsugumichi
- Succeeded by: Utsumi Tadakatsu

Minister of Communications
- In office 12 January 1898 – 30 June 1898
- Prime Minister: Itō Hirobumi
- Preceded by: Yasushi Nomura
- Succeeded by: Hayashi Yūzō

Director-General of the Legislative Bureau
- In office 29 September 1892 – 30 September 1896
- Prime Minister: Itō Hirobumi; Matsukata Masayoshi
- Preceded by: Saburō Ozaki
- Succeeded by: Tomotsune Kōmuchi

Member of the Privy Council
- In office 3 March 1906 – 5 October 1920
- Monarchs: Meiji; Taishō

Member of the House of Peers
- In office 25 June 1896 – 19 March 1906 Elected by the Barons

Member of the House of Representatives
- In office 2 July 1890 – 2 June 1894
- Preceded by: Constituency established
- Succeeded by: Tsutsumi Hirohisa
- Constituency: Fukuoka 8th

Personal details
- Born: Suematsu Ken'ichirō; 30 September 1855 Maeda, Buzen, Japan
- Died: 5 October 1920 (aged 65) Minato, Tokyo, Japan
- Party: Independent
- Other political affiliations: Taiseikai (1890–1891)
- Spouse: Ikuko Itō (m. 1889)
- Relatives: Itō Hirobumi (father-in-law)
- Education: Tokyo Higher Normal School; University College London; University of Cambridge

Viscount Suematsu Kenchō (末松 謙澄; 30 September 1855 – 5 October 1920) was a Japanese politician, intellectual and author who lived in the Meiji and Taishō periods. Apart from his activity in the Japanese government, he also wrote several important works on Japan in English. He was portrayed in a negative manner in Ryōtarō Shiba's novel Saka no Ue no Kumo.

== Early life ==
Suematsu was born in the hamlet of Maeda in Buzen Province, now part of Yukuhashi, Fukuoka Prefecture. He was the fourth son of the village headman (shōya), Suematsu Shichiemon. His name was initially Ken'ichirō (謙一郎), he later changed it to the shorter Kenchō.

At the age of ten he enrolled in a private school where he pursued studies in Chinese (kangaku 漢学). Suematsu went to Tokyo in 1871, and studied with Ōtsuki Bankei and Kondō Makoto. In 1872, he briefly entered the Tokyo Normal School, but left it soon after. It was around this time that he made the acquaintance of Takahashi Korekiyo.

In 1874, at age 20, Suematsu began working for the Tokyo Nichi Nichi Shimbun newspaper (predecessor to the Mainichi Shinbun), writing editorials under the pen name Sasanami Hitsuichi (笹波篳一). During his time working for the newspaper, he was befriended by its editor, Fukuchi Gen'ichirō.

== Suematsu at Cambridge ==
Suematsu arrived in London in 1878 with the Japanese embassy which was dispatched there, and enrolled in Cambridge University in 1881. He graduated with a law degree from Cambridge (St. John's College, Cambridge) in 1884, returning to Japan in 1886.

== Political activities ==
Suematsu was elected to the Diet of Japan in 1890. Suematsu served as Communications Minister (1898) and Home Minister in his father-in-law Itō Hirobumi's fourth cabinet, 1900–01. He had married Itō's second daughter Ikuko in 1889 when he was 35 and she was 22. As they were from clans which had fought in the 1860s (Kokura and Chōshū), he joked about his marriage as "taking a hostage".

Suematsu was influential in the founding of Moji port in 1889, approaching Shibusawa Eiichi for finance. He also worked to improve the moral standards of Japanese theatre and founded a society for drama criticism.

Suematsu was raised to the kazoku peerage in 1895, when he was made a baron (danshaku).

From 1904 to 1905 Suematsu was sent by the Japanese cabinet to Europe to counteract anti-Japanese propaganda of the Yellow Peril variety (e.g. Russian or German circles) and argue Japan's case in the Russo-Japanese War, much as Harvard-educated Kaneko Kentarō was doing at the request of Itō Hirobumi at the same time in the United States. He was promoted to viscount (shishaku) in 1907.

== Literary activities ==
Suematsu was also active as a writer of English works on Japanese subjects. His works include the first English translation of The Tale of Genji (which he wrote while at Cambridge) and several books on aspects of Japanese culture.

- Kenchio Suyematz, trans. Genji Monogatari : The Most Celebrated of the Classical Japanese Romances. London: Trubner, 1882.
- Baron Suematsu, A Fantasy of Far Japan; or, Summer Dream Dialogues. London: Constable, 1905.
- Kenchio Suyematsu, The Risen Sun. London: Constable, 1905.

== See also ==
- Kikuchi Dairoku
- Inagaki Manjirō
- Anglo-Japanese relations
- Japanese students in Britain

== References (books and articles) ==
- Suematsu Kencho: International Envoy to Wartime Europe, Ian Nish in 'On the Periphery of the Russo-Japanese War Part II', STICERD Discussion paper, LSE, No. IS/05/491, May 2005
- Japanese Students at Cambridge University in the Meiji Era, 1868-1912: Pioneers for the Modernization of Japan, by Noboru Koyama, translated by Ian Ruxton, (Lulu, September 2004, ISBN 1-4116-1256-6)
- "Suematsu Kencho, 1855-1920: Statesman, Bureaucrat, Diplomat, Journalist, Poet and Scholar," by Ian Ruxton, Chapter 6, Britain & Japan: Biographical Portraits, Volume 5, edited by Hugh Cortazzi, Global Oriental, 2005, ISBN 1-901903-48-6
- O'Brien, Phillips P. (2004). The Anglo-Japanese Alliance, 1902-1922. (London: RoutledgeCurzon).
- Lister, Ayako Hotta (1995). The Japan-British Exhibition of 1910: Gateway to the Island Empire of the East. (London: Routledge).
- Cobbing, Andrew (1998). The Japanese Discovery of Victorian Britain. (London: Routledge).
- M. Matsumura, Pōtsumasu he no michi: Kōkaron to Yōroppa no Suematsu Kenchō, pub. Hara Shobo, 1987, translated by Ian Ruxton with the English title Baron Suematsu in Europe during the Russo-Japanese War (1904-05): His Battle with Yellow Peril (lulu.com, 2011) ISBN 978-1-105-11202-7 preview
- M. Mehl (1993). "Suematsu Kenchô in Britain, 1878-1886", Japan Forum, 5.2, 1993:173-193.
- Henitiuk, Valerie L. (2010). A Creditable Performance under the Circumstances? Suematsu Kenchô and the Pre-Waley Tale of Genji. In TTR : traduction, terminologie, redaction, Vol. XXIII, no. 1, p. 41-70.
- Kowner, Rotem (2006). Historical Dictionary of the Russo-Japanese War. The Scarecrow Press. ISBN 0-8108-4927-5.

Political offices
| Preceded by Osaki Mitsuyoshi | Director-General of the Cabinet Legislation Bureau; 29 September 1892 – 30 September 1896 | Succeeded by Kamimura Tomotsune |
| Preceded by Nomura Yasushi | Minister of Communication; 12 January – 30 June 1898 | Succeeded by Hayashi Yūzō |
| Preceded by Saigō Tsugumichi | Home Minister; 19 October 1900 – 2 June 1901 | Succeeded by Utsumi Tadakatsu |
