= Kiyoura Keigo =

Prime Minister of Japan in 1924

Junior First Rank Count Kiyoura Keigo
- 清浦 奎吾
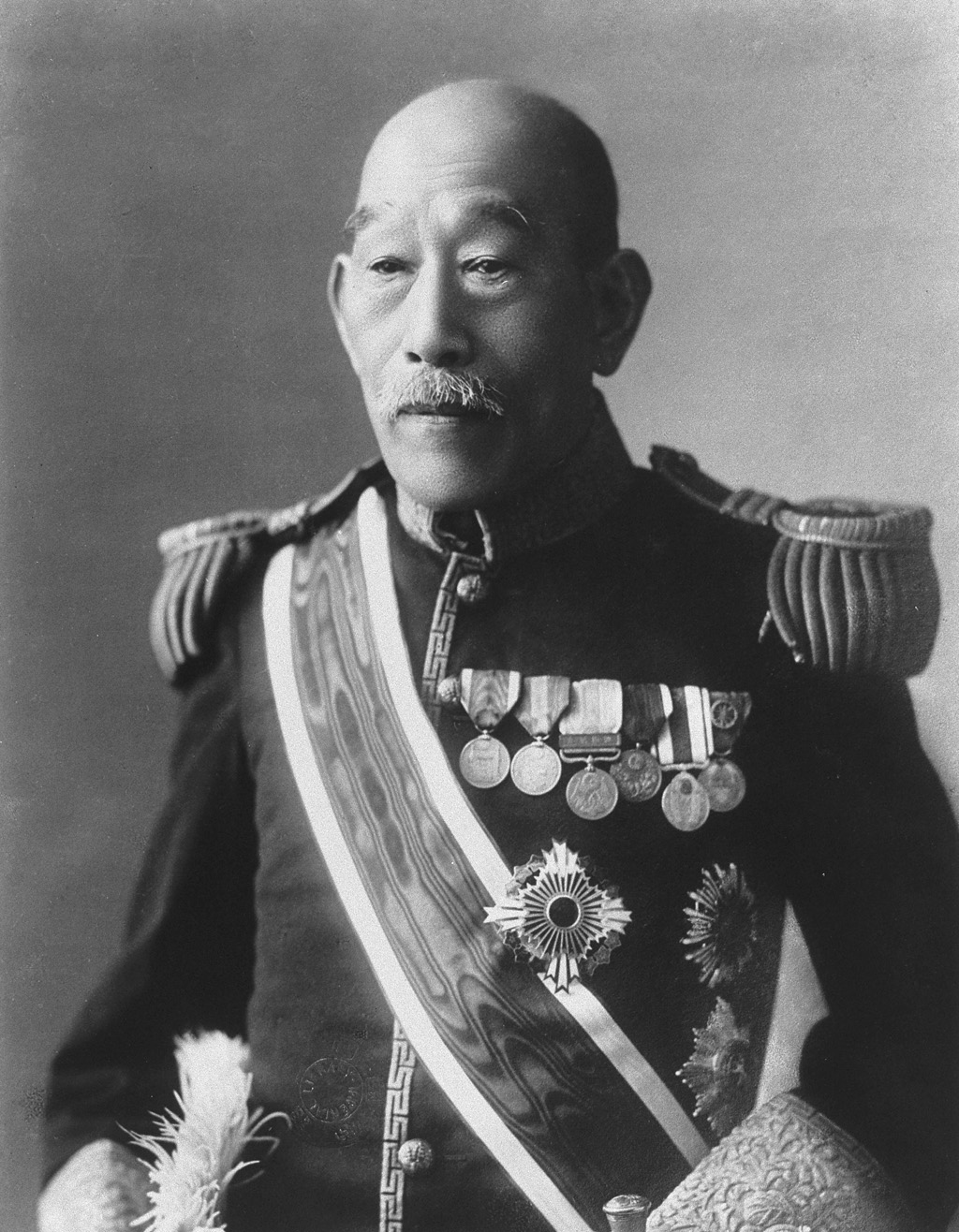

Prime Minister of Japan
- In office 7 January 1924 – 11 June 1924
- Monarch: Taishō
- Regent: Hirohito
- Preceded by: Yamamoto Gonnohyōe
- Succeeded by: Katō Takaaki
Privy Council offices
President of the Privy Council
In office 8 February 1922 – 7 January 1924
Monarch	Taishō
Vice President	Hamao Arata
Preceded by	Yamagata Aritomo
Succeeded by	Hamao Arata
Vice President of the Privy Council
In office 20 March 1917 – 8 February 1922
Monarch	Taishō
President	Yamagata Aritomo
Preceded by	Yoshikawa Akimasa
Succeeded by	Hamao Arata
Member of the Privy Council
In office 13 April 1906 – 20 March 1917
Monarchs	Meiji; Taishō
Ministerial offices
Minister of Home Affairs
In office 16 September 1905 – 7 January 1906
Prime Minister	Katsura Tarō
Preceded by	Yoshikawa Akimasa
Succeeded by	Hara Takashi
Minister of Agriculture and Commerce
In office 17 July 1903 – 7 January 1906
Prime Minister	Katsura Tarō
Preceded by	Hirata Tosuke
Succeeded by	Matsuoka Yasutake
Minister of Justice
In office 2 June 1901 – 22 September 1903
Prime Minister	Katsura Tarō
Preceded by	Kaneko Kentarō
Succeeded by	Hatano Norinao
In office 8 November 1898 – 19 October 1900
Prime Minister	Yamagata Aritomo
Preceded by	Gitetsu Ohigashi
Succeeded by	Kaneko Kentarō
In office 26 September 1896 – 12 January 1898
Prime Minister	Matsukata Masayoshi
Preceded by	Yoshikawa Akimasa
Succeeded by	Sone Arasuke

Member of the House of Peers
- In office 19 April 1891 – 17 May 1906 Nominated by the Emperor

Personal details
- Born: 14 February 1850 or 27 March 1850 Kamoto-gun, Higo, Japan
- Died: 5 November 1942 (aged 92) Atami, Shizuoka, Japan
- Party: Independent
- Spouse: Kiyoura Tōko (m. 1873)
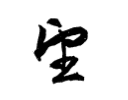
- Signature

Count Kiyoura Keigo (清浦 奎吾; 14 February or 27 March 1850 – 5 November 1942) was a Japanese politician. He was the Prime Minister of Japan in 1924, during the period which historians have called the "Taishō Democracy".

== Early life and education ==
Kiyoura was born Ōkubo Fujaku in Kamoto, Higo Province (part of present-day Yamaga, Kumamoto), as the fifth son of Ōkubo Ryōshi, the abbot of Menshōji Temple. He studied at the private school of Hirose Tanso from 1865 to 1871. During this time, he befriended Governor Nomura Morihide and took up the name "Kiyoura Keigo".

== Political career ==
Nomura was appointed governor of Saitama Prefecture in 1873 and appointed Kiyoura to a junior-grade civil service position there.

In 1876, at the age of twenty-six, Kiyoura joined the Ministry of Justice, and served as a prosecutor and helping draft Japan's first modern Criminal procedures laws. In 1884 he caught the attention of Yamagata Aritomo who appointed him head of the police forces in Japan, despite his relative youth of 34. Kiyoura went on to serve as Vice Minister of Justice, and Minister of Justice and while at the Ministry of Justice, he helped draft the Peace Preservation Law of 1887.

In 1891, he was selected as a member of the House of Peers by Imperial nomination. A close ally of Yamagata Aritomo, he was rewarded with numerous cabinet positions, including that of Justice Minister in the second Matsukata and second Yamagata administrations, and Justice, Agriculture and Commerce ministers in the first Katsura administration.

In 1902, Kiyoura was elevated to the title of baron (danshaku) in the kazoku peerage system. He received the 1st class of the Order of the Sacred Treasures the following year, and in 1906 was awarded with the 1st class of the Order of the Rising Sun. In September 1907, his title was elevated to viscount (shishaku).

In 1914, when Kiyoura was a Privy Councillor, he received an imperial order appointing him Prime Minister of Japan following Yamamoto Gonnohyōe. However, Kiyoura declined the post because of the controversy involving the ongoing Siemens scandal and Ōkuma Shigenobu was chosen to become prime minister instead.

== Premiership (1924) ==
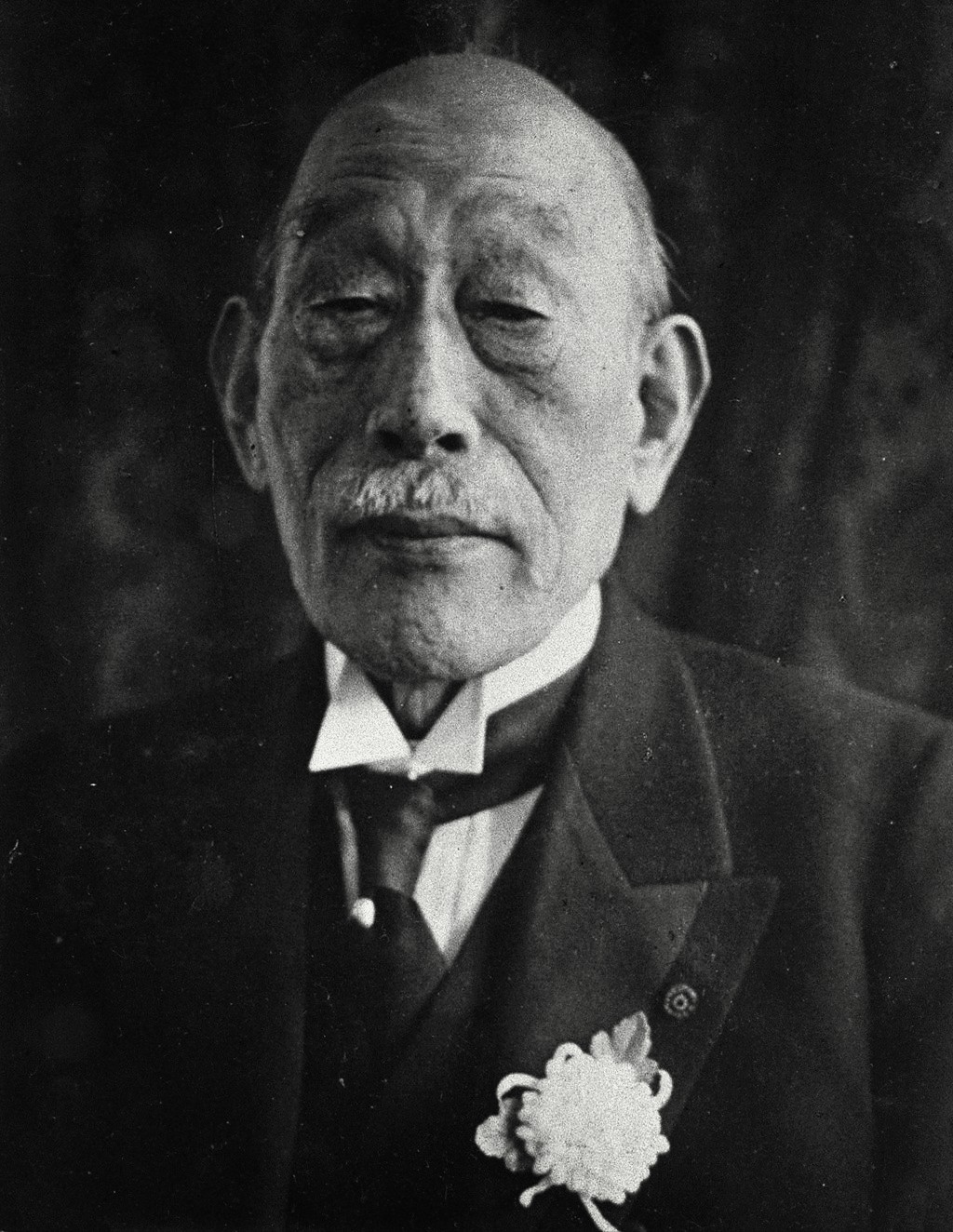
- Kiyoura in 1924
- Premiership of Kiyoura Keigo; 7 January 1924 – 11 June 1924
- Monarch: Emperor Taishō
- Cabinet: Kiyoura Cabinet
- Party: Independent
- Seat: Naikaku Sōri Daijin Kantei
- Emblem of the Government of Japan

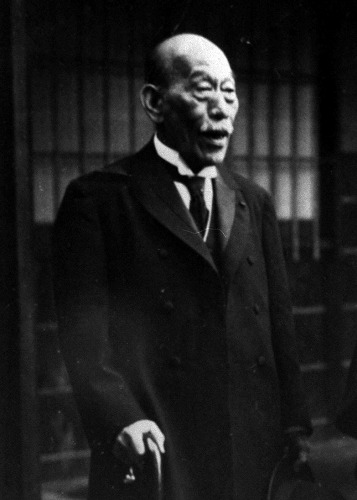
Kiyoura Keigo during his premiership

Kiyoura accepted a second imperial order in 1924 following the Toranomon Incident, and became Prime Minister of Japan. However, his cabinet was formed at a time when non-partisan, aristocratic cabinets were falling out of favor, and the Diet's lower house held up most of his initiatives for all six months of his administration.

Perhaps the most important event during his term as prime minister was the royal wedding of Crown Prince Hirohito (the future Emperor Shōwa) with Nagako Kuniyoshi (the future Empress Kōjun) on 26 January 1924.

In 1924, he dissolved the Lower House of the Diet of Japan when faced with the three party coalition of the Kenseikai, Rikken Seiyūkai and Kakushin Club which had formed a majority in Diet of more than 150 seats. As a result of his massive rout in the subsequent general election, his cabinet resigned en masse.

== Later life ==
In November 1928, Kiyoura was elevated to the title of Count (hakushaku). He was posthumously awarded the Grand Cordon of the Supreme Order of the Chrysanthemum in 1942.

== Honours ==
From the corresponding article in the Japanese Wikipedia

=== Peerages ===
- Baron (27 February 1902)
- Viscount (21 September 1907)
- Count (10 November 1928)

=== Decorations ===
- Grand Cordon of the Order of the Sacred Treasure (26 December 1903; Second Class: 26 June 1897; Third Class: 29 December 1895; Fourth Class: 28 December 1893; Fifth Class: 26 December 1890)
- Grand Cordon of the Order of the Rising Sun (1 April 1906; Sixth Class: 25 November 1887)
- Grand Cordon of the Order of the Rising Sun with Paulownia Flowers (4 September 1920)
- Grand Cordon of the Order of the Chrysanthemum (5 November 1942; posthumous)

== See also ==
- History of Japan

== Notes ==
Political offices
Preceded by Yamamoto Gonnohyōe	Prime Minister of Japan; Jan 1924 – Jun 1924	Succeeded by Katō Takaaki
Preceded by Yamagata Aritomo	Chairman, Privy Council; Feb 1922 – Jan 1924	Succeeded by Hamao Arata
Preceded by Yoshikawa Akimasa	Home Minister; Sept 1905 – Jan 1906	Succeeded by Hara Takashi
Preceded by Hirata Tosuke	Minister of Agriculture and Commerce; Jul 1903 – Jan 1906	Succeeded by Matsuoka Yasukowa
Preceded by Kaneko Kentarō	Minister of Justice; Jun 1901 – Sep 1903	Succeeded by Hatano Yoshinao
Preceded by Ōhigashi Yoshiakira	Minister of Justice; Nov 1898 – Oct 1900	Succeeded by Kaneko Kentarō
Preceded by Yoshikawa Akimasa	Minister of Justice; Sep 1896 – Jan 1898	Succeeded by Sone Arasuke
