= Katō Takaaki =

Prime Minister of Japan from 1924 to 1926

Senior Second Rank Count Katō Takaaki
- 加藤 高明
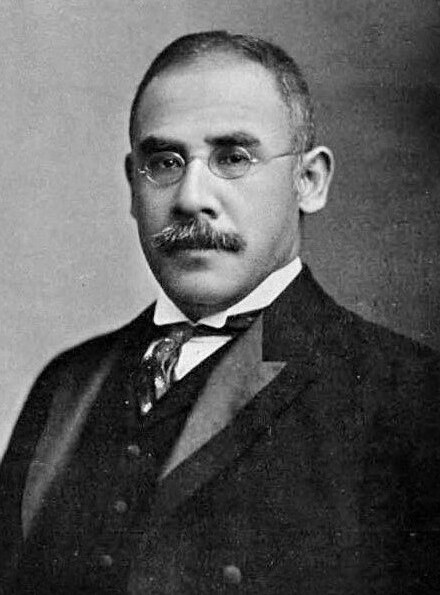

Prime Minister of Japan
- In office 11 June 1924 – 28 January 1926
- Monarch: Taishō
- Regent: Hirohito
- Preceded by: Kiyoura Keigo
- Succeeded by: Wakatsuki Reijirō

President of the Kenseikai
- In office 10 October 1916 – 28 January 1926
- Preceded by: Position established
- Succeeded by: Wakatsuki Reijirō

Minister for Foreign Affairs
- In office 16 April 1914 – 10 August 1915
- Prime Minister: Ōkuma Shigenobu
- Preceded by: Makino Nobuaki
- Succeeded by: Ōkuma Shigenobu
- In office 29 January 1913 – 20 February 1913
- Prime Minister: Katsura Tarō
- Preceded by: Katsura Tarō
- Succeeded by: Makino Nobuaki
- In office 7 January 1906 – 3 March 1906
- Prime Minister: Saionji Kinmochi
- Preceded by: Komura Jutarō
- Succeeded by: Saionji Kinmochi
- In office 19 October 1900 – 3 June 1901
- Prime Minister: Itō Hirobumi
- Preceded by: Aoki Shūzō
- Succeeded by: Sone Arasuke

Member of the House of Representatives
- In office 10 August 1902 – 11 December 1903
- Preceded by: Constituency established
- Succeeded by: Horiya Kijirō
- Constituency: Kōichi Counties (1902–1903); Yokohama City (1903)

Member of the House of Peers
- In office 10 August 1915 – 28 January 1926 Nominated by the Emperor

Personal details
- Born: Hattori Sokichi; 3 January 1860 Saya, Aichi, Japan
- Died: 28 January 1926 (aged 66) Tokyo, Japan
- Cause of death: Pneumonia
- Party: Kenseikai (1916–1926)
- Other political affiliations: Rikken Dōshikai (1913–1916)
- Spouse: Katō Haruji (m. 1886)
- Relatives: Kiuchi Jūshirō (brother-in-law); Kijūrō Shidehara (brother-in-law)
- Education: Tokyo Imperial University
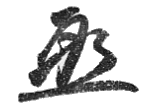
- Signature

Japanese name
- Kanji: 加藤 高明
Transcriptions
- Romanization: Katō Takaaki

Alternative Japanese name
- Kanji: 服部 総吉
Transcriptions
- Romanization: Hattori Sōkichi

Count Katō Takaaki (Japanese: 加藤 高明, Kyujitai: 加藤󠄁 高明󠄁; born Hattori Sōkichi [服部 総吉]; 3 January 1860 – 28 January 1926), also known as Katō Kōmei, was a Japanese politician, diplomat, and Prime Minister of Japan from 1924 until his death on 28 January 1926, during the period which historians have called "Taishō Democracy".

As Minister for Foreign Affairs, he negotiated the Anglo-Japanese Alliance, and presented China with the Twenty-One Demands, which demanded greater Japanese control of China. He was a key figure in the campaign for universal male suffrage in Japan. He has been characterized as a liberal.

== Early life ==
Katō was born as Hattori Sokichi, the second son of a former samurai retainer of the Owari Tokugawa domain in Nagoya, Owari Province, in the town of Saya, Ama District in what is now part of the city of Aisai, Aichi Prefecture. He was adopted by Katō Bunhei at the age of 13, and attended the University of Tokyo, from which he graduated at the top of his class from the Law Department in 1881, specializing in English common law. After graduation, he worked as an employee of Mitsubishi zaibatsu, and was sent to London for two years. On his return to Japan in 1885, he became an assistant manager at the Mitsubishi head office in Marunouchi, Tokyo. In 1886, he married Haruji, the eldest daughter of Iwasaki Yatarō, the president of Mitsubishi.

== Career ==
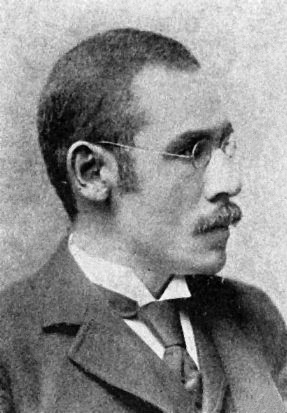
Katō Takaaki

In 1887, Katō became private secretary to Ōkuma Shigenobu, who was then Minister of Foreign Affairs, and worked with Ōkuma on the revision of the unequal treaties. Subsequently, he served as director of the Banking Bureau in the Finance Ministry.

From 1894 to 1899, he served as envoy to the United Kingdom, and in 1900, during the 4th Itō administration, he became Foreign Minister; however, the Ito administration remained in office only a few months. During his period in the United Kingdom and in the Foreign Ministry, he helped lay the foundations for the Anglo-Japanese Alliance, which was concluded in 1902. In 1902 he was elected a member of the House of Representatives in the Diet from Kōchi Prefecture.

Appointed again as Foreign Minister in the Saionji cabinet (1906), he resigned after a brief interval, being opposed to the nationalization of the private railways, which the cabinet approved. He then remained without office until 1908, when he accepted the post of ambassador in London. He received an honorary GCMG, and earned the reputation of being one of the strongest among the junior statesmen. He resigned his post as ambassador in December 1912, and again served as Foreign Minister in the 3rd Katsura and 2nd Ōkuma administrations, but soon resigned. He created a Constitutionalist party, becoming its president in 1913, and joined the cabinet as Foreign Minister in April 1914.

He was thus foreign minister at the outbreak of World War I, and in the words of Hew Strachan (The First World War, p. 72): "Of all the world's statesmen in 1914, Katō proved the most adroit at using war for the purposes of policy. Domestically he exploited it to assert the dominance of the Foreign Ministry and of the cabinet in the making of Japan's foreign policy. Internationally he took the opportunity to redefine Japan's relationship with China. In doing so he was not simply outflanking the extremists opposed to him; he was also honouring his own belief that Japan should be a great power like those of Europe."

Katō's decision that Japan should enter World War I greatly angered the genrō, who had not been consulted, and who therefore felt that their power and authority were being slighted. In addition, Katō created considerable controversy in January 1915, when he issued the Twenty-One Demands to China, which sparked a major international incident and considerable opposition domestically.

== Premiership (1924–1926) ==
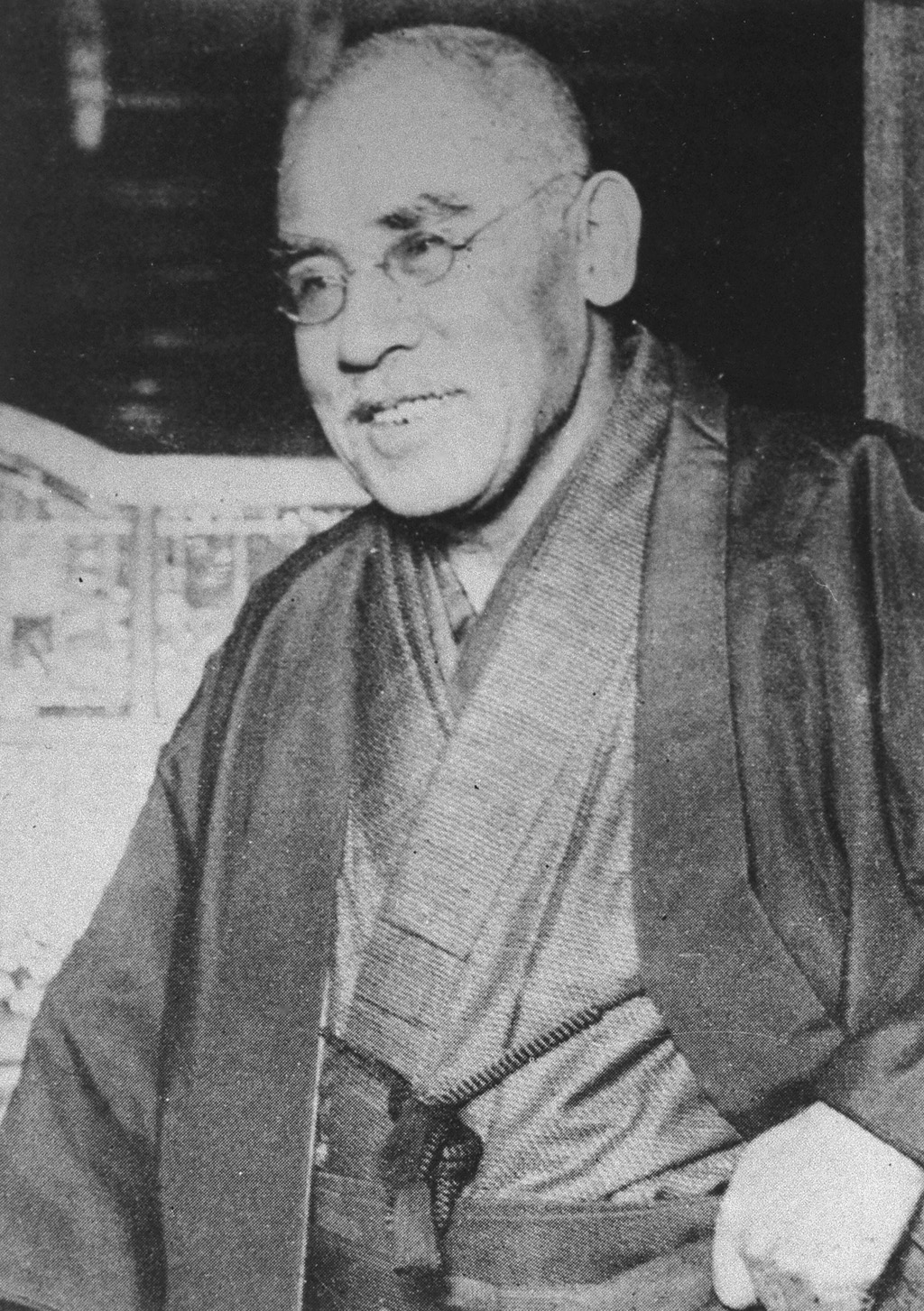
- Katō before 1926
- Premiership of Katō Takaaki; 11 June 1924 – 28 January 1926
- Monarch: Emperor Taishō
- Cabinet: Katō Takaaki Cabinet
- Party: Kenseikai
- Election: 1924
- Seat: Naikaku Sōri Daijin Kantei
- Emblem of the Government of Japan

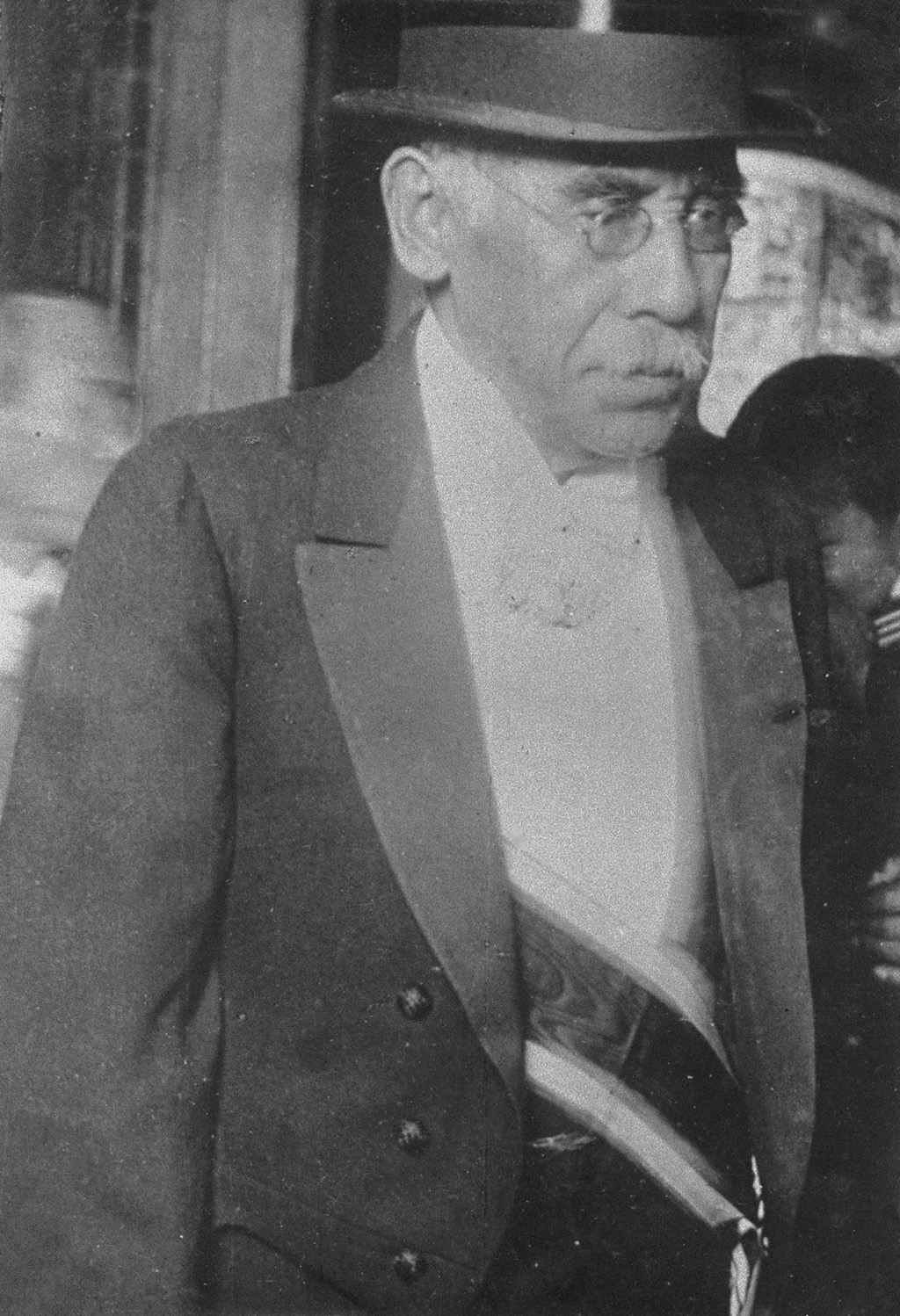
Katō Takaaki in a suit

In 1915, Katō was selected as a member of the House of Peers by Imperial command. He became president of the conservative Kenseikai political party in the following year, whose policies he greatly influenced with his opposition to the genrō, support of the constitution and support for extension of popular suffrage.

Katō was appointed Prime Minister of Japan from 1924 until his death in early 1926. His cabinet was nicknamed the "Goken Sanpa Naikaku" (Cabinet based on the three pro-Constitution factions), which, despite its coalition nature, was able to enact significant legislation. In 1925, Katō had the General Election Law enacted, which extended the vote to all male citizens over the age of 25. He also ratified the Peace Preservation Law, which suppressed leftist political organizations, and concluded the Soviet–Japanese Basic Convention. He also initiated universal military service. Katō strove to reduce government spending, but also suffered considerable personal criticism for his family links with Mitsubishi.

== Death ==
Katō Takaaki died in office from pneumonia in 1926, aged 66.

== Honours ==
From the corresponding article in the Japanese Wikipedia

- Grand Cordon of the Order of the Sacred Treasure (28 December 1902)
- Baron (24 August 1911)
- Viscount (14 July 1916)
- Grand Cordon of the Order of the Rising Sun with Paulownia Flowers (14 July 1916)
- Grand Cordon of the Order of the Chrysanthemum (28 January 1926; posthumous)
- Count (28 January 1926; posthumous)

== See also ==
- History of Japan

== Notes ==
Political offices
Preceded by Aoki Shūzō	Minister of Foreign Affairs; 1900–1901	Succeeded by Sone Arasuke
Preceded by Komura Jutarō	Minister of Foreign Affairs; 1906	Succeeded by Saionji Kinmochi
Preceded by Katsura Tarō	Minister of Foreign Affairs; 1913	Succeeded by Makino Nobuaki
Preceded by Makino Nobuaki	Minister of Foreign Affairs; 1914–1915	Succeeded by Ōkuma Shigenobu
Preceded by Kiyoura Keigo	Prime Minister of Japan; 1924–1926	Succeeded by Wakatsuki Reijirō
