= Yoshito Okuda =

Japanese mayor (1870–1917)

- 奥田 義人
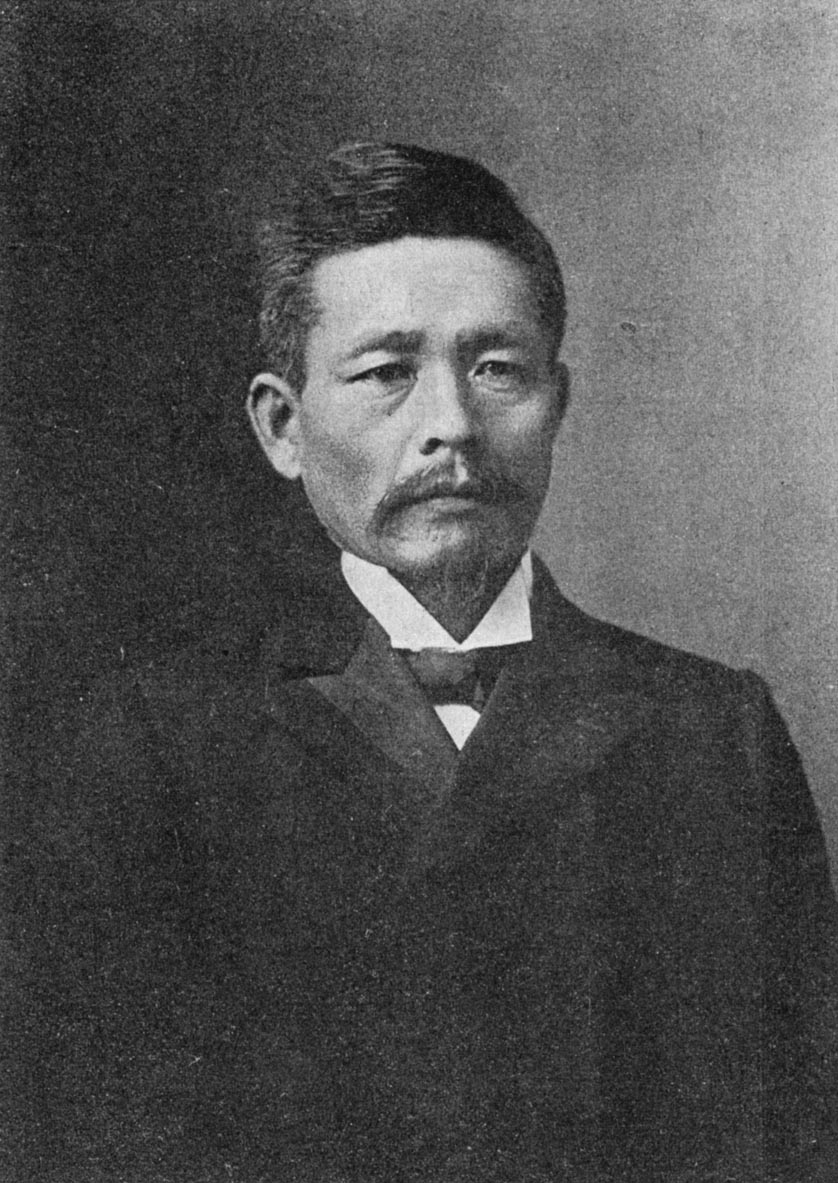

Mayor of Tokyo
- In office 15 June 1915 – 21 August 1917
- Preceded by: Sakatani Yoshirō
- Succeeded by: Tajiri Inajirō

Minister of Justice
- In office 6 March 1914 – 16 April 1914
- Prime Minister: Yamamoto Gonnohyōe
- Preceded by: Matsuda Masahisa
- Succeeded by: Yukio Ozaki

Minister of Education
- In office 20 February 1913 – 6 March 1914
- Prime Minister: Yamamoto Gonnohyōe
- Preceded by: Shibata Kamon
- Succeeded by: Ōoka Ikuzō

Member of the House of Peers
- In office 27 May 1912 – 21 August 1917 Nominated by the Emperor

Member of the House of Representatives
- In office 1 March 1903 – 27 March 1908
- Preceded by: Tomohiro Hirai
- Succeeded by: Yoshiyuki Kinoshita
- Constituency: Tottori City

Personal details
- Born: 31 July 1860 Tottori, Inaba, Japan
- Died: 21 August 1917 (aged 57) Tokyo, Japan
- Party: Rikken Seiyūkai
- Education: Tokyo Imperial University

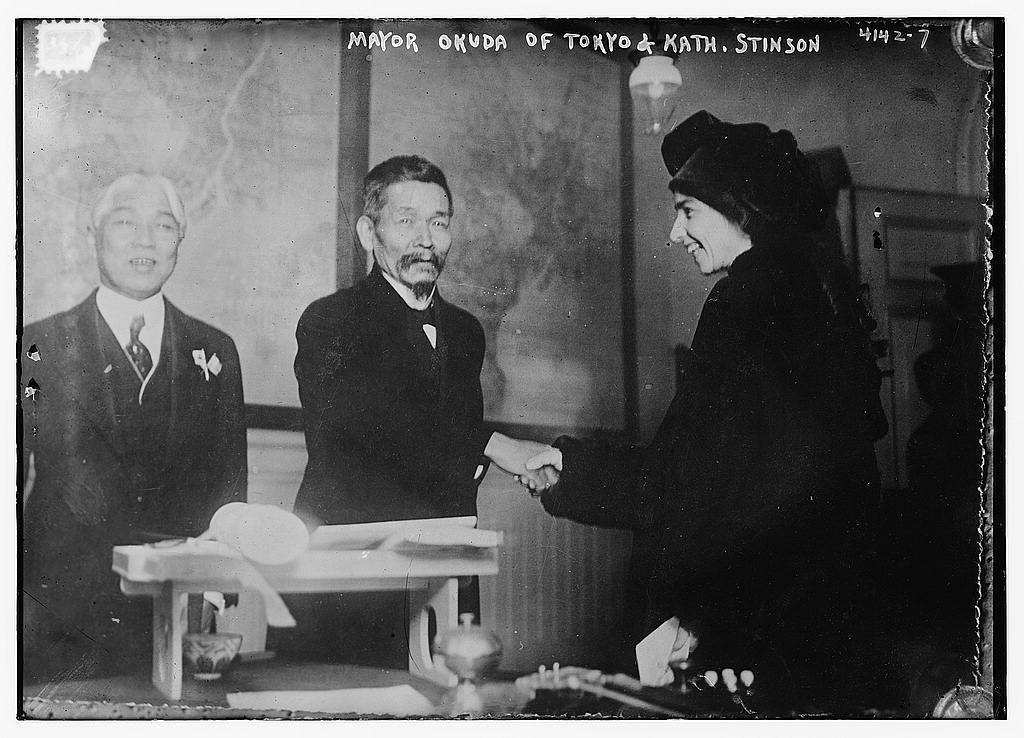
Yoshito Okuda, mayor of Tokyo with Katherine Stinson in 1916 or 1917

Baron Yoshito Okuda (31 July 1870 – 21 August 1917) was a Japanese politician who served as the Mayor of Tokyo from 15 June 1915, until his death on 21 August 1917.
