= Katsura Tarō =

Japanese general and politician (1848–1913)

Junior First Rank Prince Katsura Tarō CSOC GCSOC GCPO OPC GCRE SANB GCB
- 桂 太郎
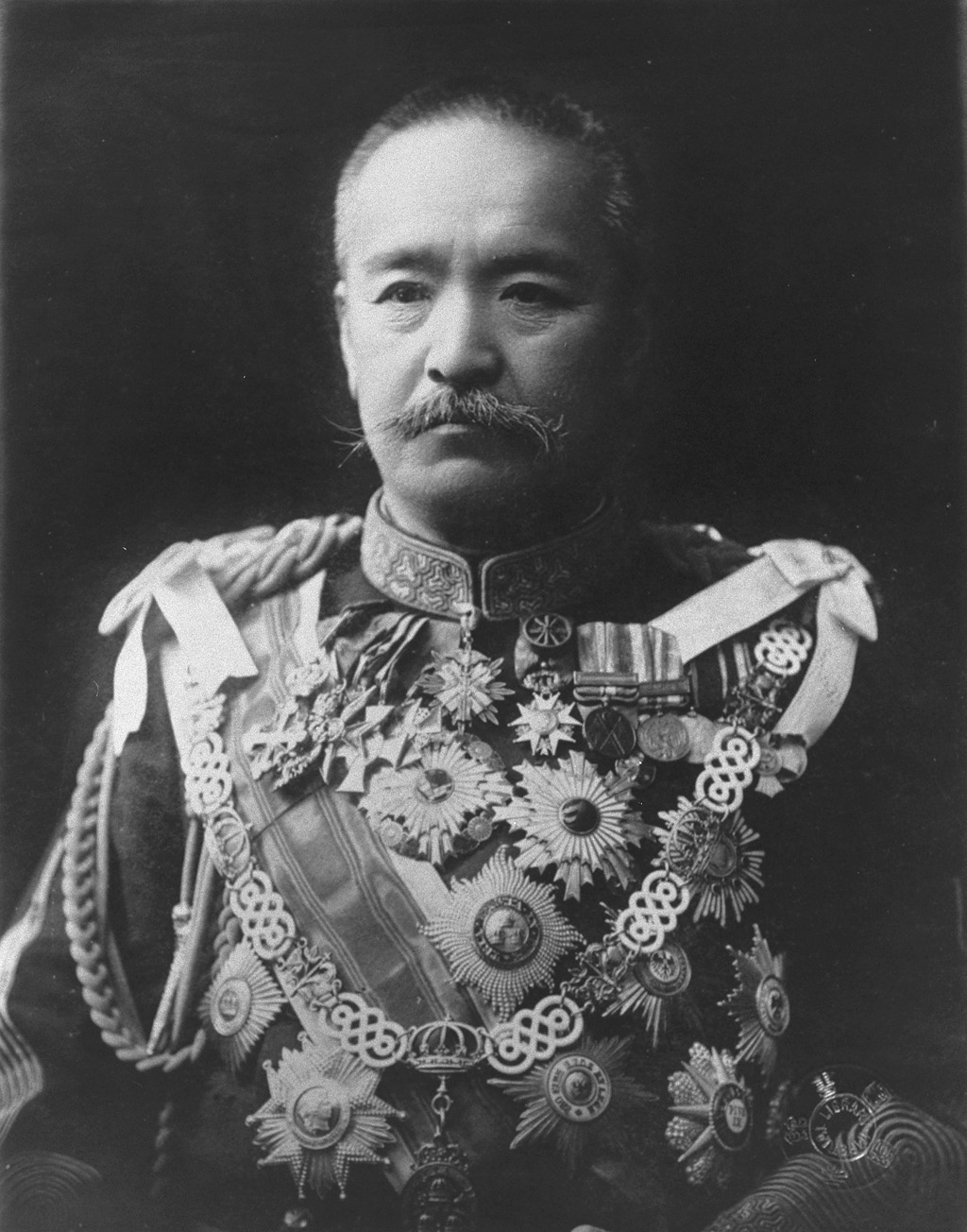

Prime Minister of Japan
- In office 21 December 1912 – 20 February 1913
- Monarch: Taishō
- Preceded by: Saionji Kinmochi
- Succeeded by: Yamamoto Gonnohyōe
- In office 14 July 1908 – 30 August 1911
- Monarch: Meiji
- Preceded by: Saionji Kinmochi
- Succeeded by: Saionji Kinmochi
- In office 2 June 1901 – 7 January 1906
- Monarch: Meiji
- Preceded by: Itō Hirobumi; Saionji Kinmochi (acting)
- Succeeded by: Saionji Kinmochi

2nd Governor-General of Taiwan
- In office 2 June 1896 – 14 October 1896
- Monarch: Meiji
- Preceded by: Kabayama Sukenori
- Succeeded by: Nogi Maresuke
Additional positions
Minister for Foreign Affairs
In office 21 December 1912 – 29 January 1913
| Prime Minister | Himself |
| Preceded by | Uchida Kōsai |
| Succeeded by | Katō Takaaki |
Lord Keeper of the Privy Seal
In office 21 August 1912 – 21 December 1912
| Monarch | Taishō |
| Preceded by | Tokudaiji Sanetsune |
| Succeeded by | Prince Fushimi Sadanaru |
Grand Chamberlain to the Emperor
In office 13 August 1912 – 21 December 1912
| Monarch | Taishō |
| Preceded by | Tokudaiji Sanetsune |
| Succeeded by | Takatsukasa Hiromichi |
Minister of Finance
In office 14 July 1908 – 30 August 1911
| Prime Minister | Himself |
| Preceded by | Matsuda Masahisa |
| Succeeded by | Yamamoto Tatsuo |
Minister of Education
In office 14 December 1905 – 7 January 1906
| Prime Minister | Himself |
| Preceded by | Kubota Yuzuru |
| Succeeded by | Saionji Kinmochi (acting); Makino Nobuaki |
Minister of Home Affairs
In office 22 October 1903 – 20 February 1904
| Prime Minister | Himself |
| Preceded by | Kodama Gentarō |
| Succeeded by | Yoshikawa Akimasa |
Minister of the Army
In office 12 January 1898 – 23 December 1900
| Prime Minister | Itō Hirobumi; Ōkuma Shigenobu; Yamagata Aritomo; Itō Hirobumi |
| Preceded by | Takashima Tomonosuke |
| Succeeded by | Kodama Gentarō |

Member of the House of Peers
- In office 21 September 1907 – 11 October 1913 Hereditary peerage

Personal details
- Born: 4 January 1848 Hagi, Nagato, Japan
- Died: 10 October 1913 (aged 65) Mita, Tokyo, Japan
- Cause of death: Stomach cancer
- Resting place: Shōin shrine, Tokyo
- Party: Rikken Dōshikai (1913)
- Other political affiliations: Independent (1896–1913)
- Spouse: Katsura Kanako (m. 1891)
- Profession: Soldier and politician
- Awards: See Decorations
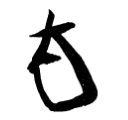
- Signature

Military service
- Allegiance: Empire of Japan
- Branch/service: Imperial Japanese Army
- Years of service: 1870–1901
- Rank: General
- Commands: IJA 3rd Division
- Battles/wars: Boshin War; First Sino-Japanese War

Prince Katsura Tarō (桂 太郎; 4 January 1848 – 10 October 1913) was a Japanese statesman and general who served as prime minister of Japan from 1901 to 1906, from 1908 to 1911, and from 1912 to 1913. He was a genrō, or senior statesman who helped dictate policy during the Meiji era, and is the second-longest serving Japanese prime minister after Shinzo Abe, serving for a combined total of 7 years and 330 days.

Born in the Choshu Domain to a samurai family, Katsura participated in the Boshin War that led to the Meiji Restoration in 1868. He spent several years studying military science in Germany, and became a protégé of Yamagata Aritomo. He distinguished himself in the First Sino-Japanese War, then served as governor-general of Taiwan and later as minister of war from 1898 to 1901, when he was appointed prime minister. Katsura's relatively stable tenure saw Japan's victory in the Russo-Japanese War before he was forced to resign in 1906 amid public outrage at the government's failure to secure an indemnity from Russia. He returned as premier in 1908, and showed authoritarian tendencies in the crackdown on the High Treason Incident of 1910, which saw the mass arrest of leftists and which was followed by the establishment of the Special Higher Police in 1911. In 1910, Korea was annexed by Japan. After Emperor Meiji's death in 1912, Katsura became prime minister again, which triggered the Taisho Political Crisis. He resigned three months later after a vote of no confidence.

== Early life ==
Katsura was born on 4 January 1848 in Hagi, Nagato Province (present-day Yamaguchi Prefecture) as the eldest son of horse guard Katsura Yoichiemon into a samurai family of the Chōshū Domain. As a youth, Katsura joined the movement against the Tokugawa shogunate and participated in the Boshin War that led to the Meiji Restoration in 1868.

== Army career ==
The new Meiji government considered that Katsura displayed great talent, and in 1870 sent him to Germany to study military science. He served as military attaché at the Japanese embassy in Germany from 1875 to 1878 and again from 1884 to 1885. On his return to Japan, he was promoted to major general. He served in several key positions within the Imperial Japanese Army, and in 1886 was appointed Vice-Minister of War.

During the First Sino-Japanese War (1894–1895) Katsura commanded the IJA 3rd Division under his mentor, Field Marshal Yamagata Aritomo. During the war, his division made a memorable march in the depth of winter from the north-east shore of the Yellow Sea to Haicheng, finally occupying Niuchwang, and effecting a junction with the IJA 2nd Army which had moved up the Liaodong Peninsula.

== Political career ==
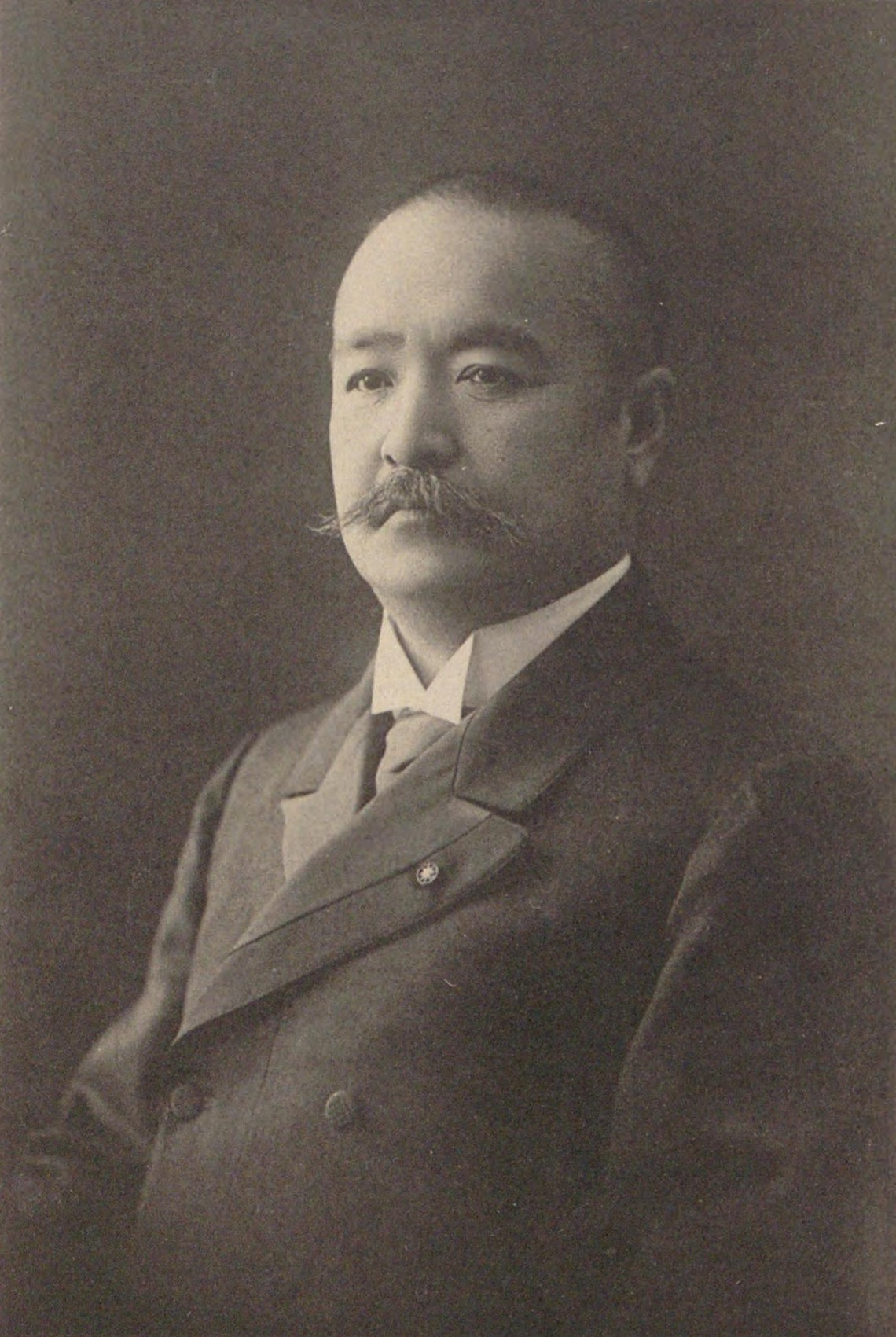
- Katsura in 1901
- Premiership of Katsura Tarō
- Monarchs: Emperor Meiji; Emperor Taishō
- Party: Military (Army); (1901–1906; 1908–1911); Independent (1912–1913)
- Seat: Naikaku Sōri Daijin Kantei
- First term 2 June 1901 – 7 January 1906
- Cabinet: First Katsura Cabinet
- Election: 1902; 1903; 1904
- Second term 14 July 1908 – 30 August 1911
- Cabinet: Second Katsura Cabinet
- Third term 21 December 1912 – 20 February 1913
- Cabinet: Third Katsura Cabinet
- Emblem of the Government of Japan

After the war, he was elevated with the title of shishaku (viscount) under the kazoku peerage system. He was appointed 2nd Governor-General of Taiwan from 2 June 1896, to October 1896.

In successive cabinets from 1898 to 1901, he served as Minister of War.

Katsura Tarō served as the 11th, 13th and 15th prime minister of Japan. His position as the longest-serving prime minister of Japan (total length) was surpassed by Shinzō Abe on 20 November 2019.

== First premiership (1901–1906) ==
Katsura became prime minister for the first time on 2 June 1901, and he retained the office for four and a half years to 7 January 1906, which was then a record in Japan. Japan emerged as a major imperialist power in East Asia. In terms of foreign affairs, it was marked by the Anglo-Japanese Alliance of 1902 and victory over the Russian Empire in the Russo-Japanese War of 1904–1905. During his first premiership, the Taft–Katsura agreement, accepting Japanese hegemony over Korea, was reached with the United States. Katsura received the Grand Cross of the Order of St Michael and St George from King Edward VII of the United Kingdom and was elevated to the rank of marquess by Emperor Meiji.

In terms of domestic policy, Katsura was a strictly conservative politician who attempted to distance himself from the Imperial Diet and party politics. His political views mirrored that of former prime minister Yamagata Aritomo in that he viewed that his sole responsibility was to the Emperor. He vied for control of the government with the Rikken Seiyūkai, the majority party of the lower house, headed by his archrival, Marquess Saionji Kinmochi.

In January 1906, Katsura resigned the premiership to Saionji Kinmochi over the unpopular Treaty of Portsmouth (1905), ending the war between Japan and Russia. However, his resignation was part of a "back door deal," brokered by Hara Takashi to alternate power between Saionji and Hara.

On 1 April 1906, he was awarded the Grand Cordon of the Supreme Order of the Chrysanthemum.

== Second premiership (1908–1911) ==
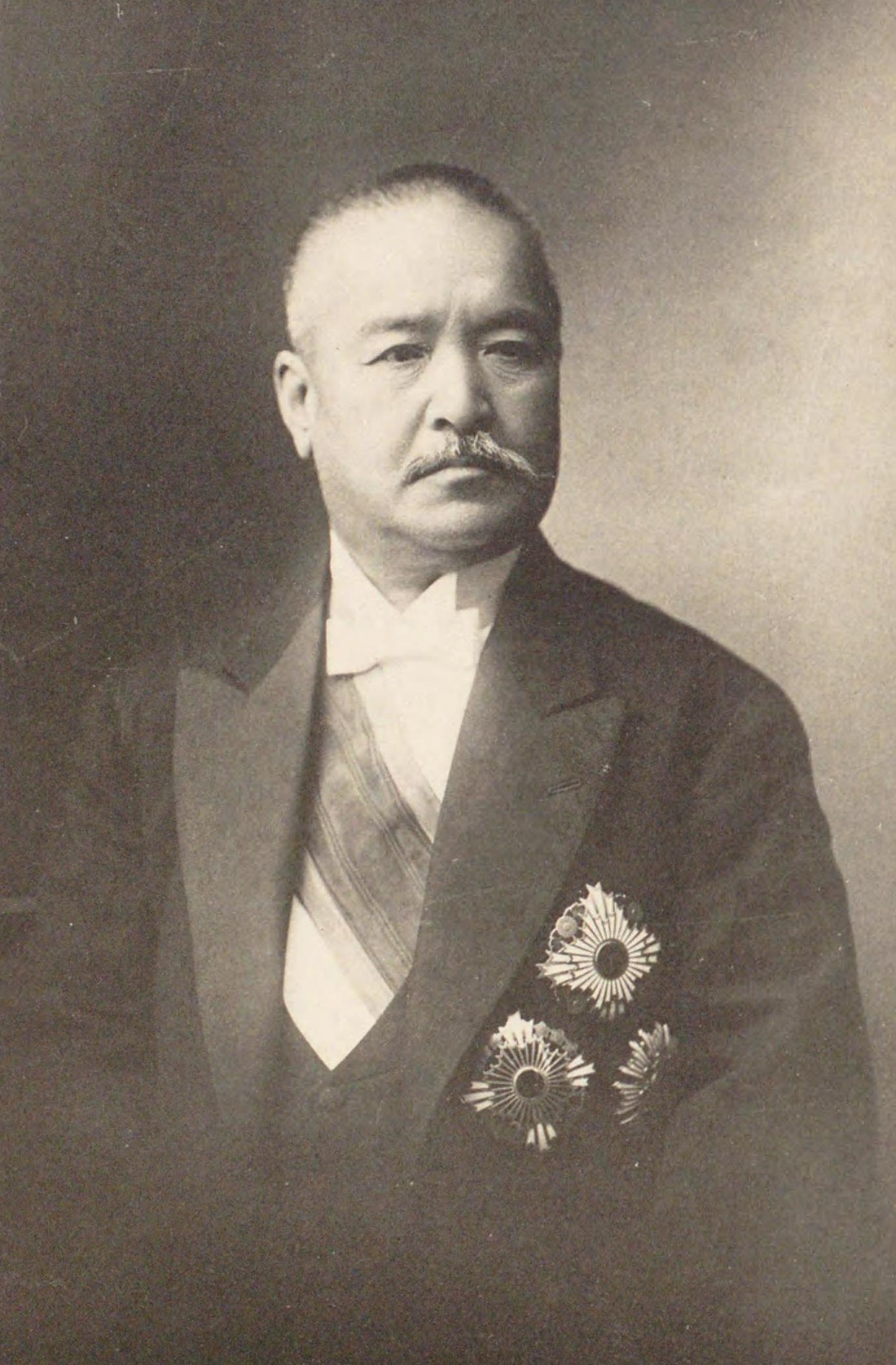
Katsura Tarō

Katsura returned as prime minister from 14 July 1908, to 30 August 1911. His second premiership was noteworthy for the Japan–Korea Annexation Treaty of 1910 to colonize Korea. He also promulgated the Factory Act in 1911, the first act for the purpose of labor protection in Japan.

Katsura was increasingly unpopular during his second premiership over public perception that he was using his office to further both his personal fortune and the interests of the military (gunbatsu) over the welfare of the people. He also faced growing public dissatisfaction over the persistence of the hanbatsu domainal based politics.

After his resignation, he became a kōshaku (公爵 = prince), Lord Keeper of the Privy Seal of Japan and one of the genrō.

== Third premiership (1912–1913) ==
Katsura's brief reappointment as prime minister third time from 21 December 1912, to 20 February 1913, sparked widespread riots in what became known as the Taisho Political Crisis. His appointment was viewed as a plot by the genrō to overthrow the Meiji Constitution. However, rather than compromising, Katsura created his own political party, the Rikken Dōshikai (Constitutional Association of Allies) in an effort to establish his own support base after his third premiership.

However, faced with a no-confidence motion, the first successful one in Japanese history, and the loss of the support of his backers, he was forced to resign in February 1913. He was succeeded by Yamamoto Gonnohyōe.

== Death ==
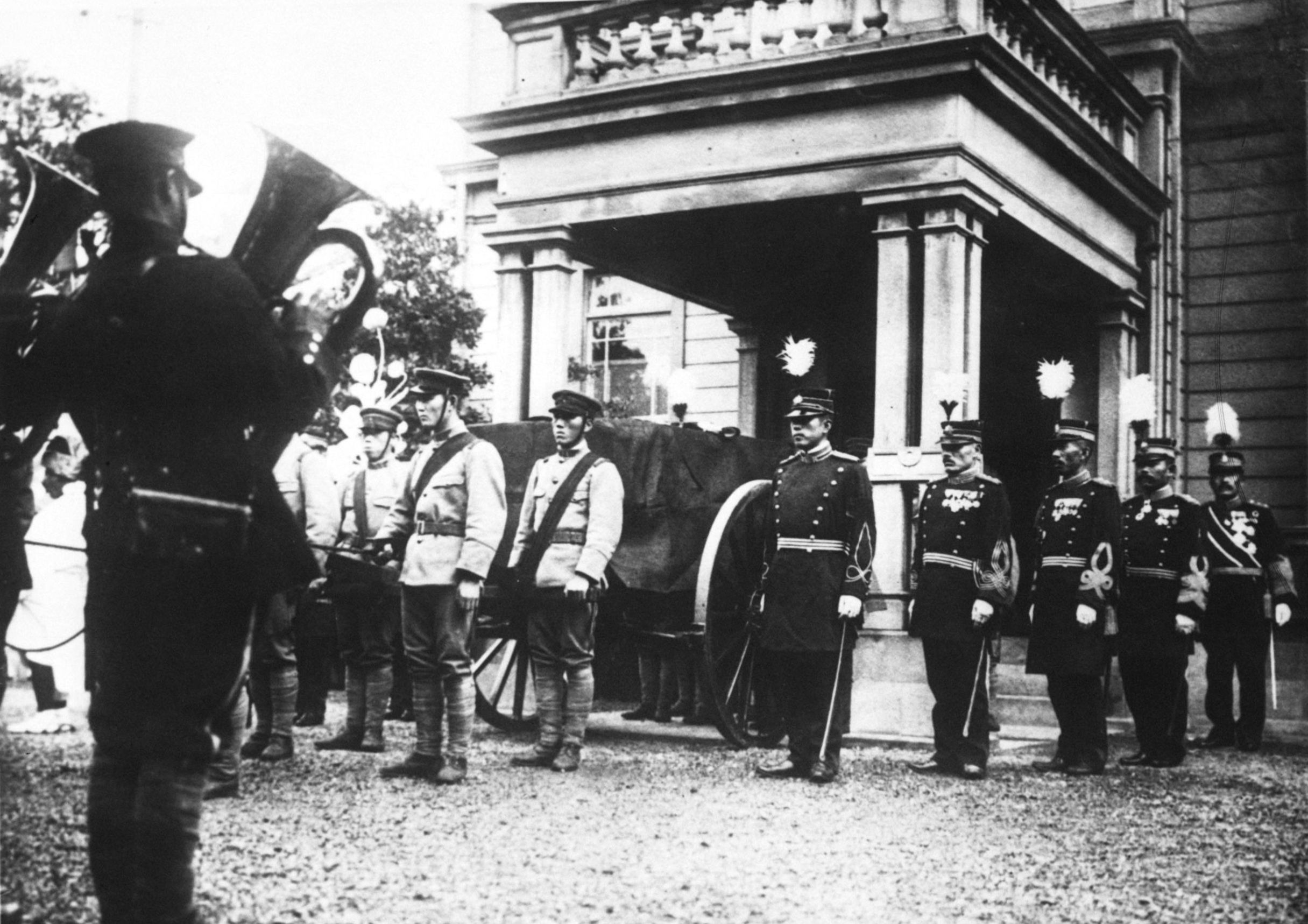
The funeral carriage leaving Katsura's residence en route to Zōjō-ji in October 1913

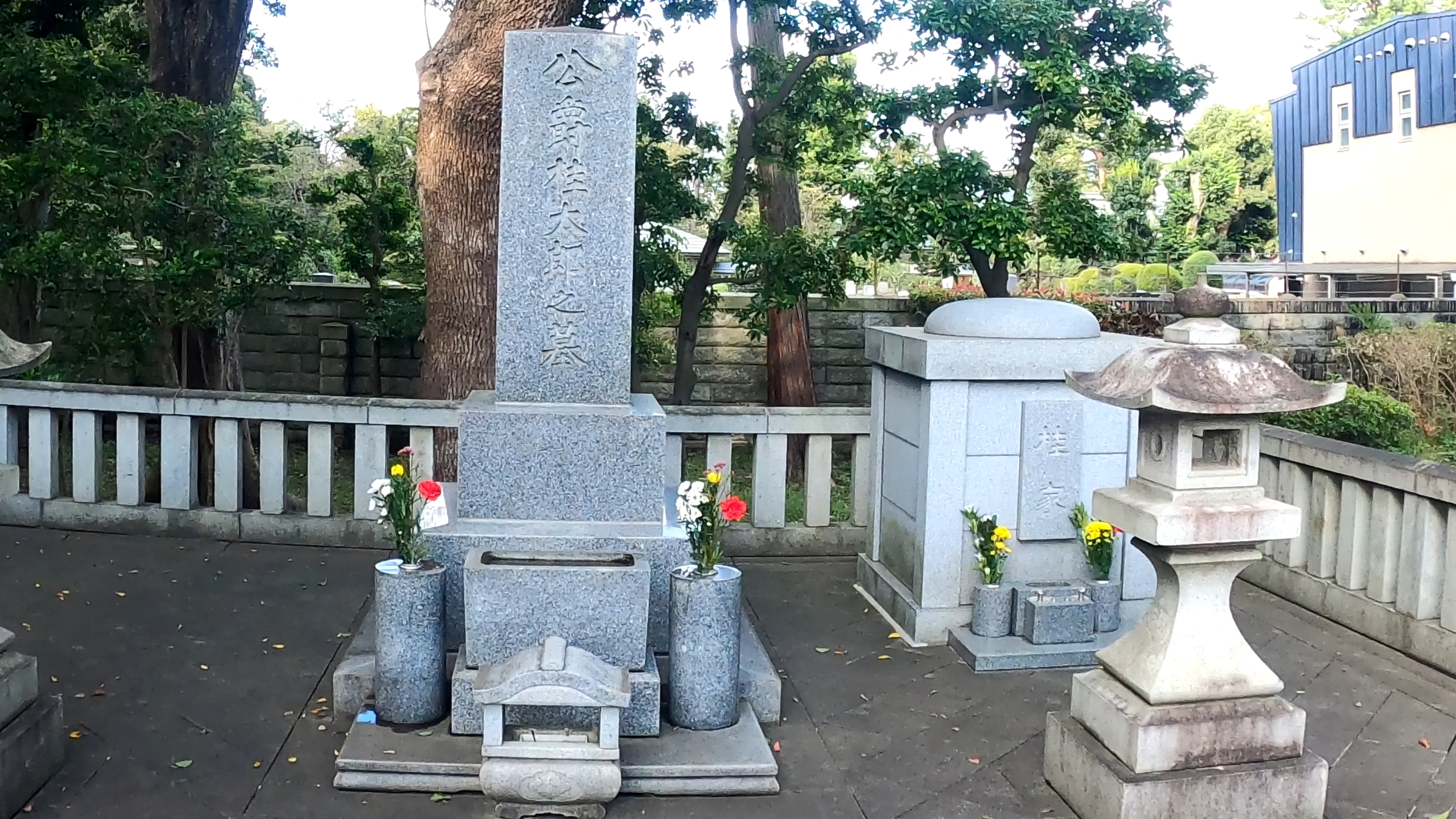
Katsura's grave in Tokyo

Katsura died of stomach cancer eight months later on 10 October 1913, aged 65. His funeral was held at the temple of Zōjō-ji in Shiba, Tokyo and his grave is at the Shōin Jinja, in Setagaya.

== Honors ==
From the corresponding article in the Japanese Wikipedia

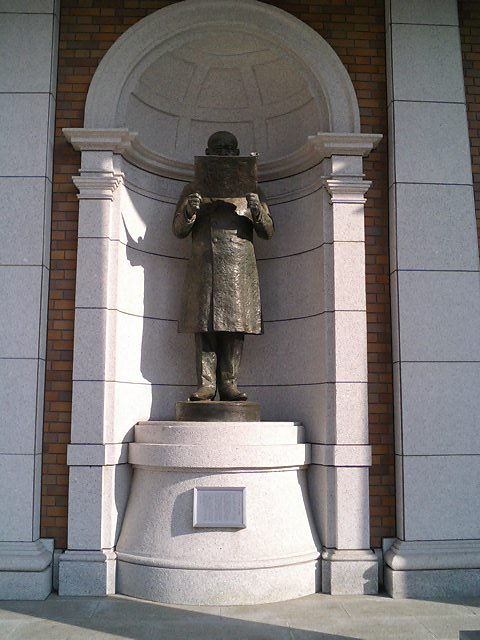
A bronze statue of Katsura Tarō on the top of the stairs of Takushoku University in Hachiōji, Tokyo

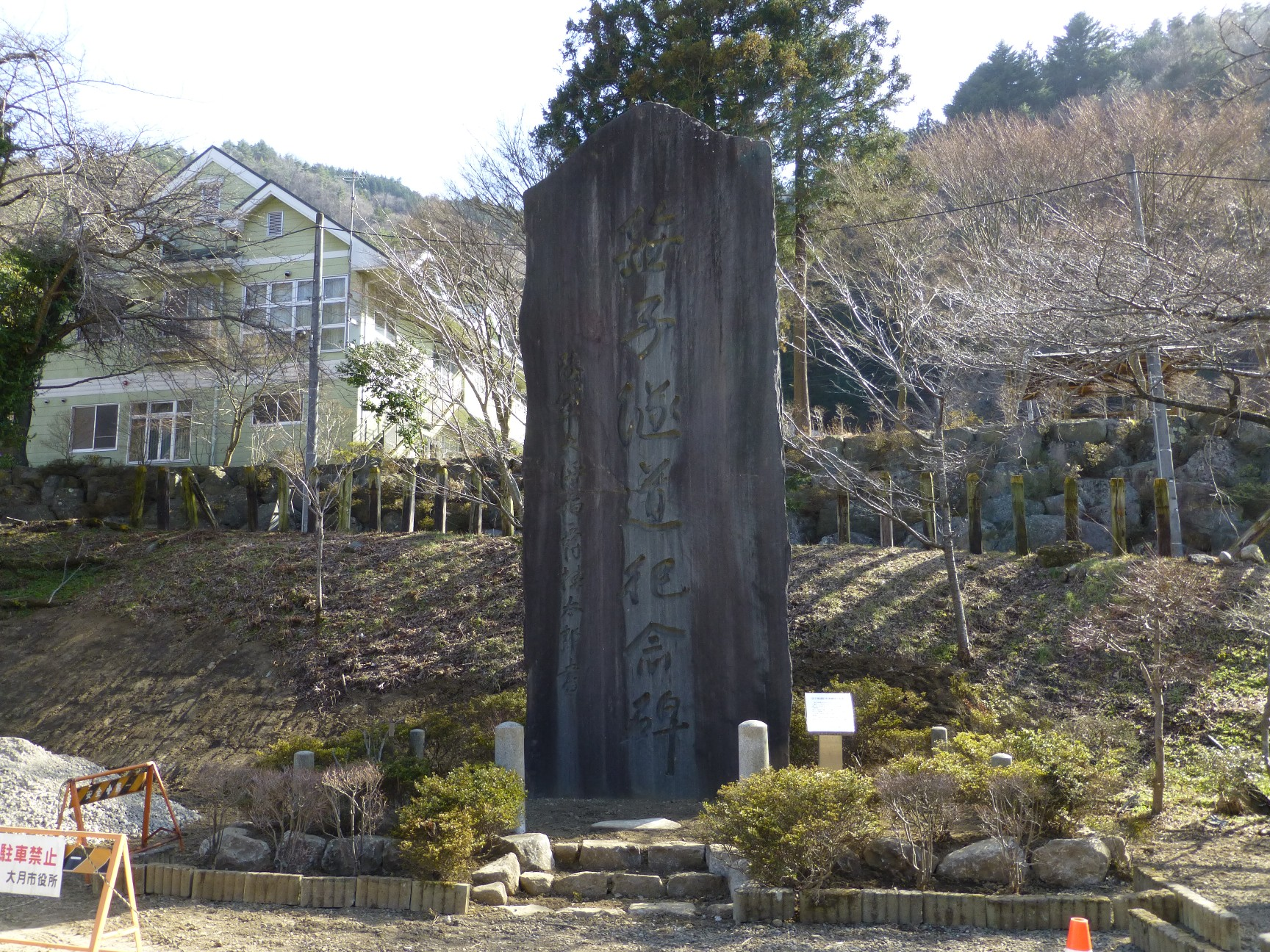
A memorial stone that commemorates the opening of Sasago railway tunnel. The epigraph was written by Taro Katsura.

=== Titles ===
- Viscount (20 August 1895)
- Count (27 February 1902)
- Marquess (21 September 1907)
- Prince (21 April 1911)
- Genrō (30 August 1911)

=== Decorations ===
==== Japanese ====
- Grand Cordon of the Order of the Sacred Treasure (20 August 1895; Second Class: 11 May 1891)
- Order of the Golden Kite, 3rd class (20 August 1895)
- Grand Cordon of the Order of the Rising Sun (27 December 1901; Third Class: 19 November 1885; Fourth Class: 26 May 1880)
- Grand Cordon of the Order of the Paulownia Flowers (10 October 1913; posthumous)
- Collar of the Order of the Chrysanthemum (10 October 1913, Awarded a few hours before his death; Grand Cordon: 1 April 1906)

==== Foreign ====
- Russian Empire:
  - Knight of the Order of the White Eagle (1 May 1899)
  - Knight of the Order of St. Alexander Nevsky in Brilliants (11 November 1911)
- German Empire:
  - Grand Cross of the Order of the Red Eagle (4 October 1906; Knight 1st Class: 3 February 1900)
  - Knight of the Order of Merit of the Prussian Crown (19 September 1912)
  - Duchy of Brunswick: Knight 1st Class of the Order of Henry the Lion (1 July 1910)
- France: Grand Officer of the Legion d'Honneur (16 April 1901)
- United Kingdom: Honorary Knight Grand Cross of the Order of the Bath (GCB) (8 July 1905)
- Holy See: Knight Grand Cross of the Order of Pius IX (5 June 1906)
- Korean Empire: Grand Cordon of the Order of the Golden Ruler (21 December 1907)
- Qing dynasty: Order of the Double Dragon, Class I Grade II (21 December 1907; Class I Grade III: 18 December 1899)

Political offices
| Preceded by Saionji Kinmochi | Prime Minister of Japan; 21 December 1912 – 20 February 1913 | Succeeded by Yamamoto Gonnohyōe |
| Preceded by Tokudaiji Sanetsune | Lord Keeper of the Privy Seal; 21 August 1912 – 21 December 1912 | Succeeded by Prince Fushimi Sadanaru |
| Preceded by Uchida Kosai | Foreign Minister (acting); 21 December 1912 – 29 January 1913 | Succeeded by Katō Takaaki |
| Preceded by Saionji Kinmochi | Prime Minister of Japan; 14 July 1908 – 30 August 1911 | Succeeded by Saionji Kinmochi |
| Preceded by Masahisa Matsuda | Finance Minister; 14 July 1908 – 30 August 1911 | Succeeded by Yamamoto Tatsuo |
| Preceded by Yuzuru Kubota | Minister of Education; 14 December 1905 – 7 January 1906 | Succeeded by Saionji Kinmochi |
| Preceded by Kodama Gentarō | Home Minister; 12 October 1903 – 20 February 1904 | Succeeded by Yoshikawa Akimasa |
| Preceded by Itō Hirobumi | Prime Minister of Japan; 2 June 1901 – 7 July 1906 | Succeeded by Saionji Kinmochi |
| Preceded by Takashima Tomonosuke | Minister of War; 12 January 1898 – 23 December 1900 | Succeeded by Kodama Gentarō |
| Preceded by Kabayama Sukenori | Governor General of Taiwan; 2 June 1896 – 14 October 1896 | Succeeded by Nogi Maresuke |
