= Inukai Tsuyoshi =

Prime Minister of Japan from 1931 to 1932

Senior Second Rank Inukai Tsuyoshi
- 犬養 毅
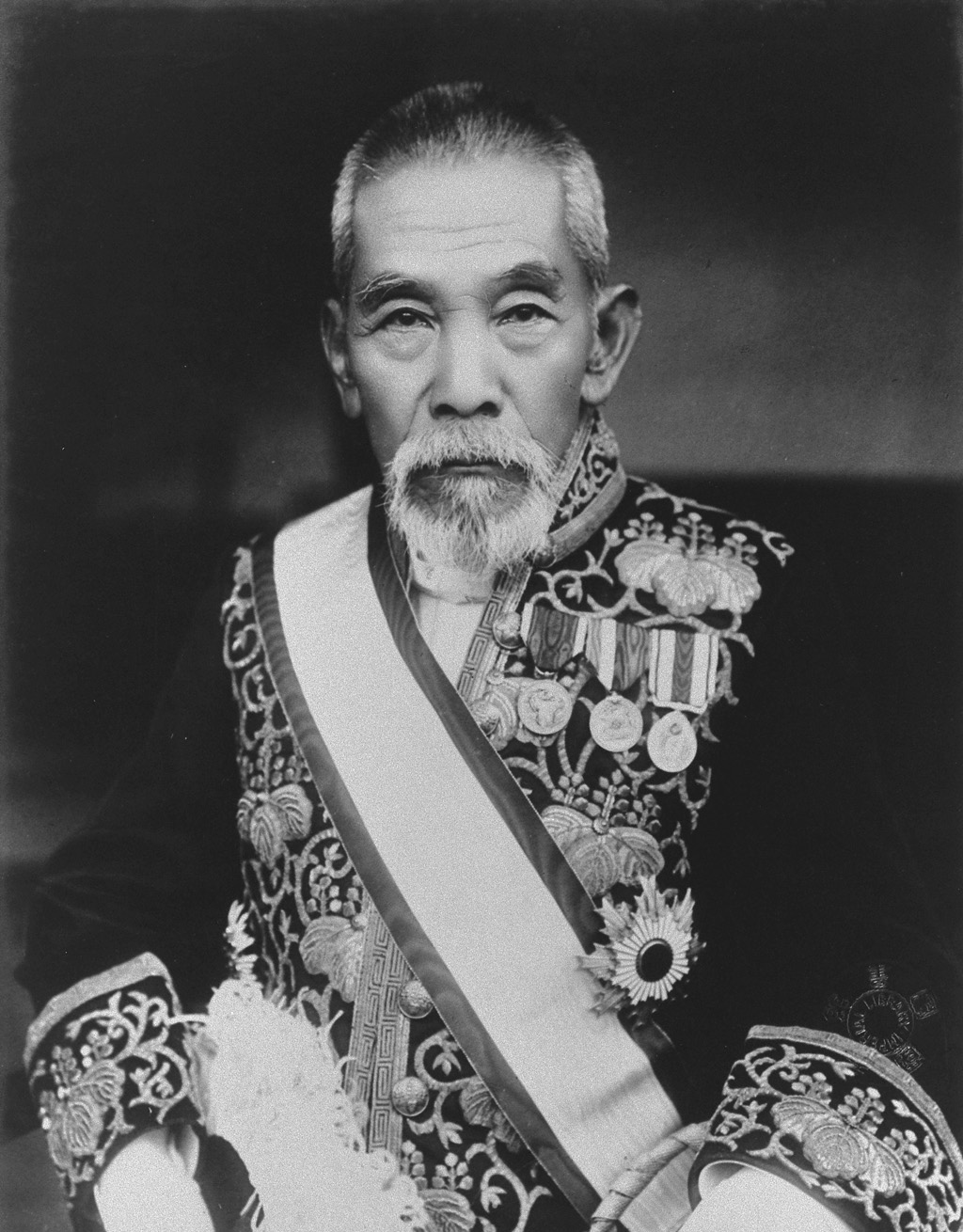

Prime Minister of Japan
- In office 13 December 1931 – 15 May 1932
- Monarch: Hirohito
- Preceded by: Wakatsuki Reijirō
- Succeeded by: Takahashi Korekiyo (acting); Saitō Makoto

President of the Rikken Seiyūkai
- In office October 1929 – May 1932
- Preceded by: Tanaka Giichi
- Succeeded by: Suzuki Kisaburō
Ministerial offices
Minister of Home Affairs
In office 16 March 1932 – 25 March 1932
Prime Minister	Himself
Preceded by	Nakahashi Tokugorō
Succeeded by	Suzuki Kisaburō
Minister for Foreign Affairs
In office 13 December 1931 – 14 January 1932
Prime Minister	Himself
Preceded by	Kijūrō Shidehara
Succeeded by	Kenkichi Yoshizawa
Minister of Communications
In office 11 June 1924 – 30 May 1925
Prime Minister	Katō Takaaki
Preceded by	Yoshirō Fujimura
Succeeded by	Adachi Kenzō
In office 2 September 1923 – 7 January 1924
Prime Minister	Yamamoto Gonnohyōe
Preceded by	Maeda Toshisada
Succeeded by	Yoshirō Fujimura
Minister of Education
In office 2 September 1923 – 6 September 1923
Prime Minister	Yamamoto Gonnohyōe
Preceded by	Kamata Eikichi
Succeeded by	Okano Keijirō
In office 27 October 1898 – 8 November 1898
Prime Minister	Ōkuma Shigenobu
Preceded by	Yukio Ozaki
Succeeded by	Kabayama Sukenori

Member of the House of Representatives; from Okayama
- In office 1 July 1890 – 15 May 1932
- Preceded by: Constituency established
- Succeeded by: Nishimura Tanjirō
- Constituency: 3rd district (1890–1902); Counties district (1902–1920); 4th district (1920–1928); 2nd district (1928–1932)

Personal details
- Born: 4 June 1855 Okayama, Bitchū, Japan
- Died: 15 May 1932 (aged 76) Nagatachō, Tokyo, Japan
- Resting place: Aoyama Cemetery
- Party: Rikken Seiyūkai (after 1924)
- Other political affiliations: CRP (1882–1894); CPP (1894–1896); Shimpotō (1896–1898); Kenseitō (1898–1900); Kensei Hontō (1900–1910); CNP (1910–1922); Kakushin Club (1922–1924)
- Spouse: Mita Chiyoko (m. 1891)
- Children: Takeru Inukai
- Education: Keio University
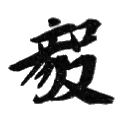
- Signature

Japanese name
- Kanji: 犬養 毅
- Hiragana: いぬかい つよし
Transcriptions
- Romanization: Inukai Tsuyoshi

Inukai Tsuyoshi (Japanese: 犬養 毅, 4 June 1855 – 15 May 1932) was a Japanese statesman who served as prime minister of Japan from 1931 to his assassination in 1932. At the age of 76, Inukai was Japan's second oldest-serving prime minister, after Kantarō Suzuki whose term ended at the age of 77.

== Early life and education ==
Inukai was born 4 June 1855, in Kawairi, Kayō, Bitchū Province (in present-day Okayama, Okayama Prefecture), the second son of Inukai Genzaemon, a samurai, district magistrate and local official (ōjōya). His family was a branch of the Itakura clan, and were originally given a status that allowed them to wear a katana by the Niwase Domain.

In 1876, Inukai travelled to Tokyo and subsequently graduated from the Keio Gijuku (now Keio University) where he specialized in Chinese studies. In his early career, Inukai worked as a journalist for the Yūbin Hōchi Shimbun (now a sports newspaper subsidiary of the Yomiuri Shimbun) and Akita Sakigake Shimpō. He went with the Imperial Japanese Army to the front during the Satsuma Rebellion as a reporter.

== Political career ==
Ōkuma Shigenobu invited Inukai to help form the Rikken Kaishintō political party in 1882, which supported liberal political causes, strongly opposed the domination of the government by members of the former Chōshū and Satsuma domains, and called for a British-style constitutional monarchy within the framework of a parliamentary democracy.

Inukai was first elected to the Lower House of the Imperial Diet in 1890, and was reelected 17 times, holding the same seat for 42 years until his death.

Inukai's first cabinet post was as Minister of Education in the first Ōkuma Shigenobu administration of 1898, succeeding Ozaki Yukio, who was forced to resign due to a speech that conservative elements in the Diet charged promoted republicanism. However, Ozaki's resignation did not end the crisis, which culminated with the fall of the Ōkuma administration, so Inukai's term lasted only eleven days. Inukai was a leading figure in the successors to the Rikken Kaishintō, the Shimpotō, Kenseitō and the Rikken Kokumintō, which eventually toppled the government of Katsura Tarō in 1913. During this time, his politics became increasingly conservative and he was associated with both leading figures from the Pan-Asian movement and with nationalists such as Tōyama Mitsuru. He was also a strong supporter of the Chinese republican movement, visiting China in 1907, and subsequently lending aid to Sun Yat-sen during the Xinhai Revolution of 1911 which overthrew the Qing dynasty. He later assisted Sun when Sun had to flee to Japan after his attempt to overthrow Yuan Shikai failed. Inukai had a deep respect for Chinese culture, and felt that Sino-Japanese cooperation was the cornerstone of Asian solidarity. Although in later years his vision of Sino-Japanese cooperation diverged greatly from Sun's, Inukai maintained close personal ties with many leading Chinese politicians. Inukai likewise supported the Vietnamese independence leader, Prince Cường Để, and invited him to Japan in 1915.

Inukai returned to the cabinet as Minister of Communications in the second Yamamoto Gonnohyōe administration from 1923 to 1924. He was concurrently Education Minister again for a four-day period in September 1923.

In 1922 the Rikken Kokumintō became the Kakushin Club, and joined forces with other minor parties to form the cabinet during the premiership of Katō Takaaki in 1924. During his time, Inukai served on the cabinet again as Minister of Communications. The Kakushin Club then merged with the Rikken Seiyūkai, and Inukai continued as a senior member.

In July 1929, Inukai travelled to Nanjing, China, with several other Japanese delegates at the invitation of Chinese government to a memorial service for Sun Yat-sen. The delegates later travelled to numerous other cities, and noted with concern the growing anti-Japanese sentiment. In 1929, after the sudden death of Tanaka Giichi, Inukai became president of the Rikken Seiyūkai. Inukai was an outspoken critic of Japan's signing of the London Naval Treaty, which reduced military spending. He supported the actions of the Imperial Japanese Army in invading Manchuria in 1931, and rejected criticism from the League of Nations over the Mukden Incident.

== Premiership (1931–1932) ==
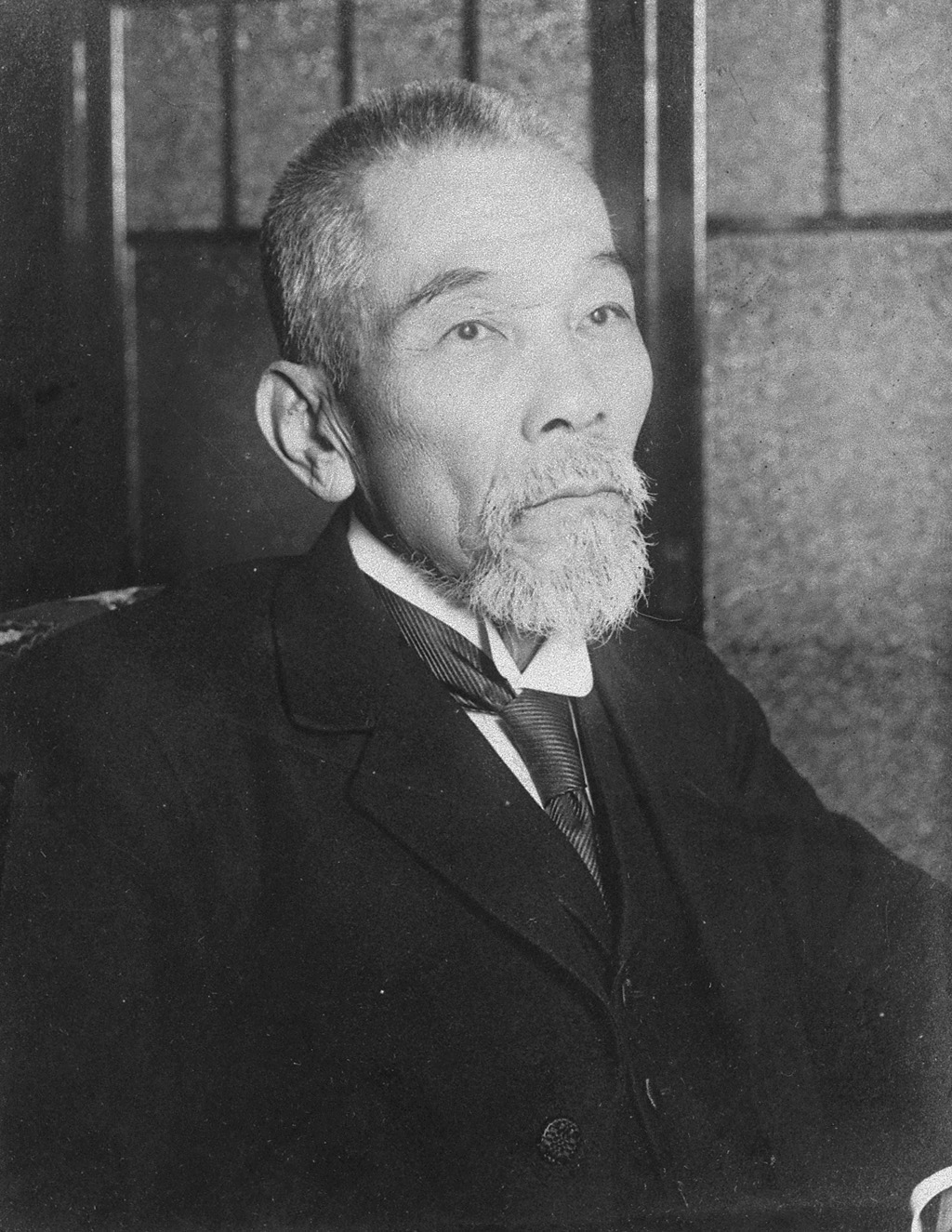
- Inukai, before 1932
- Premiership of Inukai Tsuyoshi; 13 December 1931 – 15 May 1932
- Monarch: Emperor Shōwa
- Cabinet: Inukai Cabinet
- Party: Rikken Seiyūkai
- Election: 1932
- Seat: Naikaku Sōri Daijin Kantei
- Constituency: Okayama 2nd
- Emblem of the Government of Japan

Following the resignation of the Wakatsuki administration over its failure to control the military and the failure of its economic policies, Saionji Kinmochi, Japan's sole surviving genrō, turned to Inukai to form a new government in 1931. Following his appointment, Inukai was instructed by Saionji to avoid drastic changes in either foreign policy or economics. Already disadvantaged by the fact that his Seiyukai was not the majority party in the Diet, he was also saddled with a cabinet composed of competing factions, ranging from his ultra-rightist Army Minister Sadao Araki to the liberal Finance Minister Takahashi Korekiyo. With a divided cabinet and a hostile Diet, Inukai governed with the assistance of the Privy Council, which passed emergency imperial edicts and budgetary measures to circumvent the normal Diet budgetary process.

Inukai immediately took steps to inflate the economy and to take Japan off the gold standard, implementing protectionist trade policies and attempting to stem Japan's trade deficit. These actions devaluated the yen, thus lowering the price of Japanese goods in world markets, and increasing exports.

However, Inukai was forced to accede to a request by the Imperial Japanese Army to dispatch additional troops to Manchuria and to Tianjin, despite instructions as late as 23 December 1931 from Emperor Hirohito to maintain international trust per the Nine-Power Treaty in not attacking China, and on 27 December 1931 not to authorize any moves by the Kwantung Army to occupy Jinzhou. However, by now the Imperial Japanese Army was completely beyond any civilian control and from January to March 1932 the conflict had spread to Shanghai with the 1st Shanghai Incident. During the 1932 General Election, buoyed by an upsurge in public opinion due to Japanese military successes in China, the Rikken Seiyukai won an overwhelming majority.

On 8 January 1932, a Korean independence activist named Lee Bong Chang attempted to assassinate Emperor Hirohito in the Sakuradamon Incident. Inukai and his cabinet immediately offered their resignations; however, Hirohito wished to downplay the incident and refused.

However, Inukai still came under strong criticism for his efforts to rein in the military, while reformists criticized him for not going far enough. Inukai's efforts to limit further troop deployments to China and to defuse the Shanghai Incident through negotiations with the Chinese government drew increasing ire from the general public as well as the militarists. This soon metamorphosed into terrorist activity with the League of Blood Incident in which extremists targeted wealthy businessmen and liberal politicians. The group chose twenty victims but succeeded in killing only two: former Finance Minister and head of the Rikken Minseitō, Junnosuke Inoue, and Director-General of Mitsui Holding Company, Dan Takuma.

On 1 March, the state of Manchukuo was formally proclaimed. Symbolically, Inukai withheld formal diplomatic recognition as a gesture of displeasure against the radical faction within the Imperial Japanese Army, and out of concern due to the rapidly worsening international relations with the United States, on which country Japan depended for much of its raw materials and capital investment.

== Assassination ==
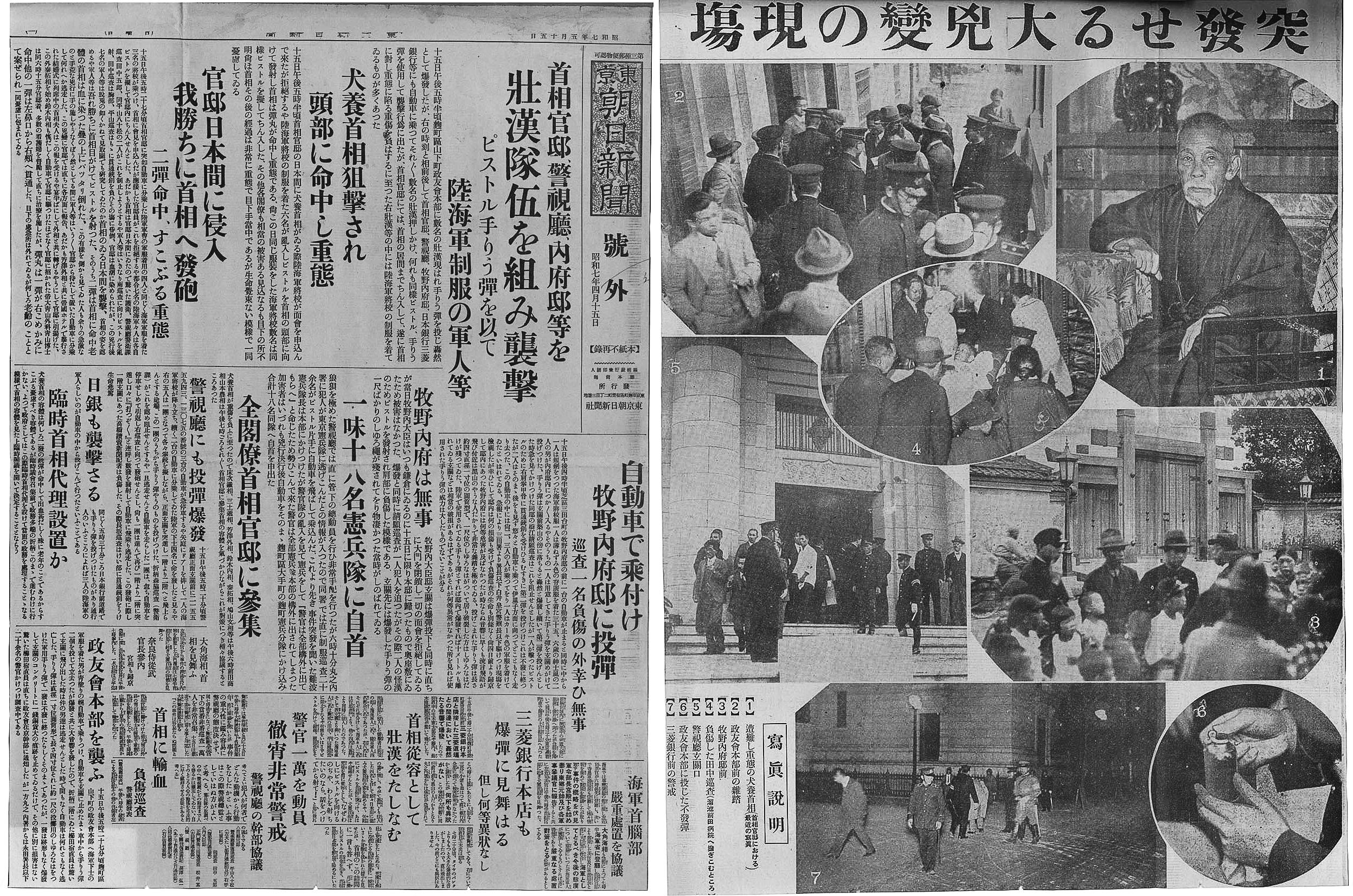
May 15 Incident reported in the Tokyo Asahi Shimbun

Inukai's struggle against the military led to his assassination during the May 15 Incident of 1932, which effectively marked the end of civilian political control over government decisions until after World War II. Inukai was shot by eleven junior Navy officers (most were just turning twenty years of age) in the Prime Minister's residence in Tokyo. Inukai's last words were roughly: If we could talk, you would understand (話せば分かる, hanaseba wakaru) to which his killers replied Dialogue is useless (問答無用, mondō muyō). The insurgents also attacked the residence of Makino Nobuaki, the Lord Keeper of the Privy Seal, the residence and office of Saionji Kinmochi, headquarters of the Rikken Seiyukai, and tossed hand grenades into Mitsubishi Bank headquarters in Tokyo, and several electrical transformer substations. The original assassination plan had included killing the English film star Charlie Chaplin – who had arrived in Japan on 14 May and was Inukai's guest – in the hope that this would provoke a war with the United States. However, at the time, Chaplin was watching a sumo wrestling match with the prime minister's son, Inukai Takeru, and thus escaped. Inukai's murderers received only light sentences for their actions.

Inukai's third son was writer, politician and post-war Minister of Justice Inukai Takeru, whose granddaughter is popular actress Sakura Ando. His son-in-law was noted diplomat Kenkichi Yoshizawa. Through Yoshizawa, his great-granddaughter was Sadako Ogata, who served as United Nations High Commissioner for Refugees from 1991 until 2001, and his great-grandson Yutaka Kawashima served as Grand Chamberlain to the Imperial Household.

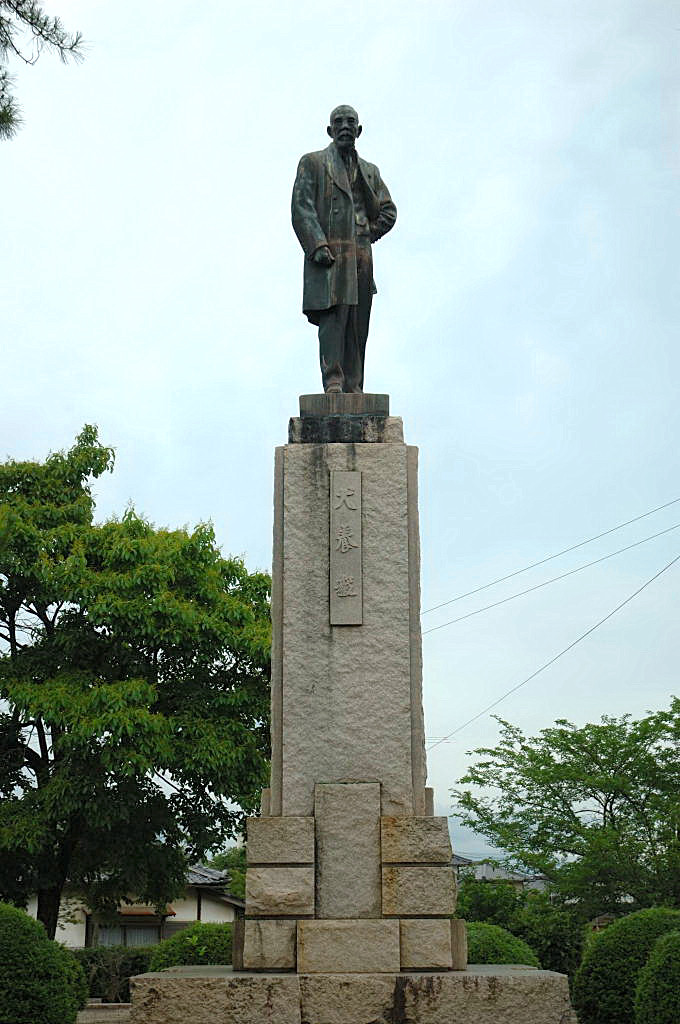
Statue of Inukai at Kibitsu Shrine in Bitchū

== Honours ==
From the corresponding article in the Japanese Wikipedia

- Senior Third Court Rank (正三位), 4 November 1898
- Order of the Sacred Treasure, Gold Rays with Neck Ribbon (3rd class), 18 June 1914
- Order of the Sacred Treasure, Gold and Silver Star (2nd class), 10 November 1915
- Order of the Rising Sun, Gold and Silver Star (2nd class), 1 April 1916
- Grand Cordon of the Order of the Rising Sun (1st class), 7 September 1920
- Order of the Rising Sun with Paulownia Flowers, 16 May 1932 (posthumous)
- Senior Second Court Rank (正二位), 16 May 1932 (posthumous)

== Family tree ==
INUKAI (犬養) Family Tree

INUKAI GENZAEMON; Retainer to the Itakura
INUKAI TSUYOSHI; 29th Prime Minister of Japan (1855–1932)	INUKAI CHIYOKO (née Mita) (1865–1952)
YOSHIZAWA KENKICHI; 46th Foreign Minister of Japan (1874–1965)	YOSHIZAWA MISAO (Inukai)	INUKAI NAKAKO (née Nagayo) (1900–1966)	INUKAI TAKERU politician and novelist (1896–1960)	OGINO MASAKO (1924–2006)
OGATA TAKETORA; President of LDP (1888–1956)	NAKAMURA TOYOKAZU; Diplomat	NAKAMURA TSUNE (Yoshizawa)	unknown KAWASHIMA OTOKAZU?	IGUCHI MASAKO (Yoshizawa)	IGUCHI SADAO; Ambassador to the US (1899–1980)	INUKAI MICHIKO author and philanthropist (1921–2017)	ANDO KAZU essayist and tarento (1948– )	OKUDA EIJI actor and film director (1950– )	EMOTO AKIRA actor (1948– )	TSUNOGAE KAZUE actress (1981–2018)
OGATA SHIJURO; Director of the Bank of Japan (1927–2014)	OGATA SADAKO; United Nations High Commissioner (1927–2019)	KAWASHIMA YUTAKA; Royal Grand Chamberlain (1942– )	SAZANAMI YOKO; Economist and Professor (1932–2023)	IGUCHI TAKEO; Deputy Director-General of Foreign Affairs (1930– )	IGUCHI SHOKO (née Asao)	ANDO MOMOKO; Film Director and author (1982– )	ANDO SAKURA actress (1986– )	EMOTO TASAKU actor (1986– )	EMOTO TOKIO actor (1989– )
OGATA ATSUSHI; Film director and video artist (1962– )	unknown daughter (2017)

== Bibliography ==
- Bix, Herbert P. Hirohito and the Making of Modern Japan. Harper Perennial (2001). ISBN 0-06-093130-2
- Fogel, Joshua A (1996). The Literature of Travel in the Japanese Rediscovery of China, 1862–1945. Stanford University Press. ISBN 0804725675.
- Large S. S. (2001). Nationalist Extremism in Early Showa Japan: Inoue Nissho and the 'Blood-Pledge Corps Incident', 1932. Modern Asian Studies 35(3): 553–564.
- Lee, To Yee (2011). Sun Yat-Sen, Nanyang and the 1911 Revolution. Institute of Southeast Asian Studies. ISBN 978-9814345460.
- Oka Yoshitake, et al. Five Political Leaders of Modern Japan: Ito Hirobumi, Okuma Shigenobu, Hara Takashi, Inukai Tsuyoshi, and Saionji Kimmochi. University of Tokyo Press (1984). ISBN 0-86008-379-9
- Ozaki, Yukio. (2001). The Autobiography of Ozaki Yukio: The Struggle for Constitutional Government in Japan (translated by Fujiko Hara). Princeton: Princeton University Press. ISBN 978-0-691-05095-9
- Brendon, Piers. The Dark Valley: A Panorama of the 1930s. Vintage; Reprint edition (2002). ISBN 0-375-70808-1
- Toland, John (2003). The Rising Sun: The Decline and Fall of the Japanese Empire, 1936–1945 (reprint ed.). Modern Library. ISBN 0-8129-6858-1.
- Tran, My-Van (2005). A Vietnamese Royal Exile in Japan: Prince Cuong De (1882–1951). Routledge. ISBN 0415297168.

Political offices
Preceded by Wakatsuki Reijirō	Prime Minister of Japan; 13 December 1931 – 16 May 1932	Succeeded by Takahashi Korekiyo (acting)
Preceded by Shidehara Kijūrō	Minister of Foreign Affairs (Interim); 13 Dec 1931 – 14 Jan 1932	Succeeded by Yoshizawa Kenkichi
Preceded by Nakahashi Tokugorō	Home Minister (Interim); 16 March 1932 – 25 March 1932	Succeeded by Suzuki Kisaburō (acting)
Preceded by Maeda Toshisada	Minister of Communications; 2 September 1923 – 7 January 1924	Succeeded by Fujimura Yoshirō
Preceded by Fujimura Yoshirō	Minister of Communications; 11 June 1924 – 30 May 1925	Succeeded by Adachi Kenzō
Preceded by Ozaki Yukio	Minister of Education; 27 October 1898 – 8 November 1898	Succeeded by Kabayama Sukenori
Preceded by Kamata Eikichi	Minister of Education; 2 September 1923 – 6 September 1923	Succeeded by Okano Keijirō
House of Representatives (Japan)
New district	Representative for Okayama 2nd district 1928−1932; Served alongside: Ogawa Gōtarō, Nishimura Tanjirō, Hoshijima Nirō, several others	Vacant Title next held by Inukai Takeru etc.
New district	Representative for Okayama 4th district (single-member); 1920−1928	district eliminated
New district	Representative for Okayama counties district 1902−1920; Served alongside: Nishimura Tanjirō, Moriya Konosuke, many others	district eliminated
New parliament	Representative for Okayama 3rd district (single-member); 1890−1902	district eliminated
Party political offices
Preceded by Tanaka Giichi	Rikken Seiyūkai president 1929−1932	Succeeded by Suzuki Kisaburō
