= Zembei Horikiri =

- 堀切 善兵衛
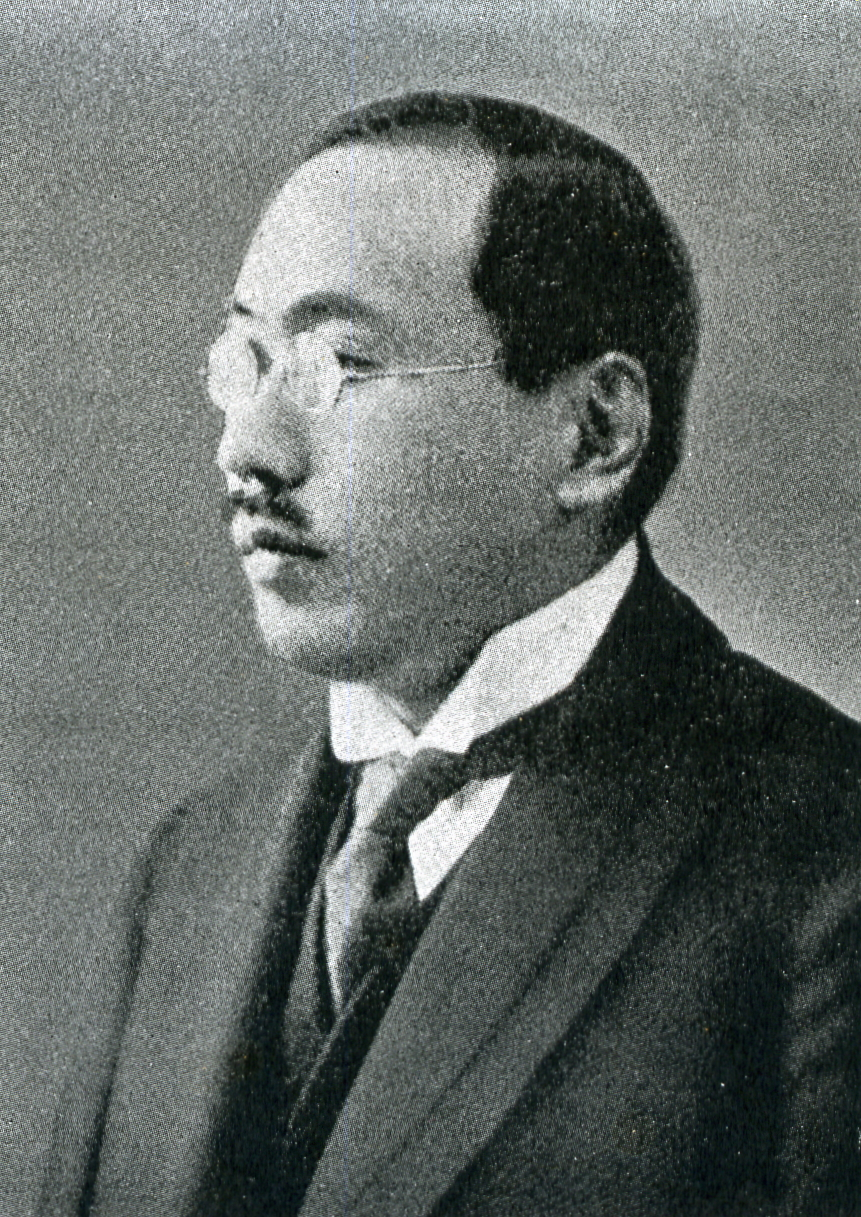
- Horikiri in 1932

Speaker of the House of Representatives
- In office 23 December 1929 – 21 January 1930
- Monarch: Hirohito
- Deputy: Ichirō Kiyose
- Preceded by: Kawahara Mosuke
- Succeeded by: Fujisawa Ikunosuke

Member of the House of Peers
- In office 24 February 1945 – 15 June 1946 Nominated by the Emperor

Member of the House of Representatives; from Fukushima
- In office 10 March 1938 – 26 September 1940
- Preceded by: Kan'no Zen'emon
- Succeeded by: Sōhei Katō
- Constituency: 1st district
- In office 15 May 1912 – 31 March 1937
- Preceded by: Multi-member district
- Succeeded by: Kugimoto Morio
- Constituency: Counties district (1912–1920); 3rd district (1920–1928); 1st district (1928–1937)

Personal details
- Born: 4 May 1882 Kami-Iizaka, Fukushima, Japan
- Died: 25 November 1946 (aged 64) Iizaka, Fukushima, Japan
- Party: Rikken Seiyukai
- Spouse: Misuzu Horikiri
- Children: Ryoko Jūmonji
- Relatives: Zenjiro Horikiri (brother); Hisagoro Uchiike (brother); Shutaro Yoshino (father-in-law)
- Education: Keio University

Zembei Horikiri (堀切 善兵衛; 4 May 1882 – 25 November 1946) was a Japanese politician and economist who served as Speaker of the House of Representatives from 1929 to 1930 and Ambassador to Italy from 1940 to 1942. He belonged to the Rikken Seiyukai party, and held several ranks in the Japanese imperial court. While ambassador, he worked to foster cooperation among the Tripartite Pact powers alongside Hiroshi Oshima, Japan's Ambassador to Germany. His brother, Zenjirō Horikiri, served as Minister for Home Affairs under Prime Minister Kijūrō Shidehara. In 1946, Horikiri died at home in Iizaka aged 64.

== Early life and education ==
Born as the eldest son of Ryohei Horikiri in Kami-Iizaka, Fukushima Prefecture (now Fukushima City), he graduated in 1903 from the Faculty of Commerce, Keio University. He studied abroad at Harvard University, Oxford University, and Humboldt University of Berlin in Germany, then returned to teach at Keio University. He was an economist, specializing in economic theory, public finance, commercial policy, and colonial policy. His younger brothers were Zenjiro Horikiri, who held posts including Minister of Home Affairs, and Hisagoro Uchiike, also a member of the House of Representatives.

== Political career ==
He was elected consecutively 10 times from the 11th general election in 1912 to the 20th general election in 1937. In 1912, in his campaign for the 11th general election, he ran as a Rikken Seiyukai candidate from Fukushima Prefecture 1st District and was elected. He served as party secretary and general secretary. In 1918, he became secretary to Finance Minister Korekiyo Takahashi. In 1921, he concurrently served as Counselor at the Ministry of Finance and secretary to Prime Minister Takahashi. In 1924, he was appointed Commerce and Agriculture Ministry Counselor in the Kato Cabinet. In 1925, he became Commerce Ministry Counselor under Kato Cabinet.

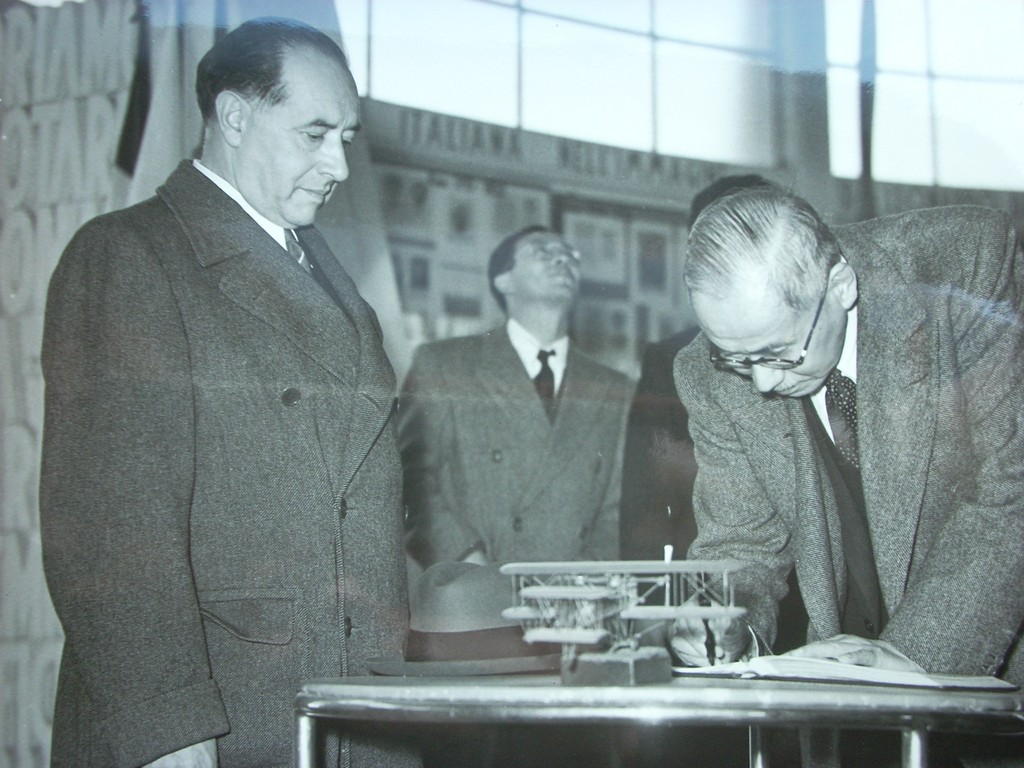
Horikiri in Milan, Italy with aircraft designer Gianni Caproni, April 1942

In March 1927, he was investigated and charged with assault related to a parliamentary brawl. On 16 December 1927, he was fined 50 yen.

In 1929, he was elected the 27th Speaker of the House of Representatives. In 1931, he was appointed Parliamentary Vice-Minister of Finance under the Inukai Cabinet. In 1939, he joined the Reform Alliance faction of the Seiyukai party. In 1940, at the request of Foreign Minister Yosuke Matsuoka, he became Ambassador to Italy. On 11 December 1941, he stood alongside Benito Mussolini on the balcony of the Piazza Venezia in Rome as Italy's declaration of war on the United States was announced.

He worked to bolster Tripartite Pact cooperation along with Ambassador Hiroshi Oshima. In 1941, he received the Order of the Sacred Treasure, 1st class. In 1942, he resigned as Ambassador and served as Special Envoy in Europe for two years. He returned to Japan in 1944. On 24 February 1945, he was appointed Imperial Appointed Member of the House of Peers. In 1946, he was purged from public office, resigned from the House of Peers on 15 June 1946, and died of a peptic ulcer at home in Iizaka on 25 November 1946, aged 64.

== Honors ==
Japanese court ranks

- 30 October 1918 - Junior Fifth Rank
- 10 December 1921 - Senior Fifth Rank
- 16 April 1934 - Junior Fourth Rank
- 15 July 1942 - Senior Fourth Rank
- 30 November 1944 - Junior Third Rank

Orders and decorations

Year of Award	Ribbon	Order / Medal
10 November 1915		Taishō Enthronement Commemorative Medal
1 April 1916		Order of the Sacred Treasure, 4th Class
1 November 1920		Order of the Rising Sun, Small Badge
1 July 1921		First National Census Commemorative Medal
25 December 1923		Order of the Sacred Treasure, 3rd Class
10 November 1928		One Gold Cup
12 February 1930		Order of the Sacred Treasure, 2nd Class
1 May 1931		Capital Reconstruction Commemorative Medal
29 April 1934		Order of the Rising Sun, Second Class
10 November 1940		2600th Anniversary of the Imperial Era Commemorative Medal
9 August 1941		Order of the Sacred Treasure, 1st Class

Foreign decorations

Date	Country	Ribbon	Order
1 March 1934	Manchukuo		Imperial Visit to Japan Commemorative Medal
21 September 1935	Manchukuo		Emperor's Visit Commemorative Medal
7 June 1941	Kingdom of Italy		Order of Saints Maurice and Lazarus, Grand Cross

== Family ==
- Wife: Misuzu Horikiri (daughter of Shutaro Yoshino)
- Eldest daughter: Ryoko Jūmonji (wife of Toshio Jūmonji)
- Brothers: Zenjiro Horikiri (Home Ministry official), Hisagoro Uchiike (House of Representatives member)

== See also ==
- House of Representatives (Japan)

== Bibliography ==
- Keio University ed., 'Keio University General Register Taisho 3', Keio University, 1914

Assembly seats
Preceded by Shigesuke Kawahara	Speaker of the House of Representatives (Japan); 23 December 1929 – 21 January 1930	Succeeded by Fujisawa Ikunosuke
