= Kenkichi Yoshizawa =

Japanese diplomat

Junior Second Rank Kenkichi Yoshizawa
- 芳澤 謙吉
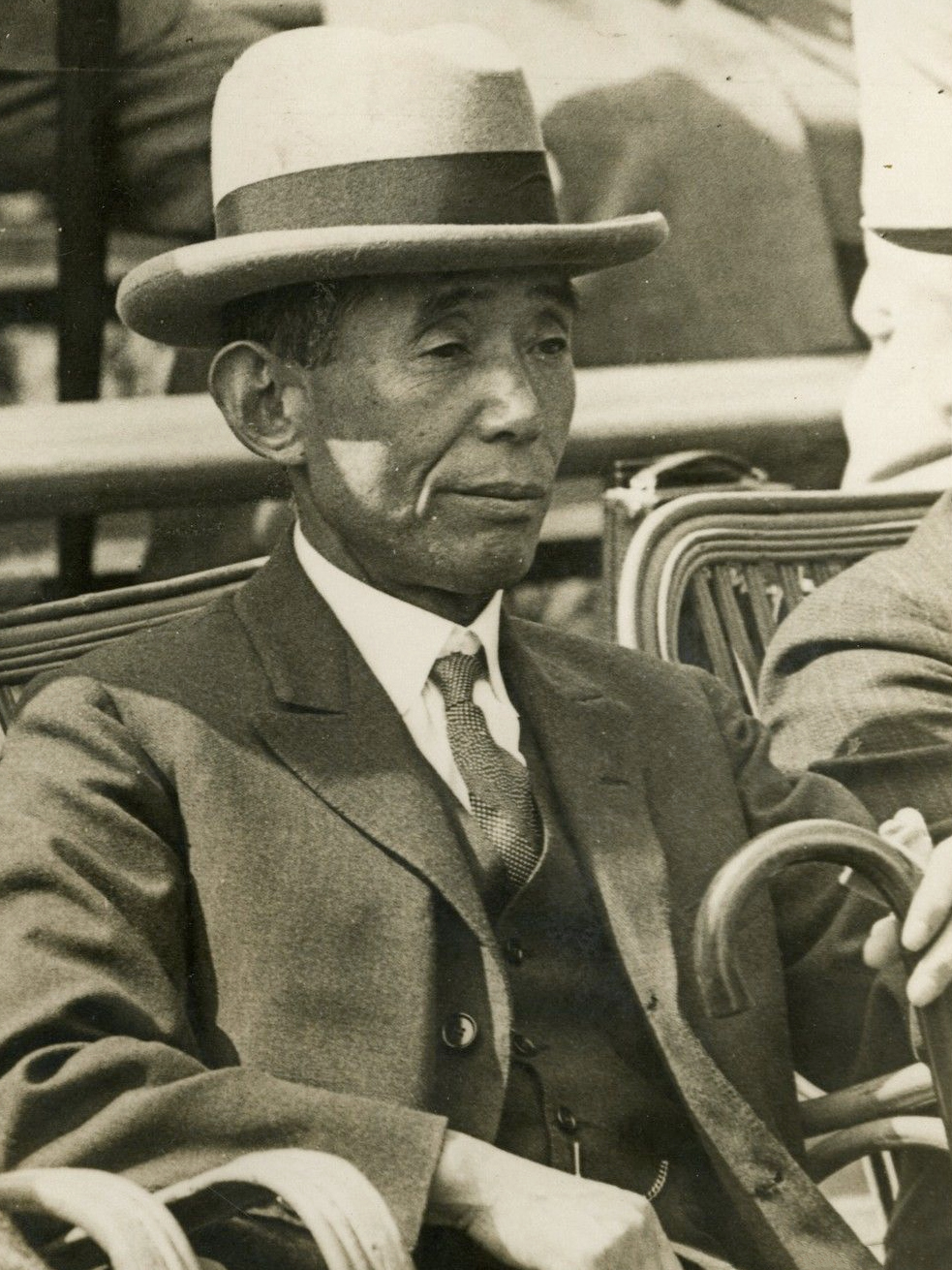
- Yoshizawa c. 1931

Minister for Foreign Affairs
- In office 14 January 1932 – 26 May 1932
- Prime Minister: Inukai Tsuyoshi
- Preceded by: Inukai Tsuyoshi
- Succeeded by: Saitō Makoto

Member of the Privy Council
- In office 7 August 1945 – 17 April 1946
- Monarch: Hirohito

Member of the House of Peers
- In office 1 July 1932 – 19 August 1945 Nominated by the Emperor

Personal details
- Born: 24 January 1874 Jōetsu, Niigata, Japan
- Died: 5 January 1965 (aged 90) Tokyo, Japan
- Party: Rikken Seiyūkai
- Spouse: Misao Inukai (m. 1905)
- Relatives: Inukai Tsuyoshi (father-in-law); Takeru Inukai (brother-in-law)
- Education: Tokyo Imperial University

Kenkichi Yoshizawa (芳澤 謙吉, Yoshizawa Kenkichi; 24 January 1874 – 5 January 1965) was a Japanese diplomat in the Empire of Japan, serving as 46th Foreign Minister of Japan in 1932. He was the father-in-law of Sadao Iguchi, a diplomat who served as Ambassador to the United States, and maternal grandfather of Sadako Ogata, the former United Nations High Commissioner for Refugees, and maternal grandfather of Yutaka Kawashima, a former Grand Chamberlain of Japan.

== Early life ==
Yoshizawa was a native of what is now part of Jōetsu City, Niigata Prefecture. He was a graduate of the English literature department of the Tokyo Imperial University and entered the Ministry of Foreign Affairs in 1899.

In 1905, Yoshizawa married Misao Inukai, the eldest daughter of politician (and future Prime Minister) Tsuyoshi Inukai, and moved to London. He continued to live in England for the next several years, eventually becoming First Secretary to the Japanese embassy. He was given the post of Consul-General in Hankou, China in 1912.

== Diplomatic career ==
Yoshizawa was assigned to the Japanese consulate in Amoy, China in 1902, and later to the consulate in Shanghai.

He served as Minister to China from 1923–1929, and was stationed at the Japanese consulates at Beijing and Tianjin. He met with Soviet Foreign Minister Lev Karakhan in Beijing in 1925 for talks which led to the formal establishment of diplomatic relations between Japan and the Soviet Union per the Soviet–Japanese Basic Convention.

Yoshizawa later served as Japanese ambassador to France and official representative to the League of Nations.

He was appointed to the cabinet of his father-in-law, Prime Minister Inukai Tsuyoshi, as Foreign Minister from 14 January 1932 to 26 May 1932. On receiving word of his appointment, Yoshizawa traveled from Europe back to Japan via the Trans-Siberian Railway and Manchuria to see conditions first-hand. Following the assassination of Inukai in the May 15 Incident, the Inukai cabinet was dissolved. However, Yoshizawa received an appointment to the House of Peers (present day House of Councillors) by command of Emperor Shōwa, and joined the Rikken Seiyūkai political party.

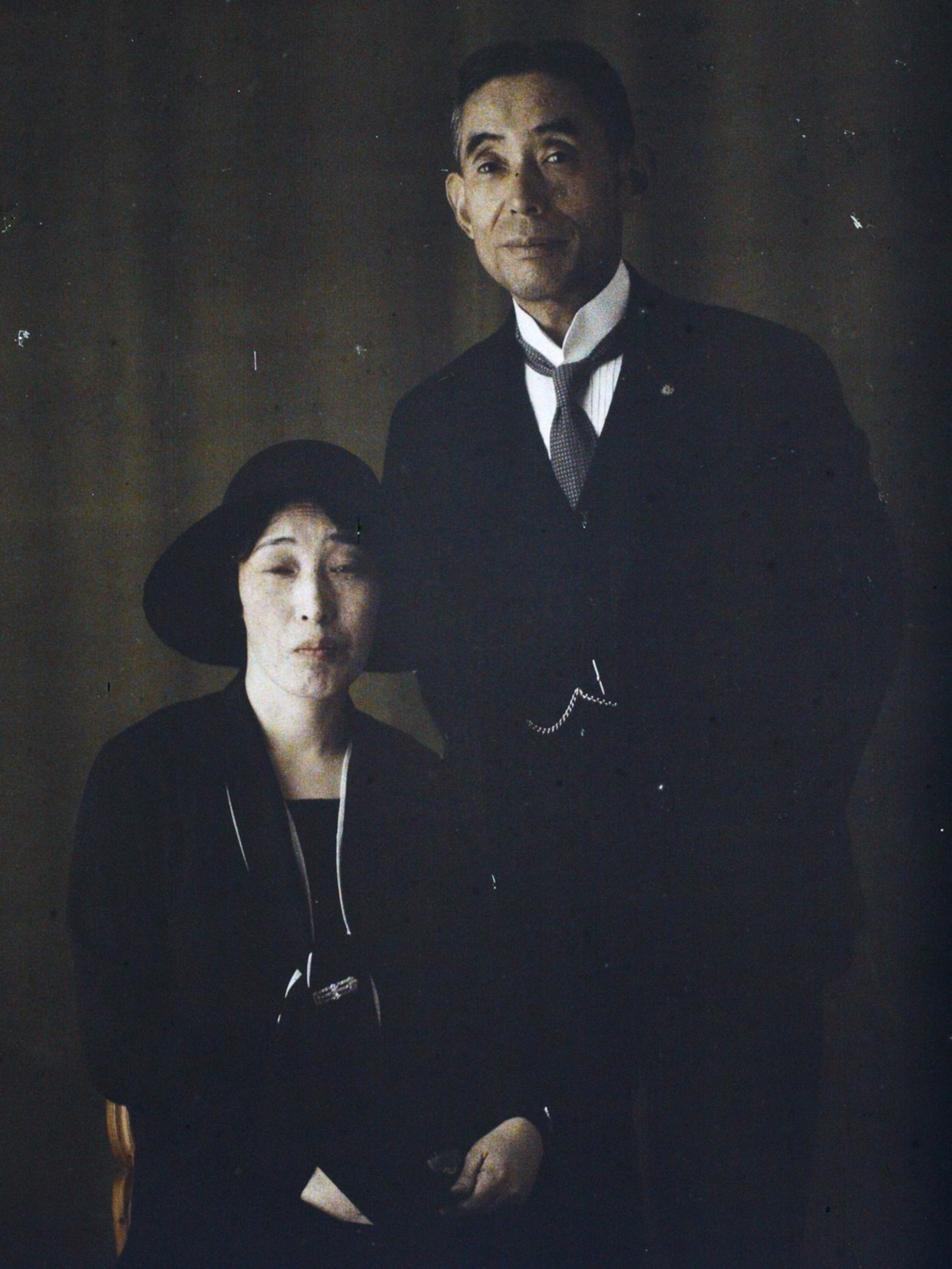
Yoshizawa with his wife Misao, 1930 Autochrome by Georges Chevalier

In the period immediately prior to the start of the Pacific War, Yoshizawa was appointed as a special envoy by Prime Minister Fumimaro Konoe to the Netherlands East Indies following the diplomatic mission of Ichizo Kobayashi. Yoshizawa was assigned to present a new set of demands to the Dutch government in Batavia, which were deliberately intended to be unacceptable.

- Adherence to Japan's vision and policy in South East Asia,
- Unrestricted rights to explore and exploit minerals all over the Dutch East Indies
- Unrestricted fishing and shipping rights in all the waters of the Dutch East Indies
- Unrestricted rights to start all sorts of commercial enterprises
- Japan's export to the Dutch East Indies must be increased to more than 80% of all imports of the Dutch East Indies
- The existing demand for oil was slightly increased to 3,800,000 tons
- The Dutch East Indies was to supply Japan with 1,000,000 tons of tin, 400,000 tons of bauxite, 180,000 tons of nickel, 30,000 tons of rubber, 30,000 tons of coconut oil and 10,000 tons of sugar.
- Airline and telegraph connections between Japan and the Dutch East Indies

In December 1940, Yoshizawa was met by Hubertus Johannes van Mook, deputy minister of Economic Affairs, K. L. J. Enthoven, director of Justice, and Hoessein Djajadiningrat, director of Education and Religion. The negotiations dragged on unsuccessfully, and on 11 June 1941, the Liaison Meeting of the Imperial General Headquarters and Government decided to recall Yoshizawa and terminate the talks. Yoshizawa suddenly announced to the Dutch his plan to depart and asked to be received by the Dutch Governor-General A. W. L. Tjarda van Starkenborgh Stachouwer on 17 June 1941. The latter was worried that he might receive a declaration of war, but to his relief Yoshizawa only handed him a draft declaration stating that the negotiations had ended without an agreement.

From 1941–1944, Yoshizawa served as Japanese ambassador to French Indochina. The posting was mostly symbolic, as by then Indochina was mostly under Japanese military occupation. In August 1945, he became a member of the Privy Council.

After the end of World War II, the surrender of Japan, Yoshizawa was purged from public office by the American occupation authorities. In post-war Japan, he was appointed as Japanese ambassador to the Republic of China on Taiwan in 1952. He retired from public life in December 1956.

== Family tree ==
Yoshizawa family tree

Yoshizawa Joryo mayor of Suwa Village	Tsuyoshi Inukai; 29th Prime Minister of Japan (1855–1932)	Chiyoko Inukai (Mita) (1865-1952)
Otowa Watanabe	Kenkichi Yoshizawa; 46th Foreign Minister of Japan (1874–1965)	Misao Yoshizawa (Inukai)	Takeru Inukai politician and novelist (1896–1960)	Nakako Inukai (Nagayosho) (1900–1966)
Taketora Ogata; President of LDP (1888–1956)	Toyoichi Nakamura diplomat (1895–1971)	Tsuneko	unknown, maybe Otokazu	Masako	Sadao Iguchi; Ambassador to the US (1899–1980)	Michiko Inukai author and philanthropist (1921–2017)
Shijuro Ogata; Director of the Bank of Japan (1927–2014)	Sadako Ogata; United Nations High Commissioner (1927–2019)	Yutaka Kawashima; Royal Grand Chamberlain (1942- )	Yoko Sazanami; Economist and Professor (1932–2023)	Takeo Iguchi; Deputy Director-General of Foreign Affairs (1930- )	Shoko Iguchi (Asao)
Atsushi Ogata; Film director and video artist (1962- )
