= 0.5 mm =

- Theatrical release poster
- 0.5ミリ
- Directed by: Momoko Andō
- Screenplay by: Momoko Andō
- Based on: 0.5 mm by Momoko Andō
- Produced by: Yoshiya Nagasawa; Suzuko Hatanaka
- Starring: Sakura Ando; Akira Emoto; Masahiko Tsugawa; Mitsuko Kusabue; Toshio Sakata
- Cinematography: Takahiro Haibara
- Edited by: Junichi Masunaga
- Music by: TaQ
- Release date: November 8, 2014 (Japan)
- Running time: 198 minutes
- Country: Japan
- Language: Japanese

0.5 mm (Japanese: 0.5ミリ) is a 2014 Japanese drama film written and directed by Japanese novelist and filmmaker Momoko Andō. It was released in Japan on November 8, 2014.

== Synopsis ==
Sawa Yamagishi was employed as a nursing care assistant. Sawa finally lost her residence and career when the family of an elderly man urged her to sleep with him. She's got nowhere to go now. Sawa intervenes in the lives of elderly persons who are having problems. After meeting them, Sawa's personal scars begin to heal and their lives change.

== Cast ==
- Akira Emoto as Takeshi Sasaki
- Kazue Tsunogae as Hamada
- Tatsuo Inoue as Yasuo
- Junkichi Orimoto as Shozo Kataoka
- Masahiko Tsugawa as Yoshio Makabe
- Masahiro Higashide as Karaoke clerk
- Midori Kiuchi as Yukiko Kataoka
- Mitsuko Kusabue as Shizue Makabe
- Miyoko Asada as Hisako
- Nozomi Tsuchiya as Makoto Kataoka
- Sakura Ando as Sawa Yamagishi
- Toshio Sakata as Shigeru

== Reception ==
=== Critical response ===
Maggie Lee of Variety called the film "a work of both cool precision and endearing eccentricity".

== Accolades ==
At the 36th Yokohama Film Festival, the film was chosen as the 3rd best Japanese film of the year and Momoko Andō won the award for Best Director. At the 39th Hochi Film Awards, the film won the award for Best Picture and Masahiko Tsugawa won the award for Best Supporting Actor. At the 69th Mainichi Film Awards, Momoko Andō won the award for Best Screenplay and Sakura Ando won the award for Best Actress.
