= Yoshirō Fujimura =

Japanese politician

- 藤村 義朗
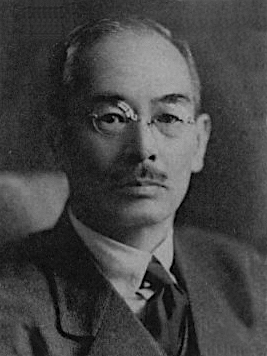
- Fujimura Yoshirō

Minister of Communications
- In office 7 January 1924 – 11 June 1924
- Prime Minister: Kiyoura Keigo
- Preceded by: Inukai Tsuyoshi
- Succeeded by: Inukai Tsuyoshi

Member of the House of Peers
- In office 10 July 1918 – 27 November 1933 Elected by the Barons

Personal details
- Born: 21 January 1871 Kumamoto Prefecture, Japan
- Died: 27 November 1933 (aged 62)
- Party: Kōseikai
- Education: University of Cambridge

Baron Yoshirō Fujimura (藤村 義朗, Fujimura Yoshirō; 21 January 1871 – 27 November 1933) was an entrepreneur, politician and cabinet minister in the pre-war Empire of Japan. He was a director of the Mitsui zaibatsu during the 1920s.

== Biography ==
Fujimura was born in Kumamoto Prefecture as the eldest son of Baron Fujimura Shirō. In April 1885 he was sent to England to study at Cambridge University (St John's College), returning to Japan in February 1892. In April 1894, he accepted a post at Mitsui Mining and rose rapidly through the ranks. He transferred to Mitsui & Co. in January 1898. He again rose rapidly through the ranks, including postings as branch manager in London and in Shanghai, becoming a director in January 1918.

Fujimura also became a baron on the death of his father in February 1909, and was appointed to a seat in the House of Peers in July 1918. He continued to serve in the House of Peers until his death in 1933.

As a member of the House of Peers, Fujimura pressed strongly for a reform in its composition, proposing that its membership be composed of equal numbers of hereditary peers and appointed commoners, as well as increasing the number of seats for the former Korean aristocracy. He also pushed for abolishment of government stipends for the members of the house, and election of the higher ranks of peers rather than universal appointment. Fujimura published his proposals in 1921, but the proposals were not adopted. He was also outspoken against the involvement of women in politics, stating that: “women’s natural place is in the home” in a speech in the Diet of Japan in 1921.

In January 1924, Fujimura was appointed Minister of Communications under the Kiyoura administration, an office he hold from January to June 1924 Fujimura also held a number of other mostly honorary positions, including senior managing director of the Shanghai Textile Co., Ltd, president of the Taishō Nichi-nichi Shimbun newspaper, chairman of the Sericulture Union Federation, and chairman of the National Parks Board.

Political offices
Preceded by Inukai Tsuyoshi	Minister of Communications; January–June 1924	Succeeded by Inukai Tsuyoshi
