= Fujisawa Ikunosuke =

Japanese politician

Junior Second Rank Fujisawa Ikunosuke
- 藤沢 幾之輔
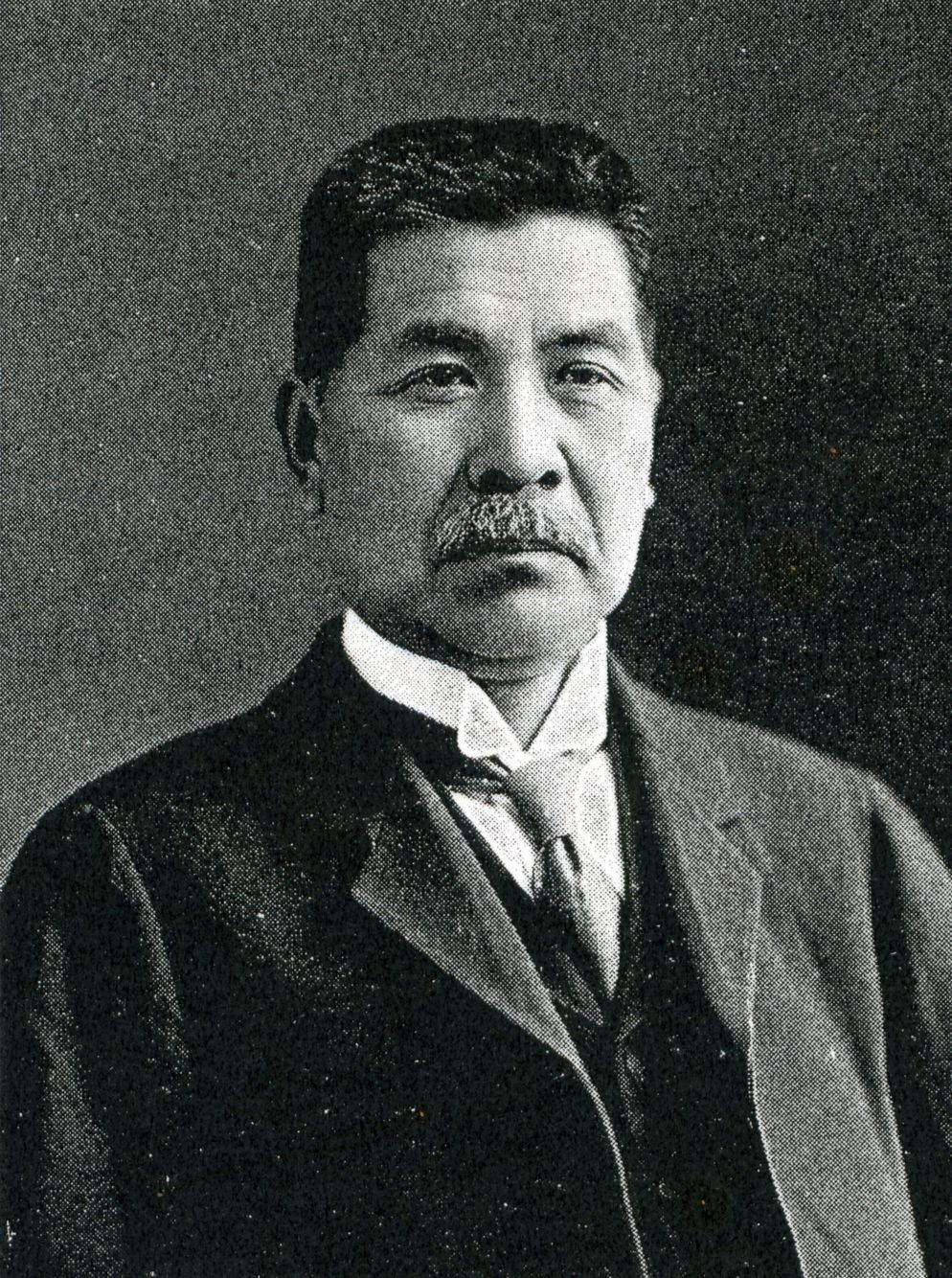
- Fujisawa in 1929

Speaker of the House of Representatives
- In office 21 April 1930 – 13 April 1931
- Monarch: Hirohito
- Deputy: Shōju Koyama
- Preceded by: Horikiri Zenbee
- Succeeded by: Nakamura Keijirō

Minister of Commerce and Industry
- In office 14 September 1926 – 20 April 1927
- Prime Minister: Wakatsuki Reijirō
- Preceded by: Kataoka Naoharu
- Succeeded by: Nakahashi Tokugorō

Member of the Privy Council
- In office 15 June 1934 – 3 April 1940
- Monarch: Hirohito

Member of the House of Peers
- In office 13 April 1931 – 20 June 1934 Nominated by the Emperor

Member of the House of Representatives
- In office 10 May 1924 – 13 April 1931
- Preceded by: Nozoe Juichi
- Succeeded by: Miyazawa Seisaku
- Constituency: Miyagi 3rd (1924–1928); Miyagi 1st (1928–1931)
- In office 15 March 1898 – 26 February 1920
- Preceded by: Kusakari Shinmei
- Succeeded by: Constituency abolished
- Constituency: Miyagi 1st (1898–1902); Sendai City (1902–1912); Miyagi Counties (1912–1920)
- In office 15 February 1892 – 30 December 1893
- Preceded by: Jūmonji Shinsuke
- Succeeded by: Toshiyasu Gotō
- Constituency: Miyagi 3rd

Personal details
- Born: 13 October 1859 Sendai, Mutsu, Japan
- Died: 3 April 1940 (aged 81) Tokyo, Japan
- Party: Rikken Minseitō (1927–1940)
- Other political affiliations: Rikken Kaishintō (1892–1896); Shimpotō (1896–1898); Kensei Hontō (1898–1910); Rikken Kokumintō (1910–1913); Rikken Dōshikai (1913–1916); Kenseikai (1916–1927)

Fujisawa Ikunosuke (藤沢 幾之輔; 20 March 1859 – 3 April 1940) was a lawyer, politician, and cabinet minister in the Empire of Japan, serving as a member of both the Lower House and Upper House of the Diet of Japan.

== Biography ==
Fujisawa was a native of Sendai in Mutsu Province (present-day Miyagi Prefecture). Following the Meiji restoration, he studied the English language and passed his bar examinations in 1879. He distinguished himself with his role in the Fukushima incident of 1882. He began his political career in 1889 as an assemblyman in the Sendai City Assembly. He subsequently rose to the position of Chairman of the Sendai City Assembly, member of the Miyagi Prefectural Assembly and Chairman of the Miyagi Prefectural Assembly.

Fujisawa entered national politics as a member of the Lower House of the Diet of Japan in the 1892 General Election, and was subsequently re-elected thirteen times. In his early career, he was a member of the Rikken Kaishintō, but later served as an officer in the Rikken Dōshikai, Kenseikai and Rikken Minseitō. Fujisawa joined the cabinet under the brief 1st Wakatsuki Reijirō administration in 1927 as Minister of Commerce and Industry. In 1930, he became Speaker of the House of the Lower House of the Diet of Japan. In 1931, Fujisawa was awarded a seat in the House of Peers. In 1934, Fujisawa was appointed to the Privy Council.

He died on 3 April 1940 of pneumonia in Tokyo.

Political offices
Preceded by Kataoka Naoharu	Minister of Commerce and Industry; 14 September 1926 – 20 April 1927	Succeeded by Nakahashi Tokugorō
House of Representatives (Japan)
Preceded by Horikiri Zenbe	Speaker of the House of Representatives; 21 April 1930 – 13 April 1931	Succeeded by Nakamura Keijirō
