= Nakahashi Tokugorō =

Japanese businessman and politician

Senior Third Rank Nakahashi Tokugorō
- 中橋 徳五郎
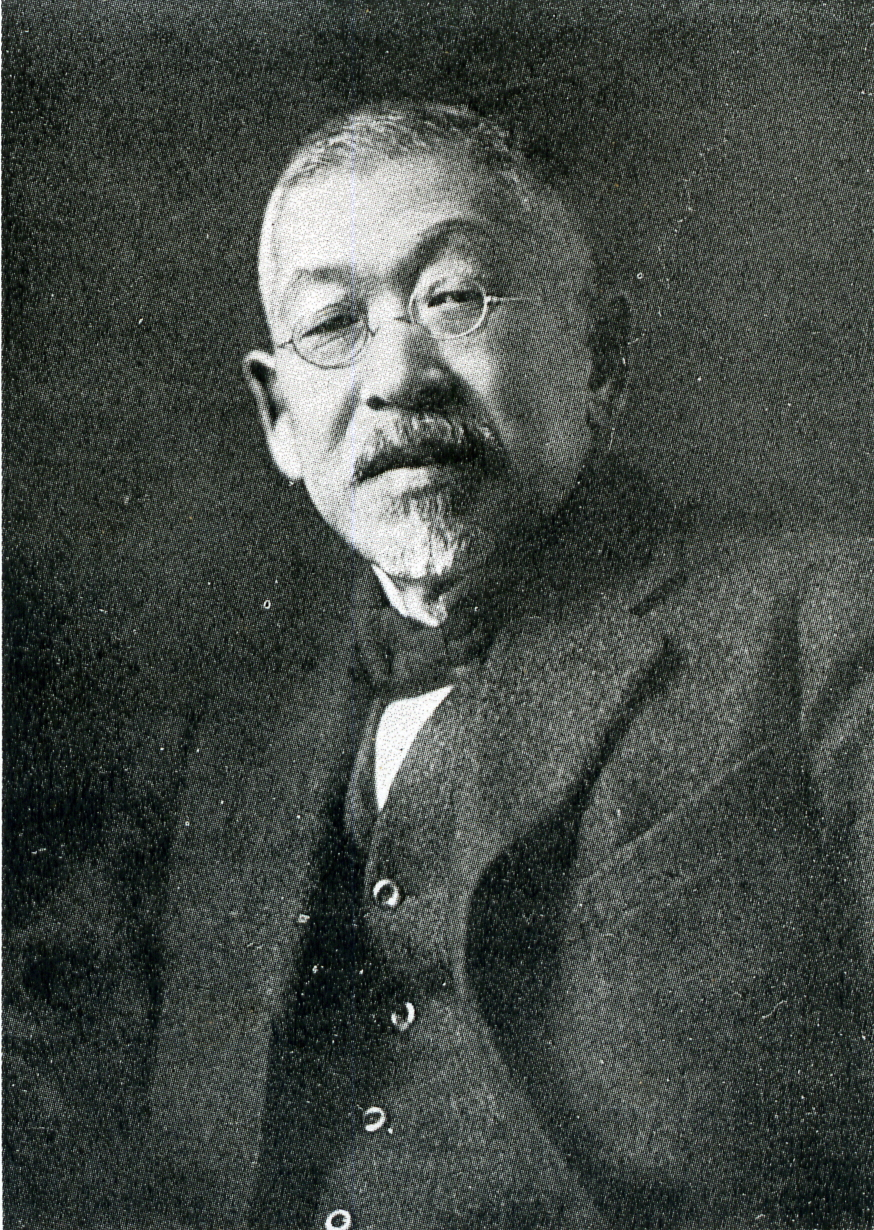

Minister of Home Affairs
- In office 13 December 1931 – 16 March 1932
- Prime Minister: Inukai Tsuyoshi
- Preceded by: Adachi Kenzō
- Succeeded by: Inukai Tsuyoshi

Minister of Commerce and Industry
- In office 20 April 1927 – 3 July 1929
- Prime Minister: Tanaka Giichi
- Preceded by: Fujisawa Ikunosuke
- Succeeded by: Tawara Magoichi

Minister of Education
- In office 29 September 1918 – 12 June 1922
- Prime Minister: Hara Takashi; Takahashi Korekiyo
- Preceded by: Okada Yohei
- Succeeded by: Kamata Eikichi

Member of the House of Representatives
- In office 20 February 1928 – 25 March 1934
- Preceded by: Constituency established
- Succeeded by: Jinbo Jūkichi
- Constituency: Ishikawa 1st
- In office 19 December 1916 – 31 January 1924
- Preceded by: Akira Yokoyama
- Succeeded by: Wataru Yoshizu
- Constituency: Kanazawa City (1916–1920); Osaka 3rd (1920–1924)
- In office 15 May 1912 – 2 December 1912
- Preceded by: Multi-member district
- Succeeded by: Tamenosuke Ishibashi
- Constituency: Osaka City

Member of the Osaka City Council
- In office 1901–1912

Personal details
- Born: 13 October 1861 Kanazawa, Kaga, Japan
- Died: 24 March 1934 (aged 72) Kōjimachi, Tokyo, Japan
- Resting place: Gokoku-ji, Tokyo
- Party: Rikken Seiyūkai (1914–1924; 1925–1934)
- Other political affiliations: Seiyūhontō (1924–1925)
- Education: Tokyo Imperial University

Nakahashi Tokugorō (中橋 徳五郎; 13 October 1861 – 25 March 1934) was a Japanese businessman and politician active during the Taishō and early Shōwa periods. After serving as president of Osaka Shōsen Shipping Company (OSK Lines), he entered politics and later served as a cabinet minister.

== Early life ==
Nakahashi was the son of a samurai in the service of the Maeda clan of Kaga Domain. After the Meiji Restoration, he studied at the law school of Tokyo Imperial University, specializing in his post-graduate curriculum in commercial law, and in 1886, soon after graduation, worked in Yokohama as a trial lawyer and judge in commercial cases. However, in 1887, he was scouted as a councilor for the Ministry of Agriculture and Commerce, and then asked to serve as a legal councilor for the House of Representatives of Japan in 1889. In this capacity, he travelled to the United States and Korea, serving subsequently in the secretariat of the House of Representatives, councilor to the Ministry of Communications, Director of the Audit Board of the Ministry of Communications, and Director of the Railway Bureau.

In 1898, Nakahashi was asked by his father-in-law, Takana Ichibe, to assume the post of president of Osaka Shōsen Shipping Company. He was active in expanding the firms operations in Taiwan, which had just become part of the Japanese Empire following the First Sino-Japanese War. He also served on the board of directors of Chisso, one of the minor zaibatsu, and it was during his tenure that Chisso began construction of a plant in Minamata, Kumamoto.

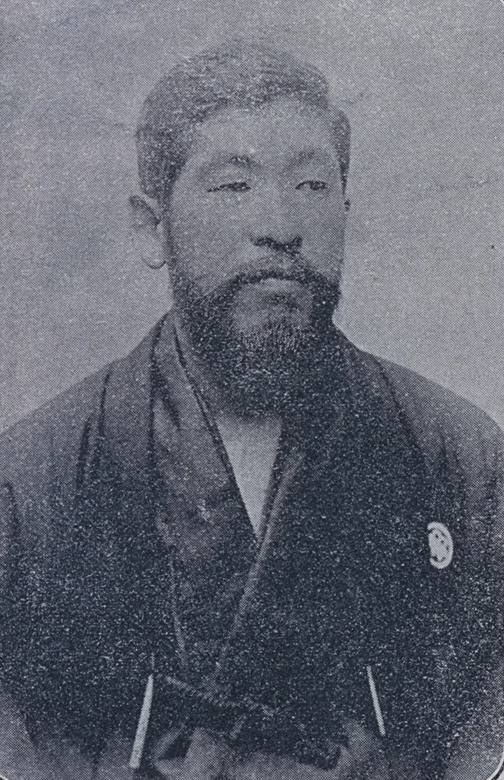
Nakahashi in 1897.

== Political career ==
Nakahashi's political career began in 1901, when he was elected to the Osaka City Assembly, and served as its chairman. In the 1912 Japanese general election, Nakahashi was elected to the House of Representatives from the Osaka general constituency and was re-elected five consecutive times. He joined the Rikken Seiyūkai in 1914. In 1918, he changed his constituency to the Kanazawa prefectural general constituency.

Nakahashi was appointed to the Hara Cabinet as Minister of Education, Science, Sports and Culture in 1918. While Education Minister, Nakahashi sought to expand the higher education system in Japan, including the creation of five more medical schools, 29 schools of pharmacy, and creating additional imperial universities. Following Hara's assassination in 1921, Nakahashi continued as Education Minister in the Takahashi Cabinet. In 1924, together with Tokonami Takejirō, he joined the new Seiyūhontō, helping bring down the Takahashi administration, but returned to the Rikken Seiyukai in 1925.

In 1927, under the Tanaka Giichi Cabinet, Nakahashi served as Minister of Commerce and Industry. On 23 May 1927, he established a Commerce and Industry Deliberation Council to examine issues with the Japanese economy, and to determine steps to take to improve the situation, compile economic statistics and to encourage economic rationalization through the mergers of companies.

In 1931, Nakahashi returned to the cabinet once more, as Home Minister under the Inukai Cabinet. However, he was forced to resign his position in 1932 due to illness. He died in 1934 at the age of 74. His grave is at the temple of Gokoku-ji in Tokyo.

== Notes ==
Political offices
Preceded by Fujisawa Ikunosuke	Minister of Commerce and Industry; 20 April 1927 – 3 July 1929	Succeeded by Tawara Magoichi
Preceded by Adachi Kenzō	Minister of Home Affairs; 13 December 1931 – 16 March 1932	Succeeded by Inukai Tsuyoshi
Preceded by Okada Yohei	Minister of Education, Science, Sports and Culture; 29 September 1918 – 12 June 1922	Succeeded by Kamata Eikichi
