= Kazu Ando =

Japanese writer

- 安藤 和津
- Born: Kazuko Ogino and Inukai; 6 March 1948 (age 78); Yanagibashi, Tokyo, Japan
- Other name: Kazuko Ando (real name)
- Education: Gakushūin Girls High School; Sophia University
- Occupations: Essayist, tarento
- Agent: Production Pao
- Spouse: Eiji Okuda (m. 1974)
- Children: Momoko Ando; Sakura Ando
- Parents: Inukai Takeru (father); Masako Ogino (mother)
- Relatives: Inukai Tsuyoshi (grandfather); Michiko Inukai (half-sister); Tasuku Emoto (son-in-law); Sadako Ogata (cousin)

Kazuko Ando (安藤 和子, Andō Kazuko; née Ogino (荻野) and Inukai (犬養), born 6 March 1948, in Tokyo, Japan), better known as Kazu Ando (安藤 和津, Andō Kazu), is a Japanese essayist and tarento represented by Production Pao.

== Bibliography ==
| Year | Title | Notes |
|---|---|---|
| 1988 | Onnazakari wa Kosodate-mori: Momoko & Sakura | |
| 1988 | Tsuki Usagi | |
| 1989 | Aiueo: Kadu Andou no Shufu to Seikatsu | |
| 1992 | Aisuru Koto Aisa Reru Koto | |
| 1994 | Tekipaki Kaji Ehon | |
| 1995 | Isogashi Mama no Aijō Recipe 121 | |
| 2000 | Aisuru Koto Aisa Reru Koto | |
| 2002 | Sakura Usagi | |
| 2004 | Omutsu o Haita Mama: Haha to no Ai to Kakutō no Hibi | |
| 2006 | Nagai Sanpo | Adapted to film A Long Walk |

=== Translations ===
| Year | Title | Notes |
|---|---|---|
| 1994 | Peter Pan Partner: "Haha hanare dekinai otoko" to, dō Tsukiau ka | |

== Filmography ==
=== TV series ===
| Year | Title | Network | Notes |
|---|---|---|---|
| 2002 | Mairitoru Chef | TBS | Final episode |
| 2005 | Just | TBS | |
| | Gatten | NHK G TV | |
| | Minna no Katei no Igaku | ABC | |
| | Kaiketsu Jukujo! Shinpaigomuyō | TBS | |
| | Hei! Say! A Board of Education | Fuji TV | |
| | Akihiro Yoshimura no Quiz Lunch | TBS | Regular appearances |

=== Radio series ===
| Year | Title | Network | Notes |
|---|---|---|---|
| 2005 | Kadu Andou no TEPCO Talk Marche | NCB | |
| | Doyō Wide Radio Tokyo | TBS Radio | Relay caster debut |
