= List of ambassadors of Japan to Italy =

The List of Japanese ambassadors to Italy started when Kawase Masataka presented his credentials to the Italian government in 1876.

== List ==
This is a chronological list of Japanese diplomats.

Inaugural date	Official position (Japanese)	Official position	Name (Japanese)	Name
November 19, 1876	特命全権公使	Minister Plenipotentiary	河瀬 真孝	Kawase Masataka
December 12, 1876	臨時代理公使	Chargé d'affaires ad interim	桜田 親義	Sakurada Chikayoshi
June 10, 1878	臨時代理公使	Chargé d'affaires ad interim	中村 博愛	Nakamura Hironari
July 8, 1880	特命全権公使	Minister Plenipotentiary	鍋島 直大	Nabeshima Naohiro
June 18, 1882	特命全権公使	Minister Plenipotentiary	浅野 長勲	Asano Nagakoto
June 5, 1884	臨時代理公使	Chargé d'affaires ad interim	山内 勝明	Yamauchi Katsuaki
September 3, 1884	特命全権公使	Minister Plenipotentiary	田中 不二麿	Tanaka Fujimaro
October 1, 1887	臨時代理公使	Chargé d'affaires ad interim	黒川 誠一郎	Kurokawa Seiichirō
November 27, 1887	特命全権公使	Minister Plenipotentiary	徳川 篤敬	Tokugawa Atsuyoshi
December 10, 1890	臨時代理公使	Chargé d'affaires ad interim	鮫島 武之助	Sameshima Takenosuke
January 12, 1893	特命全権公使	Minister Plenipotentiary	中島 信行	Nakajima Nobuyuki
July 15, 1893	臨時代理公使	Chargé d'affaires ad interim	姉小路 公義	Anegakōji Kimitomo
September 7, 1894	特命全権公使	Minister Plenipotentiary	高平 小五郎	Takahira Kogorō
January 12, 1896	臨時代理公使	Chargé d'affaires ad interim	安達 峰一郎	Adachi Mineichirō
June 8, 1896	特命全権公使	Minister Plenipotentiary	栗野 慎一郎	Kurino Shinichirō
June 1, 1897	臨時代理公使	Chargé d'affaires ad interim	市来 政方	Ichiki Masakata
October 15, 1897	特命全権公使	Minister Plenipotentiary	牧野 伸顕	Makino Nobuaki
July 29, 1906	臨時代理公使	Chargé d'affaires ad interim	日下部 三九郎	Kusakabe Sangurō
February 26, 1907	臨時代理大使	Chargé d'affaires ad interim	日下部 三九郎	Kusakabe Sangurō
May 20, 1907	特命全権大使	Ambassador	高平 小五郎	Takahira Kogorō
February 3, 1908	臨時代理大使	Chargé d'affaires ad interim	亀山 松次郎	Kameyama Matsujirō
November 8, 1908	特命全権大使	Ambassador	林 権助	Hayashi Gonsuke
January 8, 1913	臨時代理大使	Chargé d'affaires ad interim	篠野 乙次郎	Shinono Otsujirō
December 4, 1913	特命全権大使	Ambassador	林 権助	Hayashi Gonsuke
May 4, 1916	特命全権大使	Ambassador	伊集院 彦吉	Ijūin Hikokichi
December 28, 1919	臨時代理大使	Chargé d'affaires ad interim	堀田 正昭	Hotta Masaaki
September 4, 1920	特命全権大使	Ambassador	落合 謙太郎	Ochiai Kentarō
November 30, 1921	臨時代理大使	Chargé d'affaires ad interim	諸井 六郎	Moroi Rokurō
July 14, 1922	特命全権大使	Ambassador	落合 謙太郎	Ochiai Kentarō
April 30, 1926	臨時代理大使	Chargé d'affaires ad interim	森 安三郎	Mori Yasusaburō
September 15, 1926	特命全権大使	Ambassador	松田 道一	Matsuda Michikazu
October 26, 1929	臨時代理大使	Chargé d'affaires ad interim	吉沢 清次郎	Yoshizawa Seijirō
February 5, 1931	臨時代理大使	Chargé d'affaires ad interim	岡本 武三	Okamoto Takezō
March 17, 1931	特命全権大使	Ambassador	吉田 茂	Yoshida Shigeru
August 15, 1932	臨時代理大使	Chargé d'affaires ad interim	岡本 武三	Okamoto Takezō
December 15, 1932	特命全権大使	Ambassador	松島 肇	Matsushima Hajime
June 23, 1934	臨時代理大使	Chargé d'affaires ad interim	岩手 嘉雄	Iwate Yoshio
September 4, 1934	臨時代理大使	Chargé d'affaires ad interim	張間 利春	Harima Toshiharu
November 24, 1934	特命全権大使	Ambassador	杉村 陽太郎	Sugimura Yōtarō
July 25, 1937	特命全権大使	Ambassador	堀田 正昭	Hotta Masaaki
October 21, 1938	臨時代理大使	Chargé d'affaires ad interim	寺崎 太郎	Terasaki Tarō
November 24, 1938	臨時代理大使	Chargé d'affaires ad interim	阪本 瑞男	Sakamoto Tamao
December 9, 1938	特命全権大使	Ambassador	白鳥 敏夫	Shiratori Toshio
September 14, 1939	臨時代理大使	Chargé d'affaires ad interim	阪本 瑞男	Sakamoto Tamao
November 13, 1939	特命全権大使	Ambassador	天羽 英二	Amō Eiji
December 5, 1940	特命全権大使	Ambassador	堀切 善兵衛	Horikiri Zenbe
October 28, 1942	臨時代理大使	Chargé d'affaires ad interim	加瀬 俊一	Kase Shunichi
April 28, 1943	特命全権大使	Ambassador	日高 信六郎	Hidaka Shinrokurō
January 23, 1946	Closed following the Japanese surrender of World War II			
November 15, 1951	在ローマ在外事務所長	Chief of the Japanese Government's Overseas Agency in Rome	井上 孝治郎	Inoue Kōjirō
April 28, 1952	臨時代理大使	Chargé d'affaires ad interim	井上 孝治郎	Inoue Kōjirō
October 9, 1952	特命全権大使	Ambassador	原田 健	Harada Ken
November 10, 1955	臨時代理大使	Chargé d'affaires ad interim	高橋 覚	Takahashi Satoru
March 3, 1956	特命全権大使	Ambassador	太田 一郎	Ōta Ichirō
March 1, 1959	臨時代理大使	Chargé d'affaires ad interim	白幡 友敬	Shirahata Tomoyoshi
May 2, 1959	特命全権大使	Ambassador	鈴木 九萬	Suzuki Tadakatsu
May 26, 1961	臨時代理大使	Chargé d'affaires ad interim	広瀬 達夫	Hirose Tatsuo
June 14, 1961	特命全権大使	Ambassador	門脇 季光	Kadowaki Suemitsu
November 30, 1963	臨時代理大使	Chargé d'affaires ad interim	沢木 正男	Sawaki Masao
July 28, 1964	特命全権大使	Ambassador	中川 融	Nakagawa Tōru
August 25, 1965	臨時代理大使	Chargé d'affaires ad interim	沢木 正男	Sawaki Masao
October 10, 1965	特命全権大使	Ambassador	与謝野 秀	Yosano Shigeru
November 26, 1967	臨時代理大使	Chargé d'affaires ad interim	矢野 泰男	Yano Yasuo
December 4, 1967	特命全権大使	Ambassador	田付 景一	Tatsuke Keiichi
June 18, 1969	臨時代理大使	Chargé d'affaires ad interim	片岡 秋	Kataoka Osamu
July 14, 1969	特命全権大使	Ambassador	高野 藤吉	Takano Tokichi
August 8, 1972	臨時代理大使	Chargé d'affaires ad interim	片上 一郎	Katakami Ichirō
September 14, 1972	特命全権大使	Ambassador	竹内 春海	Takeuchi Harumi
July 15, 1975	臨時代理大使	Chargé d'affaires ad interim	橋爪 三男	Hashitsume Mitsuo
November 3, 1975	特命全権大使	Ambassador	藤山 楢一	Fujiyama Naraichi
March 6, 1979	臨時代理大使	Chargé d'affaires ad interim	板橋 毅一	Itabashi Kiichi
July 16, 1979	特命全権大使	Ambassador	影井 梅夫	Kagei Umeo
August 14, 1982	臨時代理大使	Chargé d'affaires ad interim	高瀬 秀一	Takase Hidekazu
August 23, 1982	特命全権大使	Ambassador	堀 新助	Hori Shinnosuke
November 29, 1984	臨時代理大使	Chargé d'affaires ad interim	大島 弘輔	Ōshima Hirosuke
December 24, 1984	特命全権大使	Ambassador	西田 誠哉	Nishida Seiya
August 20, 1987	臨時代理大使	Chargé d'affaires ad interim	野口 雅昭	Noguchi Masaaki
August 31, 1987	特命全権大使	Ambassador	手島 冷志	Tejima Reishi
January 29, 1990	臨時代理大使	Chargé d'affaires ad interim	甲斐 紀武	Kai Noritake
June 9, 1990	特命全権大使	Ambassador	浅尾 新一郎	Asao Shinichirō

== See also ==
- Italy–Japan relations
- Diplomatic rank
