= Takeru Inukai =

Japanese politician and novelist (1896–1960)

- 犬養 健
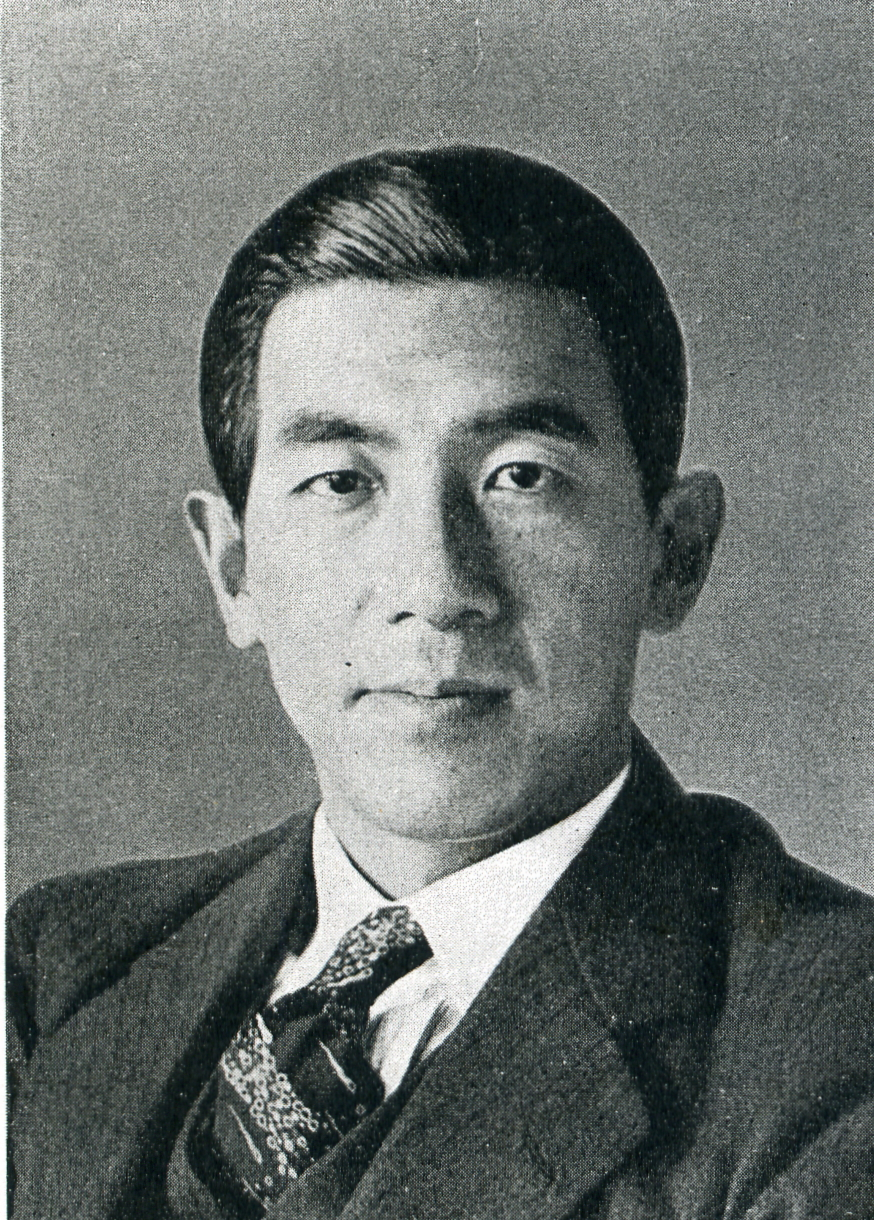
- Takeru in 1932

President of the Democratic Party
- In office 16 December 1948 – 10 February 1950
- Preceded by: Hitoshi Ashida
- Succeeded by: Position abolished

Minister of Justice
- In office 30 October 1952 – 22 April 1954
- Prime Minister: Shigeru Yoshida
- Preceded by: Tokutarō Kimura
- Succeeded by: Ryōgorō Katō

Member of the House of Representatives
- In office 24 January 1949 – 28 August 1960
- Preceded by: Shikaji Shigei
- Succeeded by: Katsushi Fujii
- Constituency: Okayama 2nd
- In office 21 February 1930 – 31 March 1947
- Preceded by: Genkichi Yano
- Succeeded by: Multi-member district
- Constituency: Tokyo 2nd (1930–1936); Okayama 2nd (1936–1946); Okayama at-large (1946–1947)

Personal details
- Born: 28 July 1896 Shinjuku, Tokyo, Japan
- Died: 28 August 1960 (aged 64) Tokyo, Japan
- Resting place: Aoyama Cemetery
- Party: Liberal Democratic (after 1955)
- Other political affiliations: Rikken Seiyūkai (1930–1940); Independent (1940–1945); Progressive (1945–1947); Democratic (1947–1950); Liberal (1950–1955)
- Children: Yasuhiko Inukai; Michiko Inukai; Kazu Ando
- Parent: Tsuyoshi Inukai (father)
- Relatives: Kenkichi Yoshizawa (brother-in-law); Momoko Ando (granddaughter); Sakura Ando (granddaughter)
- Education: Tokyo Imperial University
- Occupation: Writer (novels, stage plays)

Takeru Inukai (犬養 健, Inukai Takeru; 28 July 1896 – 28 August 1960) was a Japanese politician and novelist active in Shōwa period Japan. Also known as "Inukai Ken", he was the third son of Prime Minister of Japan Inukai Tsuyoshi.

== Early life ==
Inukai was born in the Ushigome district of Tokyo, the son of Tsuyoshi Inukai, then a member of the House of Representatives from Okayama. Their family had been village headmen during the Edo period. In 1907 his elder sister married the diplomat Kenkichi Yoshizawa.

Inukai attended the School of Philosophy in Tokyo Imperial University, but he left without graduating and became a writer. Interested in literature from his student days, he gravitated to the Shirakaba ("White Birch") literary society due to its liberal and humanistic outlook. His works were influenced by Mushanokōji Saneatsu and Nagayo Yoshirō. He became a member of the Japanese chapter of the International PEN. Inukai married Nagayo's niece Nakako

== Political career ==
In the 1930 House of Representatives election, Inukai was elected for the Rikken Seiyūkai party to a constituency in Tokyo. The following year his father was appointed prime minister and Inukai became as his secretary.

Tsuyoshi Inukai was assassinated in the May 15 Incident of 1932. The assassins had also intended to kill the comedian Charlie Chaplin, who was a guest of the prime minister, but Takeru Inukai had taken Chaplin to see a sumo match, likely saving both their lives. After his father's death, Inukai left his Tokyo constituency to take over his father's constituency in Okayama.

Inukai served as parliamentary counsellor to the Ministry of Communications under the First Konoe Cabinet. When the Rikken Seiyūkai split in 1939, he was part of the neutral faction led by Tsuneo Kanemitsu. He was held for questioning by the police in relation to the Sorge Spy Incident.

As his father had always supported friendly relations with China, Inukai had contacts and good relations with Chinese politicians during the pre-war period. After his father's assassination in the May 15 Incident, he continued to strive for restoration of good Sino-Japanese relations, and especially provided support to the Wang Jingwei government in hopes that it would bring the stability that would allow Japan to withdraw its troops from the China quagmire. Thus throughout 1938 until the formation of the Reorganized National Government of the Republic of China in 1940, he negotiated with Gao Zongwu and Mei Siping to come to a peace agreement with Chiang Kai-shek, and after failing that, to organize the defection of Wang Jingwei.

In the 1942 General Election, Inukai was reelected as an independent candidate opposing the Imperial Rule Assistance Association.

== Post-war career ==
After the surrender of Japan in 1945, Inukai was appointed parliamentary vice minister for foreign affairs under the Shidehara cabinet. He also helped organize the Japan Progressive Party, the largest party in the diet by far when it was formed. However, as many Diet members had been affiliated to the Imperial Rule Assistance Association the party was severely hurt by purges. Out of 273 Diet members at the party's foundation 259 were purged. Inukai was an exception, as he had remained an independent throughout the war.

The party recovered somewhat in the 1946 election and became the second party after the Japan Liberal Party led by Ichiro Hatoyama. Hatoyama himself was purged and replaced with Shigeru Yoshida. The two parties formed a ruling coalition in the first Yoshida cabinet.

In March 1947 the Japan Progressive Party merged with a dissident faction led by Hitoshi Ashida in the Liberal Party to form the Democratic Party. Ashida became president of the party. After the 1947 election the new party formed a coalition government with the Japan Socialist Party led by Tetsu Katayama, with Katayama as prime minister and Ashida as deputy prime minister and foreign minister. The Katayama cabinet was brought down by internal dissension in 1948. Ashida took over as prime minister and tried to hold the coalition together, but had to resign in October 1948 due to bribery scandals. Yoshida then returned as prime minister. Ashida was arrested in December and Inukai took over as president of the Democratic Party.

After the 1949 general election, in which Yoshida was victorious, Inukai led the faction in his party which favoured coalition with Yoshida, but most of the party opposed this. In the end Inukai led his faction to merge with Yoshida's party to form the new Liberal Party in 1950.

Inukai joined the cabinet as Minister of Justice in October 1952. In the Shipbuilding Scandal of 1954, Prime Minister Yoshida pressured Inukai to use his prerogative as Minister of Justice to suspend the arrest of the secretary general of the Liberal Party Eisaku Satō for alleged corruption. Inukai did so, but resigned as Minister of Justice the following day.

Inukai participated in the conservative merger of the Liberal Party and the Democratic Party to form the Liberal Democratic Party in 1955.

Inukai died in 1960 at the age of 64. His grave is located at Aoyama Cemetery in Tokyo. His son Yasuhiko was president of Kyodo News, and his daughter Michiko (d. 2017) was an author and a philanthropist.

Political offices
| Preceded by Tokutarō Kimura | Minister of Justice; 1952−1954 | Succeeded by Ryōgorō Katō |
House of Representatives (Japan)
| Preceded by Nirō Hoshijima... | Representative for Okayama 2nd district 1948−1960; Served alongside: Nirō Hoshijima, Ryōgo Hashimoto, many others | Succeeded by Saburō Eda; Ryūtarō Hashimoto... |
| New district | Representative for Okayama at-large district 1946−1947 (purged in 1947, lifted in 1948); Served alongside: Takuichi Inoue, many others | District eliminated |
| Preceded by Tsuyoshi Inukai... | Representative for Okayama 2nd district 1936−1946; Served alongside: Tanjirō Nishimura, Gōtarō Ogawa, others | District eliminated |
| Preceded by Yadanji Nakajima... | Representative for Tokyo 2nd district 1930−1936; Served alongside: Ichirō Hatoyama, Isoo Abe, others | Succeeded by Isoo Abe... |
Party political offices
| Preceded by Yūsuke Tsurumi | Secretary-general of the Japan Progressive Party; 1945 or 1946 (under party president Chūji Machida) | Succeeded by Sadayoshi Hitotsumatsu |
| Preceded by Takao Saitō | General council chairman of the Japan Progressive Party; 1946 or 1947 (under party president Kijūrō Shidehara) | Party dissolved Merged into Democratic Party |
