= Soviet–Japanese Basic Convention =

1925 treaty between the Soviet Union and Japan

The Soviet–Japanese Basic Convention (日ソ基本条約, Nisso Kihon Jōyaku) was a treaty normalizing relations between the Empire of Japan and the Soviet Union that was signed on 20 January 1925. Ratifications were exchanged in Beijing on February 26, 1925. The agreement was registered in League of Nations Treaty Series on May 20, 1925.

== Background ==
Following the defeat of the Russian Empire in the Russo-Japanese War of 1904–1905, co-operative relations between Russia and Japan were gradually restored by four sets of treaties signed between 1907 and 1916. However, the collapse of the Romanov dynasty, followed by the October Revolution and the Japanese Siberian intervention created a strong distrust between Japan and the newly founded Soviet Union.

== Signing ==
The treaty was signed by Lev Mikhailovich Karakhan of the Soviet Union and Kenkichi Yoshizawa of Japan on 20 January 1925.

== Terms ==
Following a series of negotiations held in Beijing in 1924 and 1925, Japan agreed to extend diplomatic recognition to the Soviet Union and to withdraw its troops from the northern half of Sakhalin island. In return, the Soviet Union agreed to honor the provisions of the Treaty of Portsmouth and to re-examine all other treaties between the former Russian Empire and Japan, including the Fishery Convention of 1907. The Soviet Union granted the Empire of Japan "most favoured nation" status. In Article VI, Japan received the right to establish concessions for mineral, timber, and other natural resources.

== Aftermath ==
In January 1928, Gotō Shinpei visited the Soviet Union and negotiated for the continuation of Japanese fishing companies in Soviet waters and vice versa. Coal and oil companies, and the Imperial Japanese Navy, invested in northern Sakhalin, creating the grounds for concessions. They exported coal and petroleum to Japan, and imported equipment to the Soviet Union.

The Soviet Union would later provide the Empire of Japan with formal oil and coal concessions in Soviet Sakhalin that were expanded as late as 1939, and lasted until 1943. Japan formed the state owned firm North Sakhalin Oil (Kita-Sakhalin Oil Co., Ltd. (北樺太石油)) which extracted oil from the OKHA Oil Field (Oha Oil Field (オハ油田)) near Okha on North Sakhalin from 1926 to 1944. After the deportation of Koreans to Central Asia, some two thousand Soviet Koreans (or more) remained on northern Sakhalin for the expressed purpose of working on the Soviet-Japanese concessions (ie. joint-ventures), refuting the stated rationale for the deportation of Koreans ("to prevent the infiltration of Japanese espionage").
