= Kamata Eikichi =

Japanese politician and educator

- 鎌田 榮吉
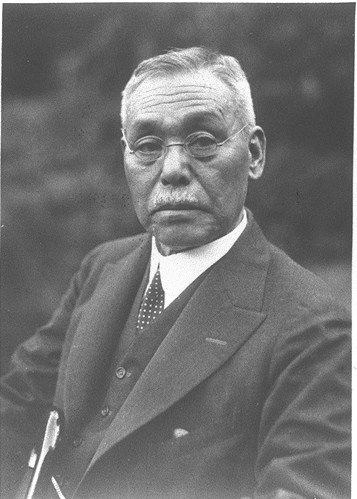

Minister of Education
- In office 12 June 1922 – 2 September 1923
- Preceded by: Nakahashi Tokugorō
- Succeeded by: Inukai Tsuyoshi

President of Keio University
- In office 1898–1922
- Preceded by: Tokujiro Obata
- Succeeded by: Ichitaro Fukuzawa

Kamata Eikichi (Japanese: 鎌田 榮吉; 1863–1934) was a Japanese politician and educator. He served as Minister of Education from 1922 until 1923, and was president of Keio University for over 20 years.

== Educational career ==
During the 1880s, Kamata was a teacher at Keio University, where he had previously been a student. Kamata succeeded Tokujiro Obata as president of the university in 1898. He left the position in 1922, and was succeeded by Kadono Ikunoshin as interim president before Ichitaro Fukuzawa took over full-time.

In his role at the university, he put across his progressive views, taking part in American customs like throwing the ceremonial first pitch in the university's newly built baseball field. Kamata was an advocate of gender equality, believing it was necessary to accompany the "equality between the classes" within post-feudal Japan. Writing in the educational-cum-movie magazine Katsudo no Sekai, he proposed the use of motion pictures for educational purposes. He also published essays in Kokuhon alongside other prominent educators and university presidents.

Alongside these progressive views, Kamata used his position at the university to push his patriotic view of independence, believing that education was key to accomplishing the goals of the nation-state. In 1920, he suggested that students "must not be deceived by deceptive ideologies nor follow the group blindly [but] realize the spirit of freedom, and independence and self-respect".

During his presidency there, Keio established its graduate programmes, established the schools of medicine and nursing, and became accredited by the Japanese government as one of the country's first private universities.

== Ministerial career ==
Kamata served as Minister of Education from 1922 until 1923. On 11 November 1922, Kamata was present at Japan's first large-scale Armistice Day celebration in Tokyo's Hibiya Park. He was one of several speakers, including Uchida Kōsai and Drew Pearson.

After he left the Ministry of Education, he was a member of the Privy Council from 1927, and head of the Imperial Council on Education in 1932.

Political offices
Preceded by Nakahashi Tokugorō	Minister of Education; 12 June 1922 – 2 September 1923	Succeeded by Inukai Tsuyoshi
