= Okayama 2nd district (1928–1942) =

Legislative district of Japan

Okayama 2nd district was a multi-member constituency of the House of Representatives in the Imperial Diet of Japan. Between 1928 and 1942 it elected five representatives by single non-transferable vote (SNTV).

It covered the western parts of Okayama, namely the Kodama, Tsukubo, Asakuchi, Oda, Shitsuki, Kibi, Jōbō, Kawakami and Atetsu counties. The predominantly rural district was usually won by a majority of Seiyūkai candidates, among them Inukai Tsuyoshi who succeeded Tanaka Giichi as party president in 1929. His son Takeru was among two candidates who were elected without Taisei Yokusankai support in the wartime election of 1942.

Following the 1946 redistricting, the area became part of the limited voting Okayama At-large district.

== Elected representatives ==
Election year	Highest vote (top tōsen)	2nd	3rd	4th	5th
1928	Ogawa Gōtarō (Minseitō)	Nishimura Tanjirō (Minseitō)	Hoshijima Nirō (Seiyūkai)	Kotani Setsuo (Seiyūkai)	Inukai Tsuyoshi (Seiyūkai)
1930	Ogawa Gōtarō (Minseitō)	Nishimura Tanjirō (Minseitō)	Inukai Tsuyoshi (Seiyūkai)	Takakusa Miyozō (Seiyūkai)	Hoshijima Nirō (Seiyūkai)
1932	Kotani Setsuo (Seiyūkai)	Inukai Tsuyoshi † (Seiyūkai)	Ogawa Gōtarō (Minseitō)	Hoshijima Nirō (Seiyūkai)	Shiraga Kuniji (Seiyūkai)
1936	Nishimura Tanjirō (Minseitō)	Inukai Takeru (Seiyūkai)	Ogawa Gōtarō (Minseitō)	Hoshijima Nirō (Seiyūkai)	Kotani Setsuo (Seiyūkai)
1937	Ogawa Gōtarō (Minseitō)	Nishimura Tanjirō (Minseitō)	Inukai Takeru (Seiyūkai)	Hoshijima Nirō (Seiyūkai)	Kotani Setsuo (Seiyūkai)
1942	Ogawa Gōtarō (Yokusan Seijitaisei Kyōgikai)	Hoshijima Nirō (Ex-Seiyūkai independent)	Inukai Takeru (Ex-Seiyūkai independent)	Kotani Setsuo (Yokusan Seijitaisei Kyōgikai)	Tsuchiya Gen'ichi (Yokusan Seijitaisei Kyōgikai)

Party affiliations as of election day; †: died in office.
