= Sadao Iguchi =

Japanese diplomat

Sadao Iguchi (井口 貞夫, 1899 – May 27, 1980) was a Japanese diplomat who served as ambassador to Canada and ambassador to the United States.

== Education ==
Iguchi attended Hitotsubashi University, before joining the Foreign Ministry.He was educated in the United Kingdom, studying at the University of Oxford from 1921 until 1924.

== Diplomatic career ==
Iguchi worked in the Japanese Consulate in New York City from 1933 until 1935, when he became Japanese consul in Chicago. He served as a counsellor in the Japanese Embassy in Washington, D.C. during the interwar period.

During World War II, he served as spokesperson for Japan's Board of Information. He was responsible for making public announcements criticising Allied actions, such as the sinking of the Awa Maru in 1945. He was removed from government during the occupation of Japan.

In 1950, he was reinstated as vice minister of foreign affairs. In 1952, he began serving as the first post-war Japanese ambassador to Canada.

On January 23, 1954, Iguchi was named the successor of Eikichi Araki as ambassador to the United States. He took up the post in March 1954. In this position, he stressed the importance of free trade for Japan to keep it from falling into Communist hands during the Cold War.

== Personal life ==
Iguchi was married to a daughter of Kenkichi Yoshizawa, and had a son, Takeo, who also served as diplomat. He died in Tokyo on May 27, 1980 after suffering from pneumonia.

== Selected writing ==
Title	Time of publication	Journal	Volume (Issue)	Page range	Unique identifier	Notes
"The Place of Japan in a Resurgent Asia"	Jul 1954	The Annals of the American Academy of Political and Social Science	294	8–13	JSTOR 1029223	

Diplomatic posts
Preceded by Seijiro Yoshizawa	Japanese Ambassador to Canada; 1952 – 1954	Succeeded by Koto Matsudaira
Preceded by Eikichi Araki	Japanese Ambassador to the United States; 1954 – 1956	Succeeded by Masayuki Tani
