= Iizaka, Fukushima =

Iizaka 飯坂町
- Former municipality
- Location in Japan
- Coordinates: 37°50′N 140°27′E
- Country: Japan
- Region: Tōhoku
- Prefecture: Fukushima prefecture
- Merged: 1964 (now part of Fukushima City)

Population (2018)
  - Total: 5,977
- Time zone: UTC+09:00 (JST)

Iizaka (飯坂町, Iizaka-machi) was a town located in the Iizaka Area (飯坂地区, Iizaka-chiku) of Shinobu District, Fukushima, Japan. On January 1, 1964, it was annexed into the city of Fukushima and is now a neighborhood within the city.

As of December 2018, the neighborhood had an estimated population of 5,977. The area is commonly referred to as Iizaka Onsen due to its many onsen, most notably Sabakoyu Onsen, a public bath located downtown and reminiscent of similar onsen of the Edo period. Iizaka is one of the most famous onsen towns in the Tōhoku region with over 70 hotels and ryokan along the banks of the Surikami River devoted to the enterprise.

The ruins of Otori Castle, built by the Sato family, (lords of Iizaka) in the 12th century and Ioji Temple are also located in Iizaka. Ioji Temple contains a "kuyo-to", a vertical slab stone monument, which has been declared an Important Prefectural Cultural Asset. The castle grounds are now a park. Ioji Temple was founded by Kōbō-Daishi, the founder of the Buddhist Shingon sect, in 827. A Yakushi Nyorai (the holy image of Siddhārtha, the founder of Buddhism) made by Kōbō-Daishi has been enshrined inside it.

== Gallery ==
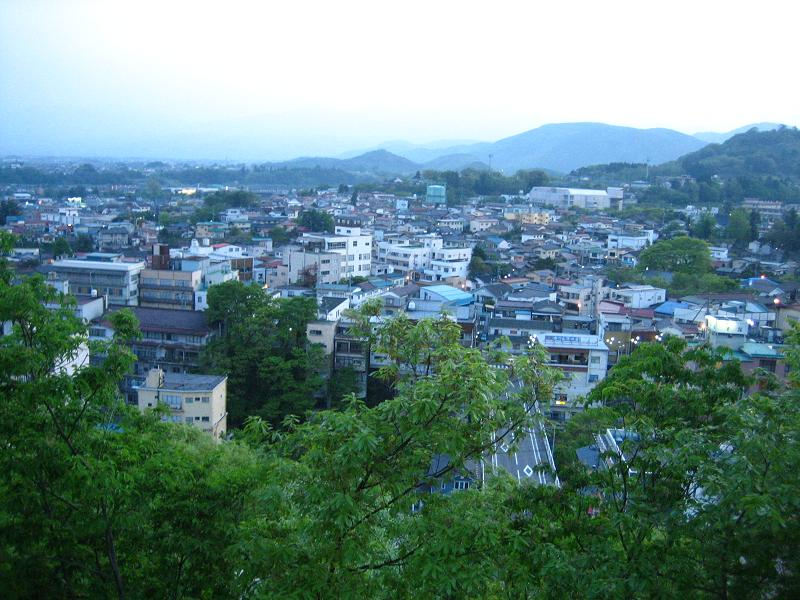
Iizaka, Fukushima as seen looking west.

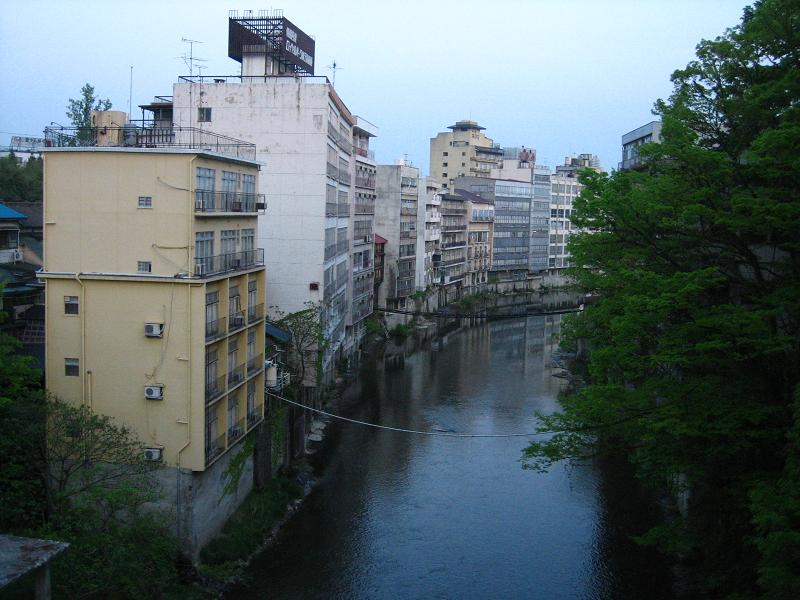
Onsen hotels in downtown Iizaka
