= Momoko Ando =

Japanese film director and novelist

- 安藤 桃子
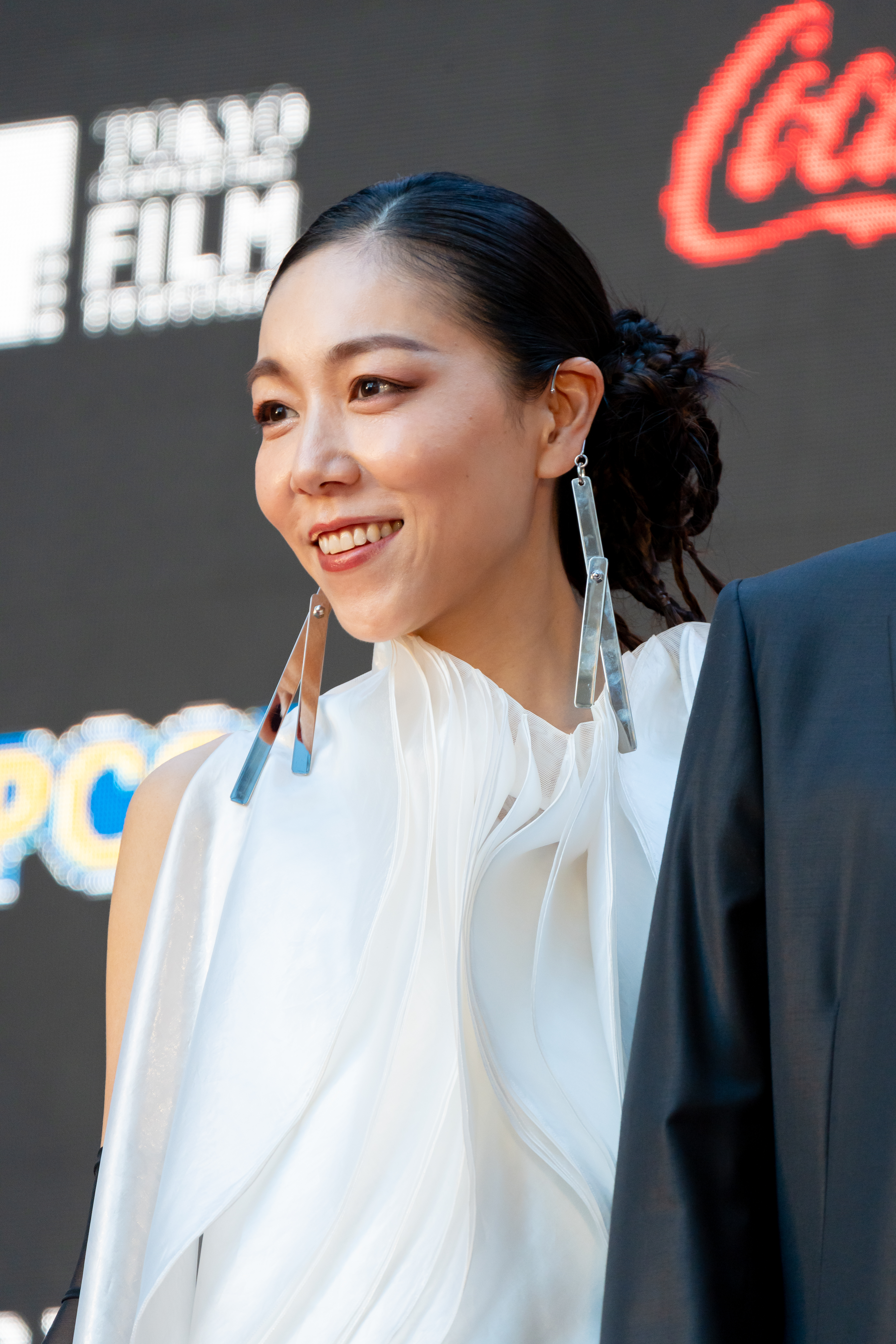
- Ando at the 36th Tokyo International Film Festival in October 2023
- Born: March 19, 1982 (age 43)
- Education: University of London
- Occupations: Film director; novelist
- Years active: 2010–present
- Spouse: Unknown (m. 2014)
- Children: 1
- Parents: Eiji Okuda (father); Kazu Ando (mother)
- Relatives: Sakura Ando (sister); Takeru Inukai (grandfather); Tasuku Emoto (brother-in-law)
- Awards: 69th Mainichi Film Awards Best Screenplay (0.5 mm)
- Website: Momoko Ando Blog

Momoko Ando (安藤 桃子, Andō Momoko, born March 19, 1982) is a Japanese film director and novelist.

== Life and career ==
Ando's father is actor Eiji Okuda and her mother the essayist Kazu Ando. She studied in the United Kingdom, and graduated from the University of London's Faculty of Arts. Later on, Ando went to New York University and learned film making, and started working as supervisory assistant.

In 2010, she made her directorial debut with the film Kakera: A Piece of Our Life based on a manga. In 2011, Ando wrote the novel 0.5 mm.

On March 14, 2014, Ando announced that she had married a non-celebrity. Simultaneously, she announced her pregnancy with her first child. Ando gave birth to the couple's first child in March 2015. In the same year, Ando made her novel 0.5 mm into the film of the same name, and served as the screenwriter and director. The film starred her sister Sakura Ando. The movie was filmed in Kōchi, Kōchi.

== Works ==
=== Films ===
※Directorial works only

Year	Title	Notes
2010	Kakera: A Piece of Our Life	Also wrote the screenplay
2014	0.5 mm	Also wrote the screenplay; second place at the 88th Kinema Junpo Best Ten

=== Novels ===
Year	Title	Notes	Ref.
2011	0.5 mm		
2014	Counter Illumination	First appeared in Gunzo	

== Filmography ==
Title	Network	Notes
Heart Net TV	NHK-E	Regular "Break Through" corner MC

=== Radio ===
Year	Title	Network	Notes
2016	Magazine House Radiofast	J-Wave	Navigator

=== Advertisements ===
Year	Title	Notes
2015	Uniqlo outerwear "Outer wa, anatada"	Co-starred with her sister Sakura Ando

== Awards ==
Award	Work	Ref.
69th Mainichi Film Awards Best Screenplay	0.5 mm	
18th New Asian Talent Award Best Director	0.5 mm	
18th New Asian Talent Award Best Outstanding Screenplay	0.5 mm	

== See also ==
- List of female film and television directors
- List of LGBT-related films directed by women
