= Toshio Sakata =

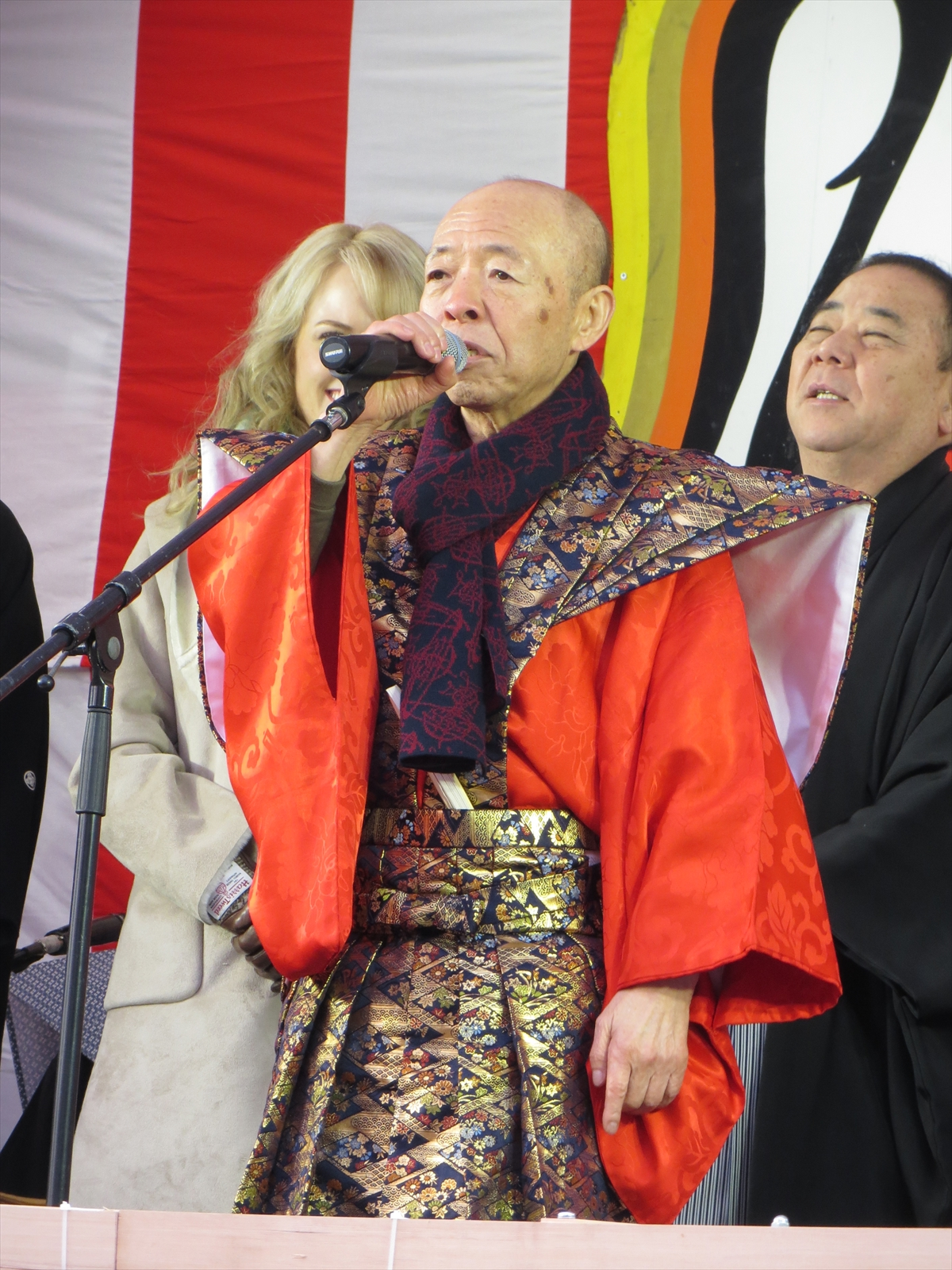
- Shown in 2015.
- Born: Jigami Toshio; October 7, 1941
- Died: December 29, 2023 (aged 82)
- Citizenship: Japan
- Occupation: Comedian
- Years active: 1967 - 2022

Toshio Sakata (7 October 1941 – 29 December 2023) was a Japanese comedian, known as part of the Comedy No. 1 duo with Goro Maeda.

== Early life ==
Sakata was born in Minato-ku, Osaka, Osaka Prefecture in October 1941. After graduating from Konohana Commercial High School (now Osaka Kaisei Gakuen High School), he worked several jobs before joining the comedy troupe Yoshimoto Shinkigeki in 1961 as a trainee, joining the troupe full-time in 1964. He would then form the Comedy No. 1 manzai duo with Goro Maeda in 1967.

== Comedy career ==
The Comedy No. 1 duo performed mainly at the Namba Kagetsu theater, where the pair's light-hearted banter won them the Newcomer Award at the 5th Kamigata Manzai Grand Prix in 1970. In 1971, the duo won the Outstanding Speech Award at the 1st NHK Kamigata Manzai Contest, also winning the Gold Award at the 1st Kamigata Comedy Grand Prix in 1972.

Sakata would gain popularity "for his idiotic character and gags such as 'Aarigato-saan' and 'A yoitose-no-korase.'"

In 1972, Sakata released the hit record "Aho no Sakata".

Over the years, he was active in a wide range of genres, including stage, television, movies and commercials. He was well known to the public, "a familiar figure to viewers at home".

After his Comedy No. 1 troupe disbanded in 2009, Sakata performed on stage as part of the Toshio Sakata Special Conte, mainly at Namba Grand Kagetsu and Yoshimoto Gion Kagetsu venues.

== Death ==
Sakata died of natural causes on December 29, 2023, surrounded by friends and family. His wake and funeral were only for close relatives.

== Legacy ==
Sakata's popularity increased as he aged, sticking to the "idiot Sakata" persona throughout his career. His relationship with Maeda was "like that of a master and disciple". Sakata never married; his parents' relationship was difficult for him.

Sakata is fondly remembered in Osaka; he would often eat there in a small cafe 15 minutes from his former home. He would always sit at a small table near the back of the cafe. He loved eggs, always ordering a rice omelette (that was not on the menu), eating only a tiny portion of rice with his order. It is said he had a small appetite; the cafe's owner would always make him a full order of rice, but noticed he never finished the meal. The owner was happy to accommodate Sakata with a smaller order as a result. Sakata was also known to frequent a barber next to the cafe, becoming a regular at both establishments. Eating lunch at the cafe after a haircut became a habit of his. The barber noted he would come every two weeks, not having much hair to get cut, but he enjoyed the routine.

An NHK program spoke with several people that he befriended at the cafe; they recall his love for children. He would often stop to talk with children and their parents. He was well known by local kindergarteners, as their bus would stop near the cafe. He enjoyed waving to them and talking with them as well.
