= Uncle and His Elephant =

- The original cover in the manga

ぞうとおじさん (Zō to ojisan)
- Manga
- Written by: Fujiko F. Fujio
- Illustrated by: Fujiko F. Fujio
- Published by: 小学館
- English publisher: Shogakukan
- Magazine: 小学三年生
- English magazine: Elementary Third Grade
- Published: August 1973

"The Elephant and the Uncle"
- Doraemon episode
- Episode no.: Episode 236
- Directed by: Ryo Motohira
- Written by: Eiichi Nakamura; Shinichi Suzuki
- Original air date: January 3, 1980

Episode chronology
← Previous "Doraemon's Surprised All Encyclopedia"	Next → "Something is Gonna Occur by 7 o'clock"

"The Elephant and the Uncle"
- Doraemon episode
- Episode no.: Episode 188
- Directed by: Sōichirō Zen
- Written by: Hiroshi Ōnogi
- Original air date: August 10, 2007

Episode chronology
← Previous "Scoop! Nobita's Secret Date"	Next → "The Hungry Master-sama"

"The Elephant and the Uncle"
- Doraemon episode
- Episode no.: Episode 867
- Directed by: Shinnosuke Yakuwa; Yoshihiro Ōsugi
- Original air date: July 28, 2017

Episode chronology
← Previous "I'm Mini Doraemon"	Next → "Star Wars in My Attic"

Uncle and His Elephant (ぞうとおじさん) is a short story in the manga and anime series Doraemon, the anime episodes were translated as The Elephant and the Uncle. It tells the story of Nobita Nobi and Doraemon traveling back in time to Japan during World War II to rescue an elephant destined for slaughter. The story is based on actual historical events, as the Japanese government ordered the slaughter of many animals in zoos during the war, including three elephants at the Ueno Zoo in Tokyo.

The story was first published in the August issue of 1973 of Elementary Third Grade (小学三年生) under the title Small light (スモールライト), and was later included in the fifth volume of the Doraemon manga series under the title Uncle and his elephant. The story was adapted into an anime episode in the 1979 TV series, released on January 3, 1980. And it was subsequently re-edited and re-released twice in the 2005 TV series, first on August 10, 2007, and later on July 28, 2017. The criticism of Japanese militarism in this story has sparked controversy in both Japan and China.

== Plot ==
Nobita's uncle Nobirou (のび郎) visited Nobita's family and told them a story about his childhood. He said that when he was a boy, he often went to the zoo and had a favorite elephant named "Trunk" (ハナ夫). However, during the war, he had to evacuate Tokyo and left Trunk behind. After the war, he returned to Tokyo and found out that Trunk had been killed. Nobita and Doraemon were both very angry, so they decided to go back in time and save Trunk.

They went to the wartime and found Trunk in the zoo. However, they encountered a keeper who was about to feed Trunk poisonous potatoes. Trunk recognized the poison and refused to eat. Nobita and Doraemon were both very angry, while the keeper said it was an order from the government and that they did not want the animals to escape after the bombing. The keeper went to report to the zoo's director, who was being harshly lectured by a Japanese military officer, and they argued about the elephant. Nobita suggested sending Trunk to India, while the officer refused, saying that it was not possible during wartime. Nobita and Doraemon argued that the war was almost over and that Japan was going to lose. The officer accused them of being spies from enemy countries and ordered soldiers to arrest them.

Just then, an air raid occurred, and everyone had to take cover. Trunk escaped from the damaged cage. The officer ordered the zoo to be sealed off and declared that Trunk would be killed once found. At this point, Doraemon used the Small Light to shrink Trunk and placed it inside a rocket mailbox, sending Trunk to the jungles of India.

They returned to the present time and continued listening to the uncle's story. He said that he got lost in the Indian jungle for several days and was saved by Trunk. Nobita's father and uncle both thought it must be a dream. While Nobita and Doraemon knew that Trunk had safely arrived in India and was still alive.

=== Adaptation in anime ===
In the 1980 version, Trunk's current situation was added at the end, showing that he had bonded with a female elephant and had two baby elephants.

In the 2007 version, the uncle was changed to an old man that Nobita and his friends met at the zoo.

In the 2017 version, the uncle's name was changed to Nobishirou (のび四郎), and it was added that he is a wildlife photographer.

In the original story, Trunk was sent away before the Japanese soldiers discovered him. While in the 2017 version, Trunk saved the military officer who was trapped under debris during an air raid. The officer was moved by Trunk's kindness and allowed Doraemon to send Trunk away.

== Historical background ==
Before the war, Ueno Zoo housed three elephants: two females named "Tonky" and "Wanri", and a male named "John". In 1943, the zoo carried out a mass killing of animals based on the "Predator Extermination" (猛獣処分) issued by the Mayor of Tokyo, Shigeo Ōdachi. Within a month, a total of 27 individuals from 14 different species were either poisoned, starved, or directly killed by various means. Except for some small animals not covered by the order, only Wanri survived temporarily due to her ability to recognize poisonous food and the secret feeding provided by the zookeepers. However, she was eventually killed on September 23 under the orders of Shigeo Ōdachi. Statistics indicate that all Japanese zoos killed approximately 300 animals between 1944 and 1945. Similar events occurred in zoos located in the Japanese-controlled Northeast China and Taiwan.

The official explanation from the Japanese government for this policy was to prevent animals from escaping and threatening people if the cages were damaged during air raids. However, Ian Jared Miller does not agree with this explanation. He believes that the government couldn't tolerate people enjoying themselves in zoos during wartime. They used this cruel practice to brainwash the Japanese people and prepare them to sacrifice their lives for the "empire" as if they were animals.

== Impact ==
A panel of the manga featuring Nobita and Doraemon. The panel said, Nobita (Right): Don't worry, if it is about the war, it will end soon. Doraemon (Left): Japan lost the war.

The 2017 reset version is the first episode of the "Power Up Doraemon", directed by Shinnosuke Yakuwa and supervised by Yoshihiro Ōsugi. It introduced a better animation quality similar to that of the movies and featured a new title sequence. In an interview, Yakuwa mentioned that he had always been interested in the animals that were killed during wars. They conducted thorough research into the emotions and history of war related to the story.

Ōsugi added that creating content related to war required a great deal of determination and courage. They recognized that if not handled properly, this story could easily become a simple heart-warming tale. However, they believed that this story was distinct from traditional war-related works because the characters, Doraemon and Nobita, who traveled back in time, had modern thoughts and were unafraid to express their opinions to the people of that era. This allowed them to bring about change in the people of that time, making it a unique take on war-related storytelling.

An article in the People's Daily proposed that the 2017 version of the animation conveys a thematic message closer to the manga. The scene where Trunk saved the Japanese military officer, leading him to rediscover his conscience, shows the profound impact of war on people's hearts and the destructive effect of war on human nature. This, in turn, at a higher level, questions Japan's involvement in the war and illustrates the Japanese people's desire that war should not be waged.

In this episode, Doraemon and Nobita mention "Japan lost the war" cheerfully, which was seen as a just perspective on the history of the Second Sino-Japanese War by Chinese netizens, while labelled as "anti-Japan" by Japanese right-wing forces.

== Related works ==
- Faithful Elephants by Yukio Tsuchiya, the story in Doraemon is believed to be influenced by this book.
