= Baby Elephant Story: The Angel Who Descended to Earth =

- Film poster
- Directed by: Ryô Kinoshita
- Screenplay by: Nobuo Yamada
- Based on: Faithful Elephants by Yukio Tsuchiya
- Produced by: Yoshimasa Onisi; Junichi Shinsaka
- Starring: Tetsuya Takeda; Kurara Haruka; Midori Hagio; Toshiyuki Nagashima; Nobuyo Ōyama
- Cinematography: Shōhei Andō
- Edited by: Yoshitami Kuroiwa
- Music by: Kentarō Haneda
- Production companies: Big West; Toho
- Distributed by: Toho
- Release date: July 26, 1986 (Japan)
- Running time: 106 minutes
- Country: Japan
- Language: Japanese
- Box office: ¥400 million

Baby Elephant Story: The Angel Who Descended to Earth (Japanese: 子象物語 地上に降りた天使, Hepburn: Kouzou monogatari: Chijou ni orita tenshi) is a 1986 Japanese children's drama film directed by Ryô Kinoshita and written by Nobuo Yamada. The film was adapted from the 1951 short story Faithful Elephants by Yukio Tsuchiya.

Baby Elephant Story stars Tetsuya Takeda in the lead role, as well as Kurara Haruka, Midori Hagio, Toshiyuki Nagashima and Nobuyo Ōyama. It was theatrically released on July 26, 1986, by Toho. The film was a box office success in Japan.

== Premise ==
Tokyo Fujimi Zoo (based on the real-life Ueno Zoo) is home to two beloved Indian elephants. Sakura, the zoo's female elephant, gives birth to a daughter. Elephant caretaker Shota Tanabe (Tetsuya Takeda) names her Hanako. Shortly afterwards, Shota's wife Setsuko (Midori Hagio) gives birth to a son. As Hanako grows, she quickly becomes a favorite of the local schoolchildren, including Shota's son. But their happiness does not last, as the arrival of the Pacific War brings hardship and rationing in its wake. The situation reaches a breaking point when the military orders the euthanasia of animals in zoos across Japan, including Fujimi's prized elephants. Shota is devastated by this news. Determined to save what he can, Shota convinces Major Keiji Okamoto (Toshiyuki Nagashima), a former classmate, to commence an operation to secretly evacuate Hanako by train.

== Cast ==
- Tetsuya Takeda as Shota Tanabe (Tokyo Fujimi Zookeeper)
- Kurara Haruka as Sachiko Kogure (Akimoto's Fiancée/Pianist)
- Midori Hagio as Setsuko Tanabe (Shota's Wife)
- Toshiyuki Nagashima as Keiji Akimoto (Army Major)
- Nobuyo Ōyama as Momoyo (Shota's Mother)
- Mari Mizutani as Mariko Kurita (Director Kurita's Daughter)
- Chōichirō Kawarasaki as Hideo Hayakawa
- Kan Mikami as Kikuo Yokoyama (Akimoto's Sidecar Driver/Army Sergeant)
- LaSalle Ishii as Genji Oshima
- Noboru Mitani as Kiyoshi Saito
- Shigeru Kōyama as Masahiro Murakami
- Akira Nagoya as Shoichi Takahashi (Director of Tokyo Fujimi Zoo)
- Yūki Meguro as Chief of Staff
- Hideji Ōtaki as Hiroshi Kurita (Director of Nagano Zoo)

== Background ==
The film was inspired by Yukio Tsuchiya's short story Faithful Elephants, originally published in 1951 and later republished in illustrated form in 1970 (first published in the English language in 1979 as Poor Elephants). Faithful Elephants was marketed as a true story, but contains multiple fictionalized elements. For instance, the book claims that the Japanese Army requested that every zoo in Japan poison their large or dangerous animals because they were worried that the animals would escape and harm the general public if bombs were detonated nearby. In truth, the recently installed governor of Tokyo, Shigeo Ōdachi, decided in August 1943 (a time when there was little threat of bombing in the country) to slaughter the animals and use their deaths as propaganda. His order was carried out in Ueno Zoo with unusual and unnecessary cruelty by acting zoo director Saburō Fukuda. There have been several critiques of the author's use of fictionalized story elements.

== Production ==
Screenwriter Nobuo Yamada was notable for writing several films for director Koreyoshi Kurahara. Yoshitami Kuroiwa was a renowned editor who had worked on such films as The Sword of Doom and The Return of Godzilla, among many others. Cinematographer Shōhei Andō had earlier shot Enrai and Muddy River, and would later serve as co-cinematographer on Hiroshima for directors Koreyoshi Kurahara and Roger Spottiswoode.

The elephant transport scene was filmed with cooperation from the Oigawa Railway in Shizuoka Prefecture.

== Music ==
The film's score was composed by Kentarō Haneda. It consists of 17 tracks. Its theme song is "Angel Who Descended to Earth" (地上に降りた天使, Chijō ni Orita Tenshi), performed by Mari Mizutani, one of the film's stars. The soundtrack was distributed on CD and vinyl formats by Victor Entertainment.

== Release ==
Baby Elephant Story was theatrically released on July 26, 1986, by Toho. It grossed ¥400 million at the Japanese box office. The film was later released on VHS and LaserDisc.
