= Faithful Elephants =

1951 Japanese children's book

- The Japanese illustrated edition cover from August 1970
- Author: Yukio Tsuchiya (土家由岐雄)
- Original title: かわいそうなぞう
- Translator: Tomoko Tsuchiya Dykes
- Illustrator: Motoichirō Takebe (Japanese), Ted Lewin (English)
- Cover artist: Motoichirō Takebe (Japanese), Ted Lewin (English)
- Language: Japanese
- Subject: Disposal of zoo animals during wartime
- Genre: Children's book
- Set in: Ueno Zoo in the Pacific War
- Publisher: Kinnohoshi (Japanese), Houghton Mifflin (English)
- Publication date: 1951
- Publication place: Japan
- English publication date: 1979
- Pages: 32
- ISBN: 978-4-323-00211-8 (978-0-395-86137-0 for English)
- OCLC: 41578301

Faithful Elephants (Japanese: かわいそうなぞう, Hepburn: Kawaisō na Zō; lit. "Poor Elephants") is a short story written by Yukio Tsuchiya and originally published in Japan in 1951 (first published in English in 1979, and republished in 1988). The story was later expanded into an illustrated children's novel in 1970, with illustrations by Takebe Motoichiro. It was published and marketed as a true story of the elephants in Tokyo's Ueno Zoo during World War II, but contained fiction.

According to the book, the Imperial Japanese Army had requested that every zoo in Japan poison their large or dangerous animals because they were worried that these animals would escape and harm the general public if bombs were detonated nearby (in truth, politician Shigeo Ōdachi had given the order and planned to use the animals' deaths as propaganda; his order was carried out with unusual and unnecessary cruelty by acting zoo director Saburō Fukuda). The poison that worked on the other animals did not work on the three remaining Indian elephants, who detected the poison and refused to eat it. As a result, the elephants were starved to death. The animals killed are commemorated at the zoo with a cenotaph. Tsuchiya reportedly wrote the book to inform children of the grief, fear, and sadness caused by war.

Youth literature scholars, notably Professor Emeritus Kay E. Vandergrift, Rutgers, Department of Library and Information Science, have contested the claim that the story is factual, referring to it as "historical fiction for children". Dr. Betsy Hearne, University of Illinois at Urbana-Champaign, writes: "Certainly a story can be culturally confusing, as was Yukio Tsuchiya's The Faithful Elephants: A True Story of Animals, People, and War (1988), which turned out to be a legend, and a complex one at that."

Ushio Hasegawa, a Japanese critic of children's literature, wrote that he had doubts about various elements of Faithful Elephants, and that this led him to begin seriously studying children's novels with themes of war. In September 1981, Hasegawa published a critique of the story, titled "The Elephant is Poor Too", in the inaugural issue of Quarterly Children's Literature Criticism. He criticized Tsuchiya for changing the timeline of events, particularly for eliding the time that elapsed between the slaughter and the air raids on Japan. Hasegawa also explored problems with children's novels more broadly, particularly those that deal with the culling of animals in war. Hasegawa's critique caught the eye of an NHK producer, and a documentary based on his essay, Soshite Tonkī mo shinda (lit. And then, Tonkī also died), was aired in August 1982. In November of the same year, a picture book version of the documentary (written by Mamoru Tanabe and illustrated by Ayuta Kaji) was published by Kokudosha.

The story served as a major plot point in the Doraemon manga short and animated episode Uncle and His Elephant, as well as episode 5 of the anime adaptation of Mitsuboshi Colors. It also inspired the 1982 anime film Zô no Inai Dôbutsuen (lit. Zoo Without an Elephant), directed by Tsuneo Maeda and produced by Group TAC, as well as the 1986 live action film Baby Elephant Story: The Angel Who Descended to Earth.
