= List of Doraemon chapters =

The Japanese children's manga series Doraemon was written and illustrated by Fujiko F. Fujio. In December 1969, it was serialized in various children's manga magazines published by Shogakukan.

Over 1300 short episodes have been made. Of those, 821 episodes were collected in tankōbon by Shogakukan under Tentoumusi comics (てんとう虫コミックス) imprint. The first volume was published on July 31, 1974, and the last forty-fifth volume on April 26, 1996. The series is about a robotic cat named Doraemon, who travels back in time from the 22nd century to aid a pre-teen boy called Nobita Nobi (野比 のび太, Nobi Nobita).

From 2013 to 2016, KE volumes 1-200 translated into English were released in North America.

From 2013 to 2016, Doraemon Kindle Edition volume 1–200 released digitally in English in full-color via the Amazon Kindle e-book service.

== Releases ==
=== English releases ===
The manga is in full-color available in English on Amazon Kindle in North America. As of October 16, 2016, a total of 200 volumes have been released. On December 27, 2017, the 17 Doraemon Long Stories volumes that were written by Fujiko F. Fujio were also released in full-color on Amazon Kindle.

The same translation of the Doraemon manga used on Amazon Kindle has been published in English in print by Shogakukan Asia. Unlike the Amazon Kindle releases these volumes are in black and white instead of color.

1. 27 August 2014, ~258-264 pages, ISBN 9789810903107
2. 27 August 2014, 264 pages, ISBN 9789810903114
3. 26 November 2014, 248 pages, ISBN 9789810903121
4. 26 November 2014, ~241-248 pages, ISBN 9789810903138
- Doraemon Box Set (volume 1 to 4), 2014/11, ISBN 9789810932985

The same translation of the Doraemon manga used on Amazon Kindle has also been published in English in print, in six compilation volumes based on the Japanese 1994 Shogakukan Colo Novel releases, also by Shogakukan Asia, as the Doraemon Theme Series. Unlike the Amazon Kindle releases these volumes are in black and white instead of color.

1. Romance Collection, 15 January 2020, ~130-132 pages, ISBN 9789811417023
2. Zero Points & Runaway Collection, 15 January 2020, ~191-192 pages, ISBN 9789811417030
3. Dinosaurs Collection, 14 February 2020, ~162-163 pages, ISBN 9789811417047
4. Future & Universe Collection, 14 February 2020, ~137-148 pages, ISBN 9789811421693
5. Folktales Collection, 16 March 2020, ~123-124 pages, ISBN 9789811421709
6. Emotions Collection, 16 March 2020, ~132-168 pages, ISBN 9789811421716
7. Laughter Collection, 17 July 2020, 142 pages, ISBN 9789811421723
8. Horror Collection, 17 July 2020, 141 pages, ISBN 9789811421730
9. Esprit Collection, 25 September 2020, 152 pages, ISBN 9789811433504
10. Fantasy Collection, 25 September 2020, 192 pages, ISBN 9789811433511

=== Bilingual releases ===
==== 2002–2005 ====
There have been two series of bilingual, Japanese and English, volumes of Doraemon by SHOGAKUKAN ENGLISH COMICS called "Doraemon: Gadget Cat from the Future", and two audio versions.

1. 2002/02/22, ISBN 4092270119
2. 2002/05/31, ISBN 4092270127
3. 2002/08/30, ISBN 4092270135
4. 2002/11/29, ISBN 4092270143
5. 2003/02/28, ISBN 4092270151
6. 2003/05/30, ISBN 409227016X
7. 2003/12/05, ISBN 4092270178
8. 2004/03/26, ISBN 4092270186
9. 2004/10/07, ISBN 4092270194
10. 2005/02/25, ISBN 4092270208
- Box Set (volume 1 to 10), March 28, 2006, ISBN 9784092270213

Translations of these volumes were published as 英文版哆啦A夢 by 青文出版社 (CHING WIN PUBLISHING Co., Ltd.) in Taiwan, in Chinese by Chuang Yi, in Thailand by NED-Comics, in mainland China by 二十一世紀出版社 (21st Century Publishing House), in Hong Kong by 香港青文出版社 and in Vietnam by Kim Dong Publisher as Đôrêmon học tiếng Anh.

==== 2013–2014 ====
1. A Selection of Touching Stories, 2013/10/18, ISBN 9784092270336
2. A Selection of Comic Stories, 2013/12/18, ISBN 9784092270343
3. A Selection of Love Stories, 2014/02/18, ISBN 9784092270350
4. A Selection of Witty Stories, 2014/04/18, ISBN 9784092270367
5. A Selection of Scary Stories, 2014/06/18, ISBN 9784092270374
6. A Selection of Fantastic Stories, 2014/08/18, ISBN 9784092270381

==== Audio version ====
1. 2009/4/22, ISBN 9784092270312
2. 2009/5/20, ISBN 9784092270329

== Chapters list ==
A list of all episodes of Doraemon short stories based on the Kindle Edition.

=== Kindle Edition ===
The series was translated into English and released in North America. Black and white manuscripts are digitally colored. 200 volumes. 1311 episodes. Almost all existing Doraemon short stories are included. Abbreviated as "KE".

- All episode list of Doraemon Kindle Edition (with 9 unrecorded episodes).
- In the "Other Book" column, another book containing that episode is posted.
  - TC - Tentōmushi Comics (てんとう虫コミックス). Volume 1–45.
  - DP - Doraemon Plus (ドラえもんプラス). Volume 1–6.
  - DCW - Doraemon Color Works (ドラえもんカラー作品集). Volume 1–6.
  - CWF - The Complete Works of Fujiko F. Fujio (藤子・F・不二雄大全集) Doraemon Volume 1–20. Only episodes not published in the above books.
- "First Release" - The year that episode was first released.
- "Rel. #" - Release number. Click to sort by publication order.
- See ja:ドラえもんの漫画エピソード一覧 for Published magazine name.

#	Vol	Episode Title	Original Title (Japanese)	Other Book	First Release	Rel. #
1	1	All the Way From the Future	未来の国からはるばると	TC1	1969	1
2	1	Return to Un-sender	出さない手紙の返事をもらう方法	TC2	1974	274
3	1	Noby's City of Dreams	ゆめの町ノビタランド	TC3	1974	303
4	2	Lionman's Big Jam	あやうし! ライオン仮面	TC3	1971	101
5	2	Shadowhunting	かげがり	TC1	1971	105
6	2	Judo Master Noby	黒おびのび太	TC5	1971	114
7	3	A World Without Sound	音のない世界	TC16	1977	514
8	3	A Stone Unturned	石ころぼうし	TC4	1973	197
9	3	Noby's Bride	のび太のおよめさん	TC6	1972	133
10	4	Memories of Grandma	おばあちゃんのおもいで	TC4	1970	62
11	4	Doublixir	バイバイン	TC17	1978	571
12	4	The White Lily Girl	白ゆりのような女の子	TC3	1970	31
13	4	Planet Builders	地球製造法	TC5	1973	190
14	5	A High-Speed Slow-Down	のろのろ、じたばた	TC5	1971	87
15	5	King of the Cavemen	石器時代の王さまに	TC7	1971	118
16	5	Noby's Birthday	ぼくの生まれた日	TC2	1972	157
17	5	Fossil Fools	化石大発見!!	TC11	1976	426
18	5	Defender of Justice: Masked Me!	正義のみかたセルフ仮面	TC12	1976	444
19	6	The Great Paper War	紙工作が大あばれ	TC17	1977	559
20	6	A Touching Tale	ジ～ンと感動する話	TC9	1975	363
21	6	Polarity Patches	N・Sワッペン	TC2	1973	213
22	6	The Pocket Patch	タタミのたんぼ	TC2	1973	265
23	6	Animal Transformation Crackers	変身ビスケット	TC1	1974	288
24	7	A Hermit's Life for Me	デンデンハウスは気楽だな	TC9	1975	368
25	7	The Over-the-Top Overcoat	オーバーオーバー	TC13	1976	476
26	7	Topsy Turvy Planet	あべこべ惑星	TC17	1978	600
27	7	Puddle Powder	ドンブラ粉	TC12	1976	442
28	7	Realpedia	ほんもの図鑑	TC6	1971	127
29	8	Far, Far From Home	家がだんだん遠くなる	TC14	1977	507
30	8	The Happy Little Mermaid	しあわせな人魚姫	TC19	1979	685
31	8	Melody Gas	メロディーガス	TC4	1971	126
32	8	Making a Brother	弟をつくろう	TC10	1975	407
33	8	Will-O-Whisperer	怪談ランプ	TC2	1973	237
34	9	Hunch-Hopper	よかん虫	TC12	1976	443
35	9	Phoony the Typhoon	台風のフー子	TC6	1974	319
36	9	U.F Yo!	未知とのそうぐう機	TC17	1978	580
37	9	Noby's Marathon	のび太が九州まで走った!!	TC18	1978	581
38	9	Fishing Indoors	勉強べやのつりぼり（勉強部屋のつりぼり）	TC12	1976	473
39	10	My Little Kitty	すてきなミイちゃん	TC14	1973	185
40	10	The Curse Camera	のろいのカメラ	TC4	1970	56
41	10	Tummy Travelers	たとえ胃の中、水の中	TC10	1975	393
42	10	Homing Missile	ミサイルが追ってくる	TC12	1976	430
43	10	Weekly Nobita	週刊のび太	TC17	1978	588
44	11	Close Encounter	ハロー宇宙人	TC13	1976	455
45	11	Amazing Maze	ホームメイロ	TC18	1978	637
46	11	Tales of Future Magazines	百年後のフロク	TC10	1976	412
47	11	Noby's Dinosaur	のび太の恐竜	TC10	1975	385
48	12	Funbrellas	おかしなおかしなかさ	TC19	1977	567
49	12	My Home Mountain	大雪山がやってきた	TC19	1979	699
50	12	The 2-dehydrator Camera	チッポケット二次元カメラ	TC20	1979	681
51	12	Dream Dad	夢まくらのおじいさん	TC14	1976	477
52	12	The Girlfriend Catalog	ガールフレンドカタログ	TC18	1978	594
53	13	King of the Night	夜の世界の王さまだ!	TC6	1971	125
54	13	Happy Little Planet	しあわせのお星さま	TC18	1978	628
55	13	The Six Million Yen Painting	この絵600万円	TC6	1972	176
56	13	The Action Planner	スケジュールどけい	TC3	1973	203
57	13	The Conscience Cricket	ペコペコバッタ	TC1	1970	55
58	14	The Wolf Family	オオカミ一家	TC2	1973	254
59	14	Switching Moms	ママをとりかえっこ	TC3	1974	280
60	14	Reaction Tester Robot	テスト・ロボット	TC7	1974	339
61	14	The Lying Mirror	うそつきかがみ	TC2	1971	97
62	14	You and What Army?	おもちゃの兵隊	TC4	1974	309
63	15	Sweetstick	おせじ口べに	TC1	1972	167
64	15	The Tax-myna Cometh	税金鳥	TC22	1979	697
65	15	The Bottle Cap Collection	王かんコレクション	TC9	1975	388
66	15	The Devil Card	デビルカード	TC22	1980	752
67	15	Radish Rampage	だいこんダンスパーティー	TC21	1979	654
68	16	Sokay Stick	まあまあ棒	TC23	1980	808
69	16	The Sleep War	出木杉グッスリ作戦	TC22	1980	787
70	16	The Stuporsonic Verminator	驚音波発振機（狂音波発振機）	TC17	1978	582
71	16	The Vending Time Machine	自動販売タイムマシン	TC11	1975	401
72	16	Pandora's Monster	パンドラのお化け	TC19	1979	668
73	17	No Matter the Price	お金がわいて出た話	TC18	1979	660
74	17	The BrYber Tactic	Yロウ作戦	TC11	1976	438
75	17	My Dad the Baby	パパもあまえんぼ	TC16	1977	539
76	17	Defeat the Giantz!	ジャイアンズをぶっとばせ	TC7	1974	331
77	17	The Delete Key	どくさいスイッチ	TC15	1977	517
78	18	The Amazing Nobyman	行け! ノビタマン	TC21	1979	695
79	18	The Gratitude Adjuster	ありがたみわかり機	TC19	1978	625
80	18	Worse Than Me	ぼくよりダメなやつがきた	TC23	1980	769
81	18	Moas and Dodos Forever	モアよドードーよ、永遠に	TC17	1978	624
82	19	Cloudswimming	雲の中のプール	TC14	1977	528
83	19	The Macha-Maker	メカ・メーカー	TC22	1980	745
84	19	The Around the World Quiz	クイズは地球をめぐる	TC19	1979	644
85	19	We Lost the Time Machine!!	タイムマシンがなくなった!!	TC22	1980	749
86	19	Dogfighters	大空中戦	TC12	1976	446
87	20	The Haunted Castle	ゆうれい城へ引っこし	TC12	1976	448
88	20	"Space Demon" - the Backyard Sci-Fi Spectacle	超大作特撮映画「宇宙大魔神」	TC20	1979	704
89	20	Handmade Robot Rampage	大あばれ、手作り巨大ロボ	TC23	1980	728
90	21	Just Once, a Perfect 100	一生に一度は百点を...	TC1	1973	260
91	21	The Prophesies of Doraemon	ドラえもんの大予言	TC1	1970	7
92	21	The Antique-o-Matic	古道具競争	TC1	1970	38
93	21	From Hunter... to Warlord?	ご先祖さまがんばれ	TC1	1970	32
94	21	Hot Snow	雪でアッチッチ	TC1	1972	135
95	22	Spy Games	㊙スパイ大作戦	TC1	1970	25
96	22	The Turvy Topsy Flute	コベアベ	TC1	1972	141
97	22	Competing Proposals	プロポーズ作戦（プロポーズ大作戦）	TC1	1971	121
98	22	The Make-it-so Day Planner	○○が××と△△する	TC1	1974	293
99	22	The Skyhorse	走れ! ウマタケ	TC1	1973	268
100	22	The Genie Robot	ランプのけむりオバケ	TC1	1971	131
101	23	Memory Bread	テストにアンキパン	TC2	1972	146
102	23	Robyn, My Love	ロボ子が愛してる	TC2	1971	113
103	23	The Dream Chime	ゆめふうりん	TC2	1972	153
104	23	Honest Thomas	正直太郎	TC2	1973	238
105	23	Shizuka's Magic Robe	しずちゃんのはごろも	TC2	1973	262
106	23	The 100% Accurate Palm Reading Set	かならず当たる手相セット	TC2	1974	279
107	24	The Time Kerchief	タイムふろしき	TC2	1970	67
108	24	Dinosaur Hunters	恐竜ハンター	TC2	1970	26
109	24	Building a Subway	地下鉄をつくっちゃえ	TC2	1973	263
110	24	To Catch a Cold	このかぜ うつします	TC2	1974	272
111	24	The Bedroom Avalanche	勉強べやの大なだれ	TC2	1971	129
112	25	Junior Detective Set	シャーロック・ホームズセット	TC3	1974	273
113	25	True Lies	うそつ機	TC3	1973	195
114	25	Super Dan!	スーパーダン	TC3	1972	145
115	25	Compound Interest	ボーナス1024倍	TC3	1973	258
116	25	The Guiding Angel	ミチビキエンゼル	TC3	1973	252
117	25	The Overwriting Crayon	そっくりクレヨン	TC3	1971	124
118	25	The Calendar Flipper	日づけ変更カレンダー	TC3	1973	261
119	26	Do-it Drops	ソーナルじょう	TC3	1970	44
120	26	My Teacher, Myself	ぼくを、ぼくの先生に	TC3	1973	236
121	26	The Instant Wardrobe Cam	きせかえカメラ	TC3	1974	310
122	26	I, Luh, Luh, Love You!	ああ、好き、好き、好き!	TC3	1970	49
123	26	The Myth Medallions	おはなしバッジ	TC3	1972	149
124	26	Pero Comes Back	ペロ! 生きかえって	TC3	1971	123
125	27	The Truthbeaker	ソノウソホント	TC4	1971	107
126	27	The Reversifier	アベコンベ	TC4	1971	106
127	27	The Undersea Hike	海底ハイキング	TC4	1974	308
128	27	The Bug Concert	月の光と虫の声	TC4	1973	240
129	27	Facial Reconstruction	お客の顔を組み立てよう	TC4	1974	287
130	27	Dealing in Future	してない貯金を使う法	TC4	1973	205
131	28	The X-Ray Scope	スケスケ望遠鏡	TC4	1971	102
132	28	The Buddy Beacon	友情カプセル	TC4	1972	165
133	28	Nobizaemon's Secret	のび左エ門の秘宝	TC4	1970	73
134	28	The Phantom of the Future	未来世界の怪人	TC4	1973	189
135	28	The BubbleCorder	ヤカンレコーダー	TC4	1972	142
136	28	The Gamble Gun	ラッキーガン	TC4	1974	323
137	28	The End of the World	世界沈没	TC4	1972	171
138	29	Gravity Paint	重力ペンキ	TC5	1972	177
139	29	The Noby in the Mirror	かがみの中ののび太	TC5	1972	166
140	29	Memory Mallet	わすれとんかち	TC5	1970	61
141	29	Penalty Box	ばっ金箱	TC5	1973	211
142	29	Doraemon's Double Trouble	ドラえもんだらけ	TC5	1971	81
143	30	4D Cycling	四次元サイクリング	TC5	1973	206
144	30	The Underground Expedition	地底の国探検	TC5	1974	302
145	30	The Bounce Back Cape	ひらりマント	TC5	1973	208
146	30	Badge Busters	バッジを作ろう	TC5	1972	147
147	30	My Tub's an Ocean	うちのプールは太平洋	TC5	1974	306
148	30	Sequence Spray	つづきスプレー	TC5	1972	154
149	31	The Dreamflipper Pillow	うつつまくら	TC5	1970	50
150	31	The Big Winner	宝くじ大当たり	TC5	1971	110
151	31	The Be-There Phone	おしかけ電話	TC5	1972	163
152	31	The Uncle and the Elephant	ぞうとおじさん	TC5	1973	230
153	32	Jekyll-Hyde Jellies	ジキルハイド	TC6	1973	204
154	32	Viral Marketing Virus	流行性ネコシャクシビールス	TC6	1974	333
155	32	The Hot Springs Trip	温泉旅行	TC6	1972	180
156	32	Tabletop Ski Resort	はこ庭スキー場	TC6	1974	275
157	32	Carp Streamers	こいのぼり	TC6	1974	294
158	32	Chew-Out Gum	ダイリガム	TC6	1973	243
159	32	The Cannon Express	どこでも大砲	TC6	1972	143
160	33	Nessie's Visit	ネッシーが来る	TC6	1974	314
161	33	The Girl with the Red Shoes	赤いくつの女の子	TC6	1974	317
162	33	The Ace Cap	エースキャップ	TC6	1974	318
163	33	Desert Island Adventure	のび太漂流記	TC6	1973	220
164	33	The Undersea Adventure	潜水艦で海へ行こう	TC6	1971	111
165	33	Farewell Doraemon	さようなら、ドラえもん	TC6	1974	282
166	34	Welcome Back Doraemon	帰ってきたドラえもん	TC7	1974	286
167	34	Elf-Bots	小人ロボット	TC7	1973	207
168	34	Flying Fish	空とぶさかな	TC7	1971	99
169	34	Do You Love Me-ow?	好きでたまらニャい	TC7	1971	80
170	34	Sightseeing without Sightseeing	行かない旅行の記念写真	TC7	1972	162
171	35	The Diamond Thieves	ママのダイヤを盗み出せ	TC7	1973	221
172	35	The Disaster Detector	災難にかこまれた話	TC7	1975	342
173	35	Bomb the Mice	ネズミとばくだん	TC7	1974	322
174	35	Future Shopper	未来からの買いもの	TC7	1973	253
175	35	Habit Breaking Gas	くせなおしガス	TC7	1974	327
176	35	The Ultra Mixer	ウルトラミキサー	TC7	1972	151
177	36	The Trick-or-Tanuki Set	タヌ機	TC7	1974	299
178	36	The Eyes Have It	手足七本目が三つ（ねこの手もかりたい）	TC7	1970	74
179	36	The Charmed Rope	ピーヒョロロープ	TC7	1974	284
180	36	The Haunted Mountain Village	山奥村の怪事件	TC7	1974	285
181	36	The Psychic Cap	エスパーぼうし	TC7	1970	68
182	37	Rewinder Rag	ゆっくり反射ぞうきん	TC8	1975	358
183	37	Lighter / Writer	ライター芝居	TC8	1975	359
184	37	The Wild Watch	マッド・ウオッチ	TC8	1975	343
185	37	A Graph that Never Lies	グラフはうそつかない	TC8	1975	344
186	37	Eat Candy, Sing Dandy	キャンデーなめて歌手になろう	TC8	1973	228
187	37	Mutant Maker	人間製造機	TC8	1974	305
188	38	The Bad-Luck Diamond	悪運ダイヤ	TC8	1972	161
189	38	Laugh Long and Prosper	わらってくらそう	TC8	1975	372
190	38	Invisi-Drops	とう明人間目ぐすり	TC8	1974	320
191	38	Hugga-Pills	ニクメナイン	TC8	1975	360
192	38	The Wish-Hammer	うちでの小づち	TC8	1975	350
193	38	Moneybees	カネバチはよく働く	TC8	1975	347
194	38	The Human Locomotives	人間機関車	TC8	1975	362
195	39	The Evo-Devo Beam	進化退化放射線源	TC8	1975	365
196	39	Little Match Doraemon	マッチ売りのドラえもん	TC8	1974	335
197	39	The Snobshutter	めんくいカメラ	TC8	1975	366
198	39	The See-Scope	見たままスコープ	TC8	1974	338
199	39	Gender Bender Potion	オトコンナを飲めば?	TC8	1974	334
200	39	Eraserface	消しゴムでノッペラボー	TC8	1975	354
201	39	Today, I'm Mary!	ぼく、マリちゃんだよ	TC8	1973	222
202	39	Robo-Flattery	ロボットがほめれば...	TC8	1974	332
203	40	The Pass Loop	通りぬけフープ	TC9	1974	277
204	40	The Great "Tsuchinoko" Hunt	ツチノコ見つけた!	TC9	1975	348
205	40	Wallpaper Party	かべ紙の中で新年会	TC9	1970	77
206	40	The Play Fork	アソボウ	TC9	1975	389
207	40	The People Puppeteer	人間あやつり機	TC9	1970	63
208	40	Forget-me-lots	わすれろ草	TC9	1971	88
209	41	The Time-Delay Drops	おそだアメ	TC10	1975	392
210	41	The Urashima Candy	ウラシマキャンデー	TC9	1974	296
211	41	How to Make an Island	無人島の作り方	TC9	1975	374
212	41	The Moving Map	ひっこし地図	TC9	1975	384
213	41	The Moodometer	ごきげんメーター	TC9	1975	382
214	41	A World Full of Lies	世の中うそだらけ	TC9	1975	371
215	41	Noby's Noby	のび太ののび太	TC9	1975	376
216	42	The Ghost in the Phone	電話のおばけ	TC9	1975	377
217	42	I'm Momotaro!	ぼく、桃太郎のなんなのさ	TC9	1975	379
218	42	The Tracer Badges	トレーサーバッジ	TC9	1975	381
219	43	Gimme the Night	夜を売ります	TC10	1975	349
220	43	The XYZ-Ray Camera	XYZ線カメラ	TC10	1976	415
221	43	The Human Splitter	人間切断機	TC10	1975	403
222	43	The Underground Apartment	アパートの木	TC10	1973	212
223	43	Water to Wine	ようろうおつまみ	TC10	1975	402
224	43	The No-see-um Drops	見えなくなる目ぐすり	TC10	1975	398
225	43	The Any Day Diary	いつでも日記	TC10	1972	134
226	43	Bogus Aliens	ニセ宇宙人	TC10	1976	414
227	44	The Wishing Star	ねがい星	TC10	1970	39
228	44	The Whatever Weather Box	お天気ボックス	TC10	1971	122
229	44	The Mirage Shower	いないいないシャワー	TC10	1975	400
230	44	The Lie-DePuffer	ハリ千本ノマス	TC10	1975	352
231	44	Playing Dolls	人形あそび	TC10	1972	178
232	44	The Animal Escape Drops	動物型にげだしじょう	TC10	1975	395
233	44	Human Remote Control	人間ラジコン	TC10	1975	380
234	44	The Speed Watch	スピードどけい	TC10	1975	378
235	45	The What if? Box	もしもボックス	TC11	1975	405
236	45	The Robot Paper	ロボットペーパー	TC11	1976	428
237	45	The Houseguest Pest	いやなお客の帰し方	TC11	1973	267
238	45	Cloudwalking	雲の中の散歩	TC11	1975	410
239	45	The Werewolf Cream	おおかみ男クリーム	TC11	1975	390
240	45	The Speedwinder	ネジまいてハッスル!	TC11	1973	199
241	45	The Chum Gum	おすそわけガム	TC11	1976	431
242	46	The Disaster Driller	さいなんくんれん機	TC11	1973	247
243	46	The Legendary Sword "Denko-maru"	名刀「電光丸」	TC11	1975	341
244	46	The Bring-it-Bag	とりよせバッグ	TC11	1973	215
245	46	The Hypno-Spex	さいみんグラス	TC11	1976	434
246	46	Noby's Own TV Station	テレビ局をはじめたよ	TC11	1974	278
247	46	The Advance Antenna	あらかじめアンテナ	TC11	1976	424
248	47	Invasion of the Switcherators	からだの部品とりかえっこ	TC11	1976	425
249	47	Big G's Best Friend	ジャイアンの心の友	TC11	1976	427
250	47	True Colors	ウラオモテックス	TC12	1976	439
251	47	The Remind'ya Bird	わすれ鳥	TC12	1976	421
252	47	The Pet Look-Alike Pie	ペットそっくりまんじゅう	TC12	1976	452
253	47	The Tongue Reader	ベロ相うらない大当たり!	TC12	1975	394
254	47	The Doraemon Encyclopedia	ドラえもん大事典	TC11	1975	353
255	48	A Real Big Guy	大男がでたぞ	TC12	1976	453
256	48	The portable Thundercloud	カミナリになれよう	TC12	1976	445
257	48	The Weather Maker Chart	天気決定表	TC12	1976	458
258	48	The Insta-Ghost	ゆうれいの干物	TC12	1976	449
259	48	The Luvbrella	あいあいパラソル	TC12	1976	457
260	48	The Quickdraw Contest	けん銃王コンテスト	TC12	1975	408
261	48	The Giddyupper	はいどうたづな	TC12	1976	416
262	48	The Replay Camera	おくれカメラ	TC12	1976	423
263	49	The Grab-a-Scope	手にとり望遠鏡	TC13	1977	493
264	49	The Remora Magnet	いただき小ばん	TC13	1976	486
265	49	A World without Money	お金のいらない世界	TC13	1976	483
266	49	The Statics Suit	ちく電スーツ	TC13	1976	472
267	49	Big G's Special Stew	ジャイアンシチュー	TC13	1976	485
268	49	The Arrow to School	弓矢で学校へ	TC13	1976	480
269	49	The Fusion Glue	合体ノリ	TC13	1977	499
270	49	Turning Straw to Gold	チョージャワラシベ	TC13	1976	466
271	50	Treasure Mountain	宝さがしごっこセット	TC13	1977	502
272	50	The Magical Hands	マジックハンド	TC13	1976	470
273	50	The Space Simulator	ロケットそうじゅうくんれん機	TC13	1977	496
274	50	The Tripinator	ころばし屋	TC13	1977	497
275	50	The Back-to-Basicizer	もどりライト	TC13	1977	489
276	50	What Happens at 7:00	七時に何かがおこる	TC13	1977	490
277	50	The King of Base Stealers	盗塁王をめざせ	TC13	1976	475
278	51	The Passport to Evil	悪魔のパスポート	TC13	1976	436
279	51	The Soul Slipper	タマシイム・マシン	TC13	1976	482
280	51	The Typhoon Fan	風神さわぎ	TC13	1976	456
281	51	Shedding Like a Snake	からだの皮をはぐ話	TC14	1976	471
282	51	Ads by Mirror	かがみでコマーシャル	TC14	1977	491
283	51	The Hard Copy Paper	立体コピー	TC13	1975	383
284	52	Runaway Island	無人島へ家出	TC14	1976	488
285	52	Toy Car Training Center	ミニカー教習所	TC14	1977	519
286	52	The Moodmaker Orchestra	ムードもりあげ楽団登場!	TC14	1977	511
287	52	The Come-Here Collar	ヨンダラ首わ	TC14	1973	191
288	52	The Psychic Mic	念録マイク	TC14	1977	492
289	52	The Secret Pen	ないしょペン	TC14	1975	361
290	52	The Tall Tale Teller	ホラふきご先祖	TC14	1977	520
291	52	The Tornader	台風発生機	TC14	1974	321
292	53	The Path of Evil	悪の道を進め!	TC14	1977	495
293	53	The Man-Eating House	人喰いハウス	TC14	1977	533
294	53	Lazy Day	ぐうたらの日	TC14	1975	364
295	53	Baseball Riders	ボールに乗って	TC14	1972	174
296	53	The Alien House	宇宙人の家?	TC14	1976	469
297	53	The War in the Pond	ラジコン大海戦	TC14	1976	462
298	54	The Dreamer TV	ゆめのチャンネル	TC15	1977	531
299	54	Kitty Cat, Inc	ネコが会社を作ったよ	TC15	1977	537
300	54	The Treasure of Chinkara Pass	珍加羅峠の宝物	TC15	1973	229
301	54	The Hide-A-Room	ナイヘヤドア	TC15	1977	513
302	54	The Switch-A-Rope	入れかえロープ	TC15	1972	139
303	54	Chain Letter Club	不幸の手紙同好会	TC15	1977	503
304	54	The Infinity Pass	オールマイティーパス	TC15	1977	505
305	55	Time Crime Tracker	タイムマシンで犯人を	TC15	1971	92
306	55	The Sneaky Camera	こっそりカメラ	TC15	1973	244
307	55	The Railroad Crossing Kit	ふみきりセット	TC15	1977	521
308	55	The Do-Over Device	人生やりなおし機	TC15	1977	504
309	55	The Rank Patches	階級ワッペン	TC15	1977	506
310	55	The Graffiti Gun	らくがきじゅう	TC15	1974	301
311	55	The Expresso Machine	表情コントローラー	TC15	1974	298
312	56	The Time Bank	時間貯金箱	TC16	1977	508
313	56	Canned Noise	騒音公害をカンヅメにしちゃえ	TC15	1976	437
314	56	It's a Cat's Cradle World	あやとり世界	TC15	1977	510
315	56	The Season Selector	オールシーズンバッジ	TC16	1977	545
316	56	Best Dad Ever!	りっぱなパパになるぞ!	TC16	1977	498
317	56	I Hate Money!	お金なんか大きらい!	TC16	1971	130
318	57	The Talkspray	モノモース	TC16	1978	578
319	57	The Deluxifier	デラックスライト	TC16	1977	553
320	57	The Walksleeper	立ちユメぼう	TC16	1977	562
321	57	The Four-Dimensional Pocket	四次元ポケット	TC16	1977	515
322	57	The Infinity Lasso	ナゲーなげなわ	TC16	1977	500
323	57	The Jack-in-the-Whatever	びっくり箱ステッキ	TC16	1977	548
324	57	The Leaflector	ドロン葉	TC16	1978	570
325	58	The Ultra Armor	ウルトラよろい	TC16	1977	534
326	58	The Singer/Songwriter	シンガーソングライター	TC16	1977	540
327	58	The Dinky Derby	いっすんぼうし	TC16	1976	461
328	58	The Sahara's No Place to Study	サハラ砂漠で勉強はできない	TC16	1977	532
329	58	Clouds and Crafts	雲ざいくで遊ぼう	TC16	1977	527
330	58	The Future Diary	あらかじめ日記はおそろしい	TC16	1977	541
331	58	King of the Space	宇宙ターザン	TC16	1978	605
332	59	Adrift in Time	大むかし漂流記	TC17	1977	524
333	59	The Make-You-Sweatpants	ムリヤリトレパン	TC17	1978	601
334	59	Take Care in the Air	空で遊んじゃあぶないよ	TC17	1978	598
335	59	The Buck-Passing Glove	タッチ手ぶくろ	TC17	1977	525
336	59	The Starring Roller	主役はめこみ機	TC17	1978	587
337	60	Moving Day	あちこちひっこそう	TC17	1977	543
338	60	The Cover-Up Spray	かたづけラッカー	TC17	1976	487
339	60	Personal Satellites	自家用衛星	TC17	1977	564
340	60	The House-Robo	家がロボットになった	TC17	1977	555
341	60	First Come, First Reserved	ドラやき・映画・予約ずみ	TC17	1978	568
342	61	Noby's Personal Theater	のび太の部屋でロードショー	TC18	1978	595
343	61	The Thrill Boomerang	スリルブーメラン	TC18	1979	666
344	61	The Favori-Tree	ひい木	TC18	1978	607
345	61	The Spy Satellites	スパイ衛星でさぐれ	TC18	1979	680
346	61	The Room Swimmer	ルームスイマー	TC18	1978	599
347	61	The Little House in the Glacier	大氷山の小さな家	TC18	1978	612
348	61	The Reverse ESP Nuts	テレパしい	TC18	1978	617
349	61	Vroom Vroom Vacuum	ドライブはそうじ機に乗って	TC18	1978	574
350	62	The Automstic Pawnshop	自動質屋機	TC18	1979	655
351	62	The Virtuality Cap	実感帽	TC18	1977	518
352	62	The Daruma Doll	あの日あの時あのダルマ	TC18	1978	576
353	62	The Yes-M'Lord Drops	コーモンじょう	TC18	1978	593
354	62	The Sandman Sleeps at Night	ねむれぬ夜に砂男	TC18	1978	629
355	62	The Dandelion's Journey	タンポポ空を行く	TC18	1979	673
356	63	The Home Exerciser	アスレチック・ハウス	TC19	1978	619
357	63	The Crowd-be-Gone Gyro	人よけジャイロ	TC19	1979	682
358	63	Strolling on the Seabed	海に入らず海底を散歩する方法	TC19	1978	606
359	63	Space Wars in the Attic	天井うらの宇宙戦争	TC19	1978	610
360	63	The Couple Tester Badges	カップルテストバッジ	TC19	1979	649
361	63	The All-In-One Appliance	オコノミボックス	TC19	1978	640
362	64	The Stickerbot Rebellion	ロボッターの反乱	TC19	1977	546
363	64	Noby's Secret Tunnels	のび太の秘密トンネル	TC19	1978	630
364	64	The Delivery Phone	出前電話	TC19	1978	623
365	64	The Shadow Catcher	影とりプロジェクター	TC19	1979	720
366	64	The Bug Pellets	無敵コンチュー丹	TC19	1978	586
367	64	Santa's Chimney	サンタえんとつ	TC19	1977	561
368	65	The Blueprint Paper	設計紙で秘密基地を!	TC20	1979	724
369	65	Rich Dad, Poor Dad	ふくびんコンビ	TC20	1979	671
370	65	The Doc-in-a-Box	お医者さんカバン	TC20	1979	642
371	65	The Samaritan Snaps	ぼくをタスケロン	TC20	1979	690
372	65	Noby's Window	あの窓にさようなら	TC19	1978	622
373	66	Paradise Indoors	へやの中の大自然	TC20	1977	526
374	66	The Medusa Head	ゴルゴンの首	TC20	1979	683
375	66	The 3D Pinhole Camera	実物立体日光写真	TC20	1978	639
376	66	A Night on the Galactic Railwaw	天の川鉄道の夜	TC20	1980	731
377	66	The Pick-a-Door	プッシュドア	TC20	1978	611
378	66	The Dream Blaster	ツモリガン	TC20	1979	715
379	67	The Good Luck Droops	アヤカリンで幸運を	TC20	1980	776
380	67	The Dorayaki as Big as the Ritz	へやいっぱいの大ドラやき	TC20	1978	638
381	67	Free Money	出てくる出てくるお年玉	TC20	1978	636
382	67	The Balance Shot	バランス注射	TC20	1975	409
383	67	Games in Spase	宇宙探検すごろく	TC20	1979	647
384	67	The Heart-to-Heart Drops	ココロコロン	TC20	1979	709
385	67	A Snowcapped Romance	雪山のロマンス	TC20	1978	618
386	68	SnowlessSkiing	雪がなくてもスキーはできる	TC21	1980	742
387	68	Japan Expands	ひろびろ日本	TC21	1980	738
388	68	The Multi-Purpose Charm	多目的おまもりは責任感が強い	TC21	1979	706
389	68	Real Dinosaurs!?	恐竜が出た!?	TC21	1979	677
390	68	Alone in the Future	未来の町にただ一人	TC21	1979	674
391	69	Big Boss Noby	いばり屋のび太	TC21	1979	691
392	69	The Vampire Kit	ドラキュラセット	TC21	1979	711
393	69	The Happy Promenade	ハッピープロムナード	TC21	1980	733
394	69	Summer Doll House	ミニハウスでさわやかな夏	TC21	1979	684
395	69	The Long-Distance Mom Drops	ママをたずねて三千キロじょう	TC21	1980	737
396	70	The Move Mimicker	まねコン	TC21	1979	717
397	70	The Santa Stationery	サンタメール	TC21	1979	712
398	70	The Sprite Summoner	精霊よびだしうでわ	TC21	1980	735
399	70	The Mind Camera	念写カメラマン	TC21	1979	670
400	71	The Gamechanger Camera	カチカチカメラ	TC22	1980	781
401	71	The Discipline Drops	しつけキャンディー	TC22	1979	662
402	71	Getting Hurt without Getting Hurt	無事故でけがをした話	TC22	1977	563
403	71	Little G's Boyfriend...Noby!?	ジャイ子の恋人=のび太	TC22	1980	727
404	71	The R/C Run-Around	ラジコンシミュレーターでぶっとばせ	TC22	1979	656
405	71	Noby's Rescue Party	のび太救出決死探検隊	TC22	1980	799
406	72	The Blue Bird of Happiness	しあわせをよぶ青い鳥	TC22	1979	707
407	72	The Long-Distance Mirror	うつしっぱなしミラー	TC22	1980	798
408	72	The Pretendax	オモイコミン	TC22	1979	714
409	72	The Hot Spring Rope	温泉ロープでいい湯だな	TC22	1980	784
410	72	A Home for "Ruff"	のら犬「イチ」の国	TC22	1980	786
411	73	The People Player	本人ビデオ	TC23	1980	797
412	73	The Great Letter-ature Pen	もはん手紙ペン	TC23	1979	713
413	73	The Rope of Justice	おそるべき正義ロープ	TC23	1980	750
414	73	The Mall Mallet	うちでのデパート	TC23	1980	803
415	73	Happy Birthday, Big G!	ハッピーバースデイ・ジャイアン	TC23	1980	756
416	74	The Indoor Aquarium	おざしき水族館	TC23	1980	766
417	74	The Cheerleader Gloves	勝利をよぶチアガール手ぶくろ	TC23	1980	770
418	74	The Water Sculpture Sprinkles	水加工用ふりかけ	TC23	1980	783
419	74	The See-Through Stickers	透視シールで大ピンチ	TC23	1980	779
420	75	The Fringe Theory Club Badges	異説クラブメンバーズバッジ	TC23	1980	791
421	75	The Wakey Waker	オキテテヨカッタ	TC23	1980	801
422	75	The Holy Hanky	ぼくのまもり紙	TC23	1980	757
423	75	The Long New Year	長い長いお正月	TC23	1979	721
424	76	Noby's Helicopter	のび太のヘリコプター	TC24	1980	802
425	76	The Second Girlfriend	虹谷ユメ子さん	TC24	1981	828
426	76	The Fire Prevention Alarm	火災予定報知ベル	TC24	1981	841
427	76	20th Century Shogun	二十世紀のおとのさま	TC24	1980	759
428	76	The Territory Marker	ナワバリエキス	TC24	1979	719
429	76	The Candy Ranch	おかし牧場	TC24	1977	530
430	77	Go, Time, Go!	時間よ動け～っ!!	TC24	1979	693
431	77	The Instant Delivery Machine	忘れ物おくりとどけ機	TC24	1978	627
432	77	The Sinker Balls	しずめ玉でスッキリ	TC24	1981	818
433	77	The Folding House	おりたたみハウス	TC24	1979	723
434	77	Little G the Comic Artist	まんが家ジャイ子	TC24	1980	804
435	77	The Personal Limelight	めだちライトで人気者	TC24	1980	741
436	77	Animation Made Easy	アニメ制作なんてわけないよ	TC24	1980	755
437	78	The Six-Sided Camera	六面カメラ	TC24	1981	847
438	78	Addicted to Big G	ジャイアンリサイタルを楽しむ方法	TC24	1980	800
439	78	Wild Wold Noby	ガンファイターのび太	TC24	1980	740
440	78	Doraemon's Rough Patch	ションボリ、ドラえもん	TC24	1981	829
441	79	Home Away from Noby	のび太のなが～い家出	TC25	1981	830
442	79	The Moneypencil	円ピツで大金持ち	TC25	1981	833
443	79	The Spare 4D Pocket	四次元ポケットにスペアがあったのだ	TC25	1981	870
444	79	Noby's Space Shuttle	のび太のスペースシャトル	TC25	1981	844
445	79	Happy Tummy Gas	ヘソリンガスでしあわせに	TC25	1979	703
446	80	Noby Gets an "A"!	な、なんと!! のび太が百点とった!!	TC25	1981	836
447	80	The Material Converter	材質変換機	TC25	1980	732
448	80	Comics in a Can	カンヅメカンでまんがを	TC25	1979	698
449	80	The Friendcense	なかまいりせんこう	TC25	1980	790
450	80	The Peace Antenna	平和アンテナ	TC25	1981	840
451	80	An Ants' Life	羽アリのゆくえ	TC25	1981	835
452	81	The Indoor Express	ブルートレインはぼくの家	TC25	1978	608
453	81	8 Days at the Dragon King's Palace	竜宮城の八日間	TC25	1980	767
454	81	Tomorrow's News Today	あしたの新聞	TC25	1981	848
455	81	The Night before Noby's Wedding	のび太の結婚前夜	TC25	1981	857
456	82	The TV Grabber	テレビとりもち	TC26	1981	883
457	82	The Quakefish	地震なまず	TC26	1980	806
458	82	The Flag of Truth	「真実の旗印」はつねに正しい	TC26	1980	807
459	82	Riding a Unicorn	ユニコーンにのった	TC26	1981	890
460	82	The Puddle Spray	どんぶらガス	TC26	1980	765
461	82	The Shellfish Submarine	アワビとり潜水艦出航	TC26	1981	866
462	82	The Equalizer	ビョードーばくだん	TC26	1980	778
463	83	Shizuka the Friendly Witch	魔女っ子しずちゃん	TC26	1981	862
464	83	The Heavy-Light	おもかるとう	TC26	1981	845
465	83	The Parachute Race	ぼうけんパラシュート	TC26	1979	722
466	83	Air around the World	空気中継衛星	TC26	1981	887
467	83	The Living Forest	森は生きている	TC26	1980	811
468	83	What the Water Saw	水は見ていた	TC26	1981	880
469	84	Walking to the Moon	歩け歩け月までも	TC26	1981	827
470	84	Black Hole Noby	のび太のブラックホール	TC26	1981	813
471	84	The Snow Filters	雪アダプターいろいろあるよ	TC26	1979	718
472	84	Noby's Underground Empire	のび太の地底国	TC26	1980	726
473	84	The Time Capsule	タイムカプセル	TC26	1981	878
474	85	The 4D Expansion Blocks	四次元たてましブロック	TC27	1982	908
475	85	Noby the Trainer	のび太の調教師	TC27	1981	872
476	85	Doraemon in Love	恋するドラえもん	TC27	1982	914
477	85	The Cuckoo Egg	カッコータマゴ	TC27	1982	934
478	85	The Dividing Hammer	分身ハンマー	TC27	1980	764
479	85	The Bug Riders	コンチュウ飛行機にのろう	TC27	1981	858
480	85	A Ropey Friend	細く長い友だち	TC27	1981	869
481	86	The Time Scope	きりかえ式タイムスコープ	TC27	1979	667
482	86	The No-Zone Signs	キンシひょうしき	TC27	1981	822
483	86	The Real-Time Maproscope	ポラマップスコープとポラマップ地図	TC27	1981	834
484	86	The Human Book Cover	人間ブックカバー	TC27	1982	915
485	86	The Aptitude Armband	職業テスト腕章	TC27	1981	826
486	86	The Real Life Video Game	本物電子ゲーム	TC27	1982	920
487	86	Endangered Species Noby	のび太は世界にただ一匹	TC27	1981	819
488	87	Whatever-phobia	○□恐怖症	TC27	1981	894
489	87	Hush, Little Big G	ジャイアンよい子だねんねしな	TC27	1981	815
490	87	A World without Mirrors	かがみのない世界	TC27	1981	825
491	87	The Time-Delayed Psychic	10分おくれのエスパー	TC27	1982	899
492	87	The Lucky Cards	しあわせトランプの恐怖	TC27	1982	907
493	88	The Word-Change Capsules	しりとり変身カプセル	TC28	1983	989
494	88	The Horizon Tape	地平線テープ	TC28	1982	928
495	88	The Bro Badges	兄弟シール	TC28	1978	573
496	88	The Name-Changer	いれかえ表札	TC28	1982	919
497	88	1 Push=100 Yen	ポカリ=百円	TC28	1980	753
498	88	Discovering a New Species	新種図鑑で有名になろう	TC28	1982	913
499	88	Shizuka's Secret	しずちゃんの心の秘密	TC28	1982	956
500	89	The Ninja Training Kit	ニンニン修業セット	TC28	1982	926
501	89	The Dream Ladder	夢はしご	TC28	1982	906
502	89	The Automatic Theater	なぜか劇がメチャクチャに	TC28	1981	877
503	89	Sneech's Secret	大ピンチ!スネ夫の答案	TC28	1982	950
504	89	The Master Board	家元かんばん	TC28	1982	927
505	89	Noby Airlines	のび太航空	TC28	1982	949
506	90	The Hermit Bot	神さまロボットに愛の手を!	TC28	1981	865
507	90	The Merchandise Maker	キャラクター商品注文機	TC28	1982	953
508	90	The Life-Size Model Island	百丈島の原寸大プラモ	TC28	1982	933
509	90	The Pearl Maker Shell	しんじゅ製造アコヤケース	TC28	1982	964
510	91	The Peephole Board	のぞき穴ボード	TC29	1983	1047
511	91	The Machine Copy Machine	機械化機	TC29	1982	922
512	91	Instant Robots	インスタントロボット	TC29	1982	939
513	91	Space Explorers	宇宙探検ごっこ	TC29	1982	965
514	91	Life as a Ghost	ユーレイ暮らしはやめられない	TC29	1982	970
515	91	The Gread Model Escape	プラモが大脱走	TC29	1982	921
516	92	Big G's Big Romance	グンニャリジャイアン	TC29	1981	854
517	92	The Buyback-Bot	自動買いとり機	TC29	1983	1017
518	92	The Insta-Freeze Camera	あいつを固めちゃえ	TC29	1982	946
519	92	Space Swimming	広～い宇宙で海水浴	TC29	1982	943
520	92	The Monster Bunnies	うら山のウサギ怪獣	TC29	1981	864
521	92	First Time Fun	思いだせ! あの日の感動	TC29	1982	942
522	93	The Flying Carpet Cloth	空飛ぶうす手じゅうたん	TC29	1982	962
523	93	The Flat Iron	ペタンコアイロン	TC29	1982	904
524	93	The Noby Swallow	ツバメののび太	TC29	1981	879
525	93	Tsubasa's Big Visit	翼ちゃんがうちへきた	TC29	1982	932
526	93	Little G, Pro Cartoonist	まんが家ジャイ子先生	TC29	1982	967
527	94	The Mini-Pedia	実物ミニチュア大百科	TC30	1982	978
528	94	Celebrity Bodyprints	人気スターがまっ黒け	TC30	1982	976
529	94	The Sandlot Shark	空き地のジョーズ	TC30	1983	1041
530	94	The Booster Bank	フエール銀行	TC30	1982	975
531	94	The King of Sleep	ねむりの天才のび太	TC30	1982	918
532	94	The Midnight Caller	真夜中の電話魔	TC30	1983	1004
533	95	The Wild Pet House	野生ペット小屋	TC30	1982	981
534	95	Blue Screen Nobyman	クロマキーでノビちゃんマン	TC30	1983	985
535	95	Big G's Big Debut	ジャイアンテレビにでる!	TC30	1982	974
536	95	The Happy Cap	ホンワカキャップ	TC30	1983	1039
537	95	The Reunion Briefcase	ひさしぶりトランク	TC30	1982	912
538	95	The Room Switcher Switch	へやこうかんスイッチ	TC30	1983	1008
539	96	The Little-Later Lens	することレンズ	TC30	1983	1035
540	96	The Junior Hang-Glider	お子さまハンググライダー	TC30	1983	1026
541	96	The Good Old Days	昔はよかった	TC30	1981	850
542	96	The Invention Inventor	ハツメイカーで大発明	TC30	1981	873
543	97	The Time Valve	時門で長～～い一日	TC31	1981	851
544	97	Catching a Sea Monster	海坊主がつれた!	TC32	1983	1020
545	97	The Mess of Monsters	つめあわせオバケ	TC31	1980	777
546	97	Sneech the Psychic	エスパースネ夫	TC31	1980	763
547	97	Welcome, Dinosaurs!	恐竜さん日本へどうぞ	TC31	1981	856
548	98	The Sea-Parting Staff	モーゼステッキ	TC31	1983	1014
549	98	Good House, Bad House	よい家悪い家	TC31	1979	643
550	98	The Experience Recoder	録験機で楽しもう	TC31	1979	676
551	98	Home is Where the Tree is	やどり木で楽しく家出	TC31	1981	843
552	98	The After-the Fact Album	あとからアルバム	TC31	1983	1027
553	98	Pants of the Jungle	ターザンパンツ	TC31	1981	888
554	98	The Thread that Binds	むすびの糸	TC31	1981	885
555	99	The Personal Shield System	バリヤーポイント	TC31	1982	971
556	99	The Wallpaper Scenery Changer	かべ景色きりかえ機	TC31	1983	999
557	99	The Next Chapter	まんがのつづき	TC31	1982	925
558	99	Custom Toy Cars	改造チョコQ	TC31	1982	969
559	99	Parting is Sweet Sorrow	ためしにさようなら	TC31	1983	988
560	100	Into the Silver Screen	巨大立体スクリーンの中へ	TC32	1984	1065
561	100	Noby the Genius	のび太も天才になれる?	TC32	1982	968
562	100	The Lost-and-Found Fishing Pond	落とし物つりぼり	TC32	1982	898
563	100	The Hotel Fixer-Uppers	オンボロ旅館をたて直せ	TC32	1980	748
564	100	The War of the Dioramas	超リアル・ジオラマ作戦	TC32	1983	1052
565	100	The Real Life Remote	ビデオ式なんでもリモコン	TC32	1983	995
566	101	The Featherweight Plane	フェザープレーン	TC32	1982	910
567	101	The Zero-Gravity House	野比家が無重力	TC32	1978	616
568	101	The Anything Airport	なんでも空港	TC32	1981	867
569	101	The World Time Clock	時差時計	TC32	1983	1015
570	101	Sneech's Missing Butt	スネ夫のおしりがゆくえ不明	TC32	1982	951
571	101	Noby-rella	のび太シンデレラ	TC32	1981	860
572	101	Noby Gets Rich	大富豪のび太	TC32	1981	849
573	102	The Desire Detector	ほしい人探知機	TC32	1982	948
574	102	The Smooth-Talking Ventrilo-Bot	腹話ロボット	TC31	1981	876
575	102	Delicious Reading	本はおいしくよもう	TC32	1983	983
576	102	The Associative Deduction Magnifying Glass	連想式推理虫メガネ	TC32	1982	905
577	102	Goodbye, Shizuka	しずちゃんさようなら	TC32	1980	793
578	103	The Noby Poster	ポスターになったのび太	TC33	1981	837
579	103	Big G's Fan Club	フィーバー!! ジャイアンF・C	TC33	1982	963
580	103	The Dry Light Empire	地底のドライ・ライト	TC33	1981	897
581	103	The Roll Anywhere Skates	どこでもだれでもローラースケート	TC33	1983	1006
582	103	The Routine Rerouter	あの道この道楽な道	TC33	1981	871
583	103	The Grown-Up Scolding Pass	大人をしかる腕章	TC33	1980	785
584	103	The Future Camera	ユクスエカメラ	TC33	1980	768
585	104	The Boy in the Mirror	鏡の中の世界	TC33	1982	929
586	104	Everything in Its Place	横取りジャイアンをこらしめよう	TC33	1982	947
587	104	Halley's Tail	ハリーのしっぽ	TC33	1984	1088
588	104	The Liqi-Vape Drops	サンタイン	TC33	1982	936
589	104	The Get Started Pistol	すぐやるガン	TC33	1980	751
590	105	The Personal Fuse	いやになったらヒューズをとばせ	TC33	1982	955
591	105	The Freight Train Fedora	SLえんとつ	TC33	1983	998
592	105	The Winnining Postcard	だせば当たる!! けん賞用ハガキ	TC33	1981	891
593	105	Enter the Studyman	ガッコー仮面登場	TC33	1984	1069
594	105	Farewell, Mon Arbor	さらばキー坊	TC33	1984	1068
595	106	The Arctic Extract	エスキモー・エキス	TC34	1983	1023
596	106	The Rubberneck Racer	ヤジウマアンテナ	TC34	1983	1045
597	106	Enter the Owlman	フクロマンスーツ	TC34	1980	739
598	106	Art Assist	みたままベレーで天才画家	TC34	1979	700
599	106	Magic Handkerchief	タネなしマジック	TC34	1983	1033
600	107	The Strange Persimmon Tree	一晩でカキの実がなった	TC34	1983	1040
601	107	How Time Flies	「時」はゴウゴウと流れる	TC34	1983	1005
602	107	Rain Man Blue	雨男はつらいよ	TC34	1984	1057
603	107	The Auto-Returner Tag	自動返送荷札	TC34	1984	1105
604	107	The Soul Control Gun	たましいふきこみ銃	TC34	1983	1003
605	107	The Wish Card	シテクレジットカード	TC34	1984	1117
606	108	The Transformade	変身・変身・また変身	TC34	1982	960
607	108	Noby's Dilemma	のび太もたまには考える	TC34	1983	991
608	108	Earthquake Training Paper	地震訓練ペーパー	TC34	1984	1083
609	108	Nopper's paradise	ひるねは天国で	TC34	1983	1044
610	108	Big Fish, Little Pond	水たまりのピラルク	TC34	1981	892
611	109	The Massage Cannon	大砲でないしょの話	TC35	1984	1077
612	109	The Talk'n Typewriter	ききがきタイプライター	TC35	1984	1115
613	109	Echoes in the Night	ま夜中に山びこ山が!	TC35	1983	1050
614	109	The Lazy New Year Kit	ぐ～たらお正月セット	TC35	1984	1125
615	109	The Slope Switch	さか道レバー	TC35	1979	716
616	109	Copy-Doodle-Doo	レプリコッコ	TC35	1982	966
617	109	Noby's Do-Over	空ぶりは巻きもどして...	TC35	1984	1070
618	110	The Forced Cash Card	ムリヤリキャッシュカード	TC35	1984	1081
619	110	Sweet Home Shizuka	しずちゃんとスイートホーム	TC35	1983	984
620	110	Stop the World, I Want to Get Off	地球下車マシン	TC35	1984	1058
621	110	Big G's Fan Mail	ジャイアンへのホットなレター	TC35	1983	1046
622	110	The Animal Payback Drops	動物変身恩返しグスリ	TC35	1983	1021
623	110	Doraemon's Day Off	ドラえもんに休日を!!	TC35	1984	1100
624	110	The Cray-Bot	ネンドロイド	TC35	1984	1097
625	111	The Plushie Maker	なんでもぬいぐるみに...	TC35	1984	1093
626	111	Wind-Up Subterrine	ゼンマイ式潜地艦	TC35	1983	1016
627	111	Meanie Juice	悪魔のイジワール	TC35	1983	1029
628	111	Hurricane Big G	ジャイアン台風接近中	TC35	1984	1101
629	111	Hoy's Village	ドンジャラ村のホイ	TC35	1984	1092
630	112	The Charter Chip	貸し切りチップ	TC36	1983	1011
631	112	Opposite Dreamers	サカユメンでいい夢みよう	TC36	1981	886
632	112	Gulliver's Troubles	めいわくガリバー	TC36	1983	1034
633	112	The Copycan	「そんざいかん」がのぞいてる	TC36	1984	1111
634	112	Dorama Spray	もりあがれ!ドラマチックガス	TC36	1984	1107
635	112	The Mind Tuning Fork	ツモリナール	TC36	1984	1118
636	112	Gentle Big G	ジャイアン反省・のび太はめいわく	TC36	1984	1106
637	113	Please Forgive–Bee	シズメバチの巣	TC36	1984	1120
638	113	The Time Peephole	タイムふしあな	TC36	1984	1102
639	113	The Prophecy	大予言・地球の滅びる日	TC36	1984	1087
640	113	Advernture Tea Time	アドベン茶で大冒険	TC36	1984	1094
641	113	Playing God	神さまごっこ	TC36	1982	935
642	113	The Prank Maker	いたずらオモチャ化機	TC36	1984	1096
643	113	The Ghost Timer	オバケタイマー	TC36	1985	1154
644	114	Noby's Son Runs Away	のび太の息子が家出した	TC36	1984	1064
645	114	The Cross-Section Viewer	断層ビジョン	TC36	1985	1129
646	114	Booze River	酒の泳ぐ川	TC36	1984	1056
647	114	The Woodcutter's Pond	きこりの泉	TC36	1984	1122
648	114	The Skypoke Statue	天つき地蔵	TC36	1982	961
649	115	The Magic-Pedia	魔法事典	TC37	1982	930
650	115	The Ultra Handyman Company	なんでもひきうけ会社	TC37	1984	1113
651	115	The Feelie Fez	感覚モニター	TC37	1984	1074
652	115	The Robot Guardian Angel	ロボット背後霊	TC37	1984	1062
653	115	The Elevator Plate	エレベーター・プレート	TC37	1985	1144
654	115	The Doubt Transmitter	自信ぐらつ機	TC37	1984	1112
655	115	The Gift-Kerchief	おみやげフロシキ	TC37	1981	824
656	116	The Lift Stick	リフトストック	TC37	1985	1184
657	116	The Whammy Cam	ドッキリビデオ	TC37	1984	1082
658	116	The Truth-Be-Told Speaker	アトカラホントスピーカー	TC37	1985	1183
659	116	Noby's Rock-Hound	かわいい石ころの話	TC37	1980	729
660	116	Kaguya-Bot	かぐやロボット	TC37	1983	1010
661	116	Come-Here Chow	カムカムキャットフード	TC37	1984	1108
662	116	The Ventrilophone	ふきかえ糸電話	TC37	1985	1157
663	117	Imprinting Shizuka	たまごの中のしずちゃん	TC37	1984	1123
664	117	Escape from Score Zero	のび太の0点脱出作戦	TC37	1985	1160
665	117	Clone Juice	クローンリキッドごくう	TC37	1982	952
666	117	Real Ghost!	しかしユーレイはでた!	TC37	1982	941
667	117	Christine Goda, Comis Artist	大人気!クリスチーネ先生	TC37	1985	1167
668	118	Twinkle Twinkle	夜空がギンギラギン	TC38	1986	1202
669	118	Big G's Big Concert	またもジャイアンコンサート	TC38	1984	1080
670	118	A Clock is Hatched	時計はタマゴからかえる	TC38	1981	838
671	118	The Dreamplayer	ドリームプレイヤー	TC38	1984	1124
672	118	Rest for the Wicked	じゃま者をねむらせろ	TC38	1981	882
673	118	The Transmogrify Ray	物体変換銃	TC38	1985	1142
674	118	Revenge Vouchers	しかえし伝票	TC38	1985	1138
675	119	The Circle of Friends	友だちの輪	TC38	1984	1095
676	119	The Liar Matcher	どっちがウソか! アワセール	TC38	1980	761
677	119	The Safety Charm Sticker	ききめ一番やくよけシール	TC38	1984	1089
678	119	The Hypno-Pillowcase	ねながらケース	TC38	1985	1168
679	119	The Adventure Game Book	冒険ゲームブック	TC38	1985	1159
680	119	The Plantain Fan	バショー扇の使いみち	TC38	1985	1156
681	119	The Pickup Rod	かるがるつりざお	TC38	1982	917
682	120	The Mushroom Miniscape	箱庭で松たけがり	TC38	1984	1114
683	120	The All Alone-ade	無人境ドリンク	TC38	1985	1191
684	120	The Stone Age Hotel	石器時代のホテル	TC38	1982	957
685	120	The Shine Solidifier	カチンカチンライト	TC38	1985	1147
686	120	The Invincible Cannon	スネ夫の無敵砲台	TC38	1985	1179
687	121	Fairytale Land Tickets	メルヘンランド入場券	TC39	1986	1215
688	121	Noby Plays God	のび太 神さまになる	TC39	1983	996
689	121	The Memory Disc	メモリーディスク	TC39	1983	1009
690	121	The Handi-Cap	ハンディキャップ	TC39	1986	1219
691	121	The Ten Rules of the Rock	十戒石板	TC39	1983	997
692	121	The Deflation Needle	厚みぬきとりバリ	TC39	1986	1226
693	121	Shoe Riders	乗りものぐつでドライブ	TC39	1982	916
694	122	Just the Truth	ジャストホンネ	TC39	1985	1130
695	122	Handmade Clouds	手作りの雲は楽しいね	TC39	1984	1126
696	122	The Secret Tunnel Pen	ぬけ穴ボールペン	TC39	1986	1201
697	122	The Mind-Whisper	さとりヘルメット	TC39	1985	1172
698	122	Balloon Express Mail	風船がとどけた手紙	TC39	1986	1220
699	122	The Slider Stick	ずらしんぼ	TC39	1986	1208
700	122	The 4D Junior Driver Sticker	四次元若葉マーク	TC39	1986	1210
701	123	Cushions Have Feelings, Too	ざぶとんにもたましいがある	TC39	1983	982
702	123	The Case of the Killer Song	ジャイアン殺人事件	TC39	1985	1131
703	123	Noby's Train Set	のび太の模型鉄道	TC39	1986	1240
704	123	The Castaway Set	ロビンソンクルーソーセット	TC39	1983	1002
705	123	A Clockwork Typhoon	ねじ式台風	TC39	1982	959
706	123	The Idiomator	具象化鏡	TC39	1986	1209
707	123	Rainbow Violetta	虹のビオレッタ	TC39	1988	1258
708	124	The Personal Nation Kit	おこのみ建国用品いろいろ	TC40	1989	1276
709	124	Mr.S Returns	またまた先生がくる	TC40	1988	1256
710	124	The Buck Passer	あとはおまかせタッチ手ぶくろ	TC40	1983	1028
711	124	Terror Tonic	恐怖のたたりチンキ	TC40	1985	1166
712	124	Fictional Character Eggs	架空人物たまご	TC40	1985	1165
713	124	Looks, Power, or IQ	顔か力かIQか	TC40	1988	1259
714	124	Big G's Decision	ふつうの男の子にもどらない	TC40	1985	1148
715	125	The Reporter Robot	レポーターロボット	TC40	1985	1143
716	125	The Free-Size Costume Camera	フリーサイズぬいぐるみカメラ	TC40	1989	1265
717	125	The Typhoon Trap and the Wind Fridge	台風トラップと風蔵庫	TC40	1983	1032
718	125	Home Nature Theater	環境スクリーンで勉強バリバリ	TC40	1989	1264
719	125	The Blind Spot Star	モーテン星	TC40	1985	1153
720	125	The Time Room	タイム・ルーム 昔のカキの物語	TC40	1988	1254
721	126	The Perfect Sneech	スネ夫は理想のお兄さん	TC40	1984	1099
722	126	The Mini Hot Air Balloon	ミニ熱気球	TC40	1989	1267
723	126	The Human Piggy Bank Maker	人間貯金箱製造機	TC40	1989	1263
724	126	Flying Comics	空とぶマンガ本	TC40	1989	1269
725	126	Little G's Big Crush	泣くなジャイ子よ	TC40	1989	1266
726	126	Winning Back Shizuka	しずちゃんをとりもどせ	TC40	1989	1270
727	127	Left, Straight, Right, Right, Left...	左、直、右、右、左...	TC41	1990	1294
728	127	The Invisible Bodyguard	みえないボディガード	TC41	1985	1155
729	127	The Pied Pipertron	ハメルンチャルメラ	TC41	1984	1072
730	127	The Future Library Card	未来図書券	TC41	1989	1285
731	127	Keep-It-Up Gloves	つづきをヨロシク	TC41	1989	1271
732	127	Mini-Doraemon	ぼくミニドラえもん	TC41	1987	1245
733	127	The Remote Eyelips	出ちょう口目	TC41	1985	1150
734	128	Real Magic	マジックの使い道	TC41	1989	1284
735	128	A 30-Story House	野比家は三十階	TC41	1989	1277
736	128	The Time-Dumb	時限バカ弾	TC41	1985	1162
737	128	International Bug Hunters	世界の昆虫を集めよう	TC41	1986	1231
738	128	Retune to Owner Spray	落としものカムバックスプレー	TC41	1989	1278
739	128	The Omni-Sketchbook	いつでもどこでもスケッチセット	TC41	1989	1272
740	129	The Dinner Show of Terror	恐怖のディナーショー	TC41	1989	1275
741	129	The Any Day Calendar	気まぐれカレンダー	TC41	1989	1273
742	129	The Weighter-Unweighter	ふんわりズッシリメーター	TC41	1989	1288
743	129	The Neighborhood under the Sea	深夜の町は海の底	TC41	1990	1296
744	129	Monster Island	無人島の大怪物	TC41	1981	863
745	130	The Great Escape	町内突破大作戦	TC42	1990	1299
746	130	The Abstainer's Shrine	断ち物願かけ神社	TC42	1989	1261
747	130	The Scene Stealer	けしきカッター	TC42	1986	1207
748	130	A Feast for the Eyes	目は口ほどに物を食べ	TC42	1990	1306
749	130	Mine All Mine Spray	あなただけの物ガス	TC42	1989	1287
750	130	The Hide-and-Stick	かくれん棒	TC42	1987	1249
751	131	Digging for Clam-Packs	もぐれ! ハマグリパック	TC42	1990	1307
752	131	The Whatsit Tabs	ツーカー錠	TC42	1987	1244
753	131	The Ultra-Eraser	万能クリーナー	TC42	1990	1295
754	131	The Paper Submarine	深海潜水艇たった二百円!!	TC42	1989	1289
755	131	The Nervous System Controller	運動神経コントローラー	TC42	1983	1022
756	131	Half and Half and Half and...	半分の半分のまた半分...	TC42	1989	1279
757	131	The Mini-Car Set	実用ミニカーセット	TC42	1986	1232
758	132	Boy Becomes Girl	男女入れかえ物語	TC42	1985	1161
759	132	The Wish Granter	やりすぎ! のぞみ実現機	TC42	1989	1281
760	132	The Emotional Energy Tank	感情エネルギーボンベ	TC42	1985	1177
761	132	Noby Gets Jealous	ふたりっきりでなにしてる?	TC42	1989	1282
762	132	The Course Checker	右か左か人生コース	TC42	1985	1137
763	132	The Universal Encyclopedia	宇宙完全大百科	TC42	1990	1303
764	133	Noby the Cat	ネコののび太いりませんか	TC43	1990	1300
765	133	Perfect Pictures	万能プリンター	TC43	1990	1314
766	133	The Time Adjustin' Acorn	上げ下げくり	TC43	1985	1135
767	133	The Charter Phone	かしきり電話	TC43	1980	794
768	133	The Copybrain	コピー頭脳でラクしよう	TC43	1982	900
769	133	Resolve and Determination	男は決心!	TC43	1982	977
770	134	The Weather Concentrator	まわりのお天気集めよう	TC43	1990	1293
771	134	The Insta-Guru Course	仙人らくらくコース	TC43	1990	1305
772	134	The Time Copier	タイムコピー	TC43	1982	901
773	134	The Human Remote Control	人間リモコン	TC43	1987	1242
774	134	The All-You-Can-Mine Mix	合成鉱山の素	TC43	1984	1076
775	134	Rock Hard Willpower	強〜いイシ	TC43	1985	1149
776	135	The Fakeit-Makeit Spray	へたうまスプレー	TC43	1985	1141
777	135	The Luck-ing Glass	ラジ難チュー難の相?	TC43	1990	1302
778	135	Noby's Invaders	宇宙戦艦のび太を襲う	TC43	1990	1298
779	135	Bio-Can Blossoms	食べて歌ってバイオ花見	TC43	1990	1304
780	135	Erasing Noby	のび太が消えちゃう?	TC43	1981	814
781	135	Jack, Betty, and Janie	ジャックとベティとジャニー	TC43	1990	1315
782	136	The Place-Trader Pistol	人の身になるタチバガン	TC44	1986	1217
783	136	Realtime Picture Books	現実中継絵本	TC44	1990	1301
784	136	The Ticked-Off Timer	ムシャクシャカーッとしたら	TC44	1977	558
785	136	The 10 Yen Store	十円なんでもストア	TC44	1982	979
786	136	Big G in Love	恋するジャイアン	TC44	1990	1320
787	136	The Fate-flipping Horse	サイオー馬	TC44	1981	812
788	136	The Courier Cap	たくはいキャップ	TC44	1986	1229
789	136	The Cartooner	アニメばこ	TC44	1985	1139
790	137	Big upGrade	おれさまをグレードアップ	TC44	1986	1228
791	137	Noby's Finest Hour	のび太の名場面	TC44	1977	552
792	137	Homemade Missile Defense	手作りミサイル大作戦	TC44	1979	669
793	137	True Hunger	腹ぺこのつらさ知ってるかい	TC44	1977	550
794	137	The Dino Discovery	恐竜の足あと発見	TC44	1985	1163
795	137	The Bug Boards	虫よせボード	TC44	1983	1019
796	137	The Balance Trainer	バランストレーナー	TC44	1990	1316
797	137	Canned Seasons	季節カンヅメ	TC44	1978	613
798	138	Little G's New Comic	ジャイ子の新作まんが	TC44	1990	1312
799	138	Hawaii Comes to Noby	ハワイがやってくる	TC44	1990	1311
800	138	A Slice of Ocean	海をひと切れ切りとって	TC44	1985	1182
801	138	Treasure Planet	宝星	TC44	1980	754
802	138	The Blackhole Pen and Whitehole Pen	ブラック・ホワイトホールペン	TC44	1987	1241
803	139	The Bubble Pipe	うきわパイプ	TC45	1985	1151
804	139	Doraemon Gets Sick	ドラえもんが重病に?	TC45	1989	1283
805	139	The Superlungs	強力ハイポンプガス	TC45	1979	675
806	139	South Seas Adventure	南海の大冒険	TC45	1980	780
807	139	The Nature Model Series	自然観察プラモシリーズ	TC45	1991	1325
808	139	The 4D Trash Can	四次元くずかご	TC45	1985	1185
809	140	The Ship-in-a-bottle Battle	ボトルシップ大海戦	TC45	1990	1319
810	140	The Time Crank	タイムワープリール	TC45	1985	1189
811	140	The Real Board Game	人間すごろく	TC45	1974	336
812	140	Decoy Dolls	身がわり紙人形	TC45	1991	1326
813	140	Cherry Blossoms...No Matter What	何が何でもお花見を	TC45	1986	1216
814	140	The Noby Virus	人間うつしはおそろしい	TC45	1975	346
815	140	The Map Injector	地図ちゅうしゃき	TC45	1985	1193
816	141	Liquid Liquid	トロリン	TC45	1976	450
817	141	The Man from Planet Galapa	ガラパ星からきた男	TC45	1994	1328
818	142	The Gourmet Tablecloth	グルメテーブルかけ	DP1	1981	823
819	142	Tickle Gloves	コチョコチョ手袋	DP1	1974	290
820	142	Noby vs. Noby	ぼくを止めるのび太	DP1	1977	557
821	142	The In-and-Out Cloud	半分おでかけ雲	DP1	1987	1243
822	142	Heart Chocolates	ココロチョコ	DP1	1980	747
823	142	The Secret Dog	ヒミツゲンシュ犬	DP1	1980	746
824	142	Substitute Stickers	代用シール	DP1	1982	909
825	143	The Homing Camera	おいかけテレビ	DP1	1970	19
826	143	Focus Bubbles	集中力増強シャボンヘルメット	DP1	1986	1222
827	143	The Perfect Photo Printer	おこのみフォト・プリンター	DP1	1986	1225
828	143	Elephant Lipstick	ゾウ印口べに	DP1	1975	373
829	143	The Flowercorder	ろく音フラワー	DP1	1975	375
830	143	The Trick Candlestick	しん気ろうそく立て	DP1	1984	1090
831	143	The Rescue Bee	ハチにたのめばなんとかなるさ	DP1	1985	1174
832	144	The Future Radio	みらいラジオ	DP1	1976	459
833	144	The Taxi-kerchief	ふろしきタクシー	DP1	1974	315
834	144	Chiller Tickets	スリルチケット	DP1	1986	1238
835	144	Airshoes	空中シューズ（不運は、のび太のツヨーイ味方!?）	DP1	1985	1178
836	144	The World's Strongest Pet	強いペットがほしい	DP1	1979	701
837	144	The Bug Listeners	虫の声を聞こう	DP1	1974	316
838	144	The Room Guard Set	ルームガードセット	DP1	1984	1063
839	144	The One-Step-at-a-Timer	きらいなテストにガ〜ンバ!	DP1	1985	1190
840	145	The Substitute-Me TV	身がわりテレビ	DP2	1990	1308
841	145	The Invisi-Scroll	ドロン巻き物	DP2	1976	433
842	145	Go On and Hit Me	なぐられたってへっちゃらだい	DP2	1977	501
843	145	The Change of Heart Fan	変心うちわ	DP2	1975	369
844	145	Button Thief	バッジどろぼう	DP2	1973	219
845	145	Shiverincense	ゾクゾク線香	DP2	1974	312
846	145	Optical Ivy	光ファイバーつた	DP2	1986	1227
847	145	The Misery Meter	いやな目メーター	DP2	1974	292
848	146	The Order Gun	命れいじゅう	DP2	1983	1000
849	146	The Dream Director Chair	ユメかんとくいす	DP2	1986	1213
850	146	The Restorelixir	全体復元液	DP2	1989	1286
851	146	Super Big G	スーパージャイアン	DP2	1979	657
852	146	The Earth Escape Plan	地球脱出計画	DP2	1977	512
853	146	Find the Concentrator	夢中機を探せ	DP2	1974	330
854	146	The Call Button	呼びつけブザー	DP2	1976	464
855	147	Program Freckles	人間プログラミングほくろ	DP2	1985	1198
856	147	The Pinch Runner	ピンチランナー	DP2	1989	1291
857	147	The Pet Pen	ペットペン	DP2	1983	1053
858	147	The Time Pistol	タイムピストルで"じゃまもの"は消せ	DP2	1990	1297
859	147	Big Noby vs. Little Big G	大きくなってジャイアンをやっつけろ	DP2	1973	184
860	147	The Payday Problem	月給騒動	DP2	1973	245
861	148	The Audio Camera	サウンドカメラ	DP3	1978	614
862	148	Scare Specs	きもだめしめがね	DP3	1985	1171
863	148	Who Needs Doraemon?	ドラえもんがいなくてもだいじょうぶ!?	DP3	1990	1309
864	148	Attraction Reaction	みせかけモテモテバッジで大さわぎ	DP3	1980	762
865	148	Where Was It When	そのときどこにいた	DP3	1989	1274
866	148	The Monster Trunk	お化けツヅラ	DP3	1979	689
867	149	The Comeback Kaboom	一発逆転ばくだん	DP3	1984	1086
868	149	Around the World in 80 Square Feet	室内世界旅行セット	DP3	1985	1181
869	149	Halo of Gratitude	アリガターヤ	DP3	1971	109
870	149	The Portable Police Car	正義のパトカー	DP3	1974	325
871	149	Travel Paper	トビレットペーパー	DP3	1984	1109
872	149	The Remote Control Double-oon	あやつりそっくりふうせん	DP3	1980	809
873	149	Baggage Check Tags	一時あずけカード	DP3	1985	1196
874	149	Uber Pepper	ばくはつこしょう	DP3	1977	554
875	150	The Phantomizer	ホログラ機	DP3	1984	1078
876	150	The Phobia-Maker	苦手つくり機	DP3	1979	661
877	150	Speed Goggles	スピード増感ゴーグル	DP3	1989	1290
878	150	The Pet-a-lizer	ペッター	DP3	1986	1223
879	150	Stick-with-it Gum	シャラガム	DP3	1976	420
880	150	The Muscle Controller	筋肉コントローラー	DP3	1978	575
881	150	The Cockroach Costume	ゴキブリカバー	DP3	1979	705
882	151	The Million-Volt Eyes	百万ボルトひとみ	DP4	1978	631
883	151	The Dramaticam	「チャンスカメラ」で特ダネ写真を...	DP4	1981	893
884	151	The Holo-Faker	みせかけ落がきペン	DP4	1985	1195
885	151	Noby's Best Friend	チューケンパー	DP4	1976	465
886	151	Mini Santa	ミニサンタ	DP4	1978	641
887	151	Treasure Hunt Paper	宝さがしペーパー	DP4	1984	1127
888	151	The Coldbeater Crown	風の子バンド	DP4	1974	340
889	152	Abominable Snow Job	雪男のアルバイト	DP4	1979	710
890	152	The TV Telephone	テレテレホン	DP4	1984	1121
891	152	The Calamity-Caster	災難予報機	DP4	1980	760
892	152	Animal Training	動物くんれん屋	DP4	1978	604
893	152	Imagi-Gum	イメージガム	DP4	1983	1048
894	152	The Carrier Plane	でんしょひこうき	DP4	1982	944
895	152	Traffic Sign Stickers	交通ひょうしきステッカー	DP4	1985	1169
896	153	The E-Z Hot Air Balloon	エネルギーせつやく熱気球	DP4	1984	1060
897	153	The Curse Cap	ウラメシズキン	DP4	1974	291
898	153	Buddy Badges	なかまバッジ	DP4	1987	1251
899	153	The All-Seeing Glasses	万能グラス	DP4	1980	725
900	153	The Human Timer	人間用タイムスイッチ	DP4	1975	396
901	153	Dorami and Doraemon	ドラえもんとドラミちゃん	DP4	1979	696
902	154	The Say and Obey Caps	イイナリキャップ	DP5	1973	259
903	154	The Boot Camp Fear Trainers	「スパルタ式にが手こくふく錠」と「にが手タッチバトン」	DP5	1983	1051
904	154	The Dreamcorder	ユメコーダー	DP5	1974	281
905	154	The War of the Whispers	ないしょ話...	DP5	1985	1192
906	154	Photos that Feel	エアコンフォト	DP5	1989	1262
907	154	Secrets of Idol Singers	人気歌手翼ちゃんの秘密	DP5	1985	1197
908	154	The Shooting Star Catcher	流れ星ゆうどうがさ	DP5	1990	1323
909	155	The So-be-it Shells	そうなる貝セット	DP5	1985	1199
910	155	Snow in March	三月の雪	DP5	1976	418
911	155	The Sweetbot	いたわりロボット	DP5	1975	387
912	155	The Test Talker	架空通話アダプター	DP5	1977	551
913	155	The Magic Map	まほうの地図	DP5	1971	94
914	155	Shunner-Stunners	無視虫	DP5	1986	1204
915	156	The Traffic Timer	こうつうきせいタイマー	DP5	1987	1247
916	156	Bang-Paper	かんしゃく紙	DP5	1980	788
917	156	Fusion Glue Hiking	合体のりでハイキング	DP5	1976	451
918	156	Pencil Missiles and Countermeasure Radar	ペンシル・ミサイルと自動しかえしレーダー	DP5	1982	954
919	156	45 Years from Now	45年後...	DP5	1985	1173
920	156	The Uber-Strongman Pill	強力ウルトラスーパーデラックス錠	DP5	1989	1280
921	156	The Confession Hat	ざんげぼう	DP5	1985	1145
922	157	The Self-Alarm	セルフアラーム	DP6	1989	1268
923	157	The Roachflute	ごきぶりふえ	DP6	1975	391
924	157	Bride of Tutorzilla	にっくきあいつ	DP6	1976	432
925	157	The Every Bit Helper	「チリつもらせ機」で幸せいっぱい?	DP6	1990	1322
926	157	My Little Newsroom	新聞社ごっこセット	DP6	1978	592
927	157	The Sticky-Boatdeck	ペタリ甲板	DP6	1979	687
928	158	The E-Z Collect-o-Box	標本採集箱	DP6	1981	874
929	158	Nosebubbles	はなバルーン	DP6	1979	678
930	158	The Freckle Flipper	うつしぼくろ	DP6	1974	326
931	158	The Temper Heater	カッカホカホカ	DP6	1977	556
932	158	The Fatigue-Frogger	ケロンパス	DP6	1974	337
933	158	The Time Bomb Badge	チクタクボンワッペン	DP6	1976	463
934	158	The New Year's Sunrise Set	初日の出セット	DP6	1979	645
935	158	The Robot Snowman	ロボット雪だるま	DP6	1977	494
936	159	Emotion Elixir	カンゲキドリンク	DP6	1982	911
937	159	The Dreampleter Chip	ユメ完結チップ	DP6	1986	1221
938	159	Impossi-Bread	クエーヌパン	DP6	1975	356
939	159	The Revenge House	チューシン倉でかたきうち	DP6	1980	734
940	159	The Owner Identifier	持ち主あて機	DP6	1977	549
941	159	Identical Pet Food	そっくりペットフード	DP6	1990	1317
942	159	The Body-Swap Bar	身がわりバー	DP6	1979	650
943	160	Bird Caps	バードキャップ	DCW1	1984	1073
944	160	Chameleon Tea	カメレオン茶	DCW1	1985	1200
945	160	Jack Beans	ジャック豆	DCW1	1985	1188
946	160	The Japanese Rhymelight	ゴロアワセトウ	DCW1	1983	1013
947	160	Tank Pants	戦車ズボン	DCW1	1982	931
948	160	The Role Plate	なりきりプレート	DCW1	1985	1164
949	160	The Invisible Hands	とうめいハンド	DCW1	1984	1098
950	160	Maglev Chalk	リニアモーターチョーク	DCW1	1982	945
951	160	The Inny-Outie	ナカミスイトール	DCW1	1984	1091
952	160	The Pop-Out Animal Farm	生き物しいくジオラマブック	DCW1	1985	1170
953	161	The Ocean Controller	海水コントローラー	DCW1	1980	782
954	161	The Enlargifying Glass	大きくなる虫めがね	DCW1	1983	1007
955	161	Trampoline Spray	トランポリンゲン	DCW1	1983	1043
956	161	The Cordless Can Phone	糸なし糸でんわ	DCW1	1985	1194
957	161	The Fountain of Maturity Rope	としの泉ロープ	DCW1	1983	1049
958	161	Mirror World	あべこべ世界ミラー	DCW1	1983	1037
959	161	Chasing Thumbelina	お話バッジ（おやゆび姫をおいかけろ）	DCW1	1981	896
960	161	Smoke Man	モクモクマン	DCW1	1987	1252
961	161	The Task-Trader	すること入れかえ機	DCW1	1979	708
962	161	The Butterflapter	バタバタフライ	DCW1	1978	585
963	162	Travel Paper	ハイレールペーパー	DCW2	1983	1025
964	162	Waterproofing Spray	カサイラズ	DCW2	1986	1236
965	162	The Shadow Snapper	影ぼうしフラッシュ	DCW2	1985	1176
966	162	The Shrink-Grow Cup	中身ごとのびちぢみカップ	DCW2	1986	1239
967	162	The Georeplicator	箱庭フレーム	DCW2	1981	875
968	162	The Total Safety Umbrella	ぜったい安全がさ	DCW2	1982	938
969	162	The Picture-Portal Projector	写真入りこみスコープ	DCW2	1981	839
970	162	Pet Paint	ペットペンキ	DCW2	1983	1001
971	162	The Weight Remover	重さすいこみじゅう	DCW2	1984	1085
972	162	Pic Mic Elixir	シャシンシャベール	DCW2	1984	1061
973	163	Sleepwalk Stickers	いねむりシール	DCW2	1985	1146
974	163	The Fortune Card Dealer	うらないカードボックス	DCW2	1986	1206
975	163	Reality Scissors	実物はさみ	DCW2	1984	1110
976	163	Into the Mirror	出入りかがみ	DCW2	1982	924
977	163	The Morph-Bot	変身ロボット	DCW2	1985	1158
978	163	Inny Outy Dust	中身ポン	DCW2	1977	560
979	163	The Reverse Kite	あげられたこ	DCW2	1983	987
980	163	Date Line Chalk	日づけ変更チョーク	DCW2	1984	1128
981	163	The Landboat	陸上ボート	DCW2	1982	980
982	163	The Balloon Express	どこでもふうせん	DCW2	1987	1248
983	164	Projection Paint	デカチンキ	DCW3	1979	664
984	164	Breakit and Fixit Stickers	「なおしバン」と「こわしバン」	DCW3	1985	1134
985	164	The Personal TV Station	ミニテレビ局	DCW3	1983	1055
986	164	The Anywhere-o-rama	実物ジオラマ	DCW3	1986	1224
987	164	The Anything Controller	なんでもそうじゅう機	DCW3	1984	1116
988	164	The Escape Dumpling	お助けだんご	DCW3	1985	1152
989	164	Water Striders	あめんぼう	DCW3	1980	744
990	164	The Marionetter	マリオネッター	DCW3	1984	1104
991	164	The Shadow Solidifier	影ふみオイル	DCW3	1983	1031
992	164	A 3D Experience	実体げんとう機（本物げんとう機）	DCW3	1980	775
993	165	R/C Heart Parts	ラジコンのもと	DCW3	1979	686
994	165	The Warp Pen	ワープペン	DCW3	1986	1230
995	165	My Own Genie	まじんのいないまほうのランプ	DCW3	1986	1212
996	165	Animal Finger Puppets	動物指キャップ	DCW3	1986	1218
997	165	The Robot Suit	ロボット服	DCW3	1980	758
998	165	The Hyperbolic Camera	大げさカメラ	DCW3	1984	1079
999	165	The Inanimator Wand	無生物しきぼう	DCW3	1985	1140
1000	165	The Dream Hole	夢ホール	DCW3	1984	1067
1001	165	Pathfinder Cards	道すじカード	DCW3	1980	730
1002	165	The Dandelion Fuzz Comb	たんぽぽくし	DCW3	1979	672
1003	166	Air Crayons	空気クレヨン	DCW4	1981	846
1004	166	The Nagging Rod	こごとひらいしん	DCW4	1981	889
1005	166	The Pocket Traffic Light	ポケット信号機	DCW4	1983	994
1006	166	Plant Walker Liquid	植物あるかせ液	DCW4	1981	861
1007	166	The Friend-Caller	おとりケース	DCW4	1981	853
1008	166	Slide Spray	スベールガス	DCW4	1981	868
1009	166	Playing with Typhoons	台風遊び	DCW4	1979	694
1010	166	R/C TV	ラジコンテレビ	DCW4	1980	810
1011	166	Never-Lose Labels	持ちぬしシール	DCW4	1980	789
1012	166	The Animal Dress-Up Set	動物セット	DCW4	1979	702
1013	167	The Snow Cloudrider	雪ぐもベース	DCW4	1981	817
1014	167	The Reversi-Mirror	とりかえミラー	DCW4	1980	796
1015	167	The Thought Projector	イメージ灯	DCW4	1978	590
1016	167	Go Parts	乗り物アクセサリー	DCW4	1979	646
1017	167	The Correcto-Perfecto	完全しゅうせいき	DCW4	1982	937
1018	167	Smackdown Spray	自動ぶんなぐりガス	DCW4	1981	895
1019	167	The Thinking Cap	イメージベレーぼう	DCW4	1983	986
1020	167	Cloud Chow	きんとフード	DCW4	1980	743
1021	167	The Wish Blaster	ノゾミルじゅう	DCW4	1978	632
1022	167	The Elevator Buttons	エレベート・ボタン	DCW4	1983	993
1023	168	Doraemon: the Robot from the Future	未来から来たドラえもん	DCW5	1969	3
1024	168	The Spook Detector	お化けたん知機（弱いおばけ）	DCW5	1970	33
1025	168	The Beach in the Closet	ふしぎな海水浴	DCW5	1970	45
1026	168	The Tickle Me Flea	くすぐりノミ	DCW5	1970	51
1027	168	Silly Pepper	ネンドロン	DCW5	1970	76
1028	168	The Flubag	かぜぶくろ	DCW5	1971	82
1029	168	The Robot Car	ロボット・カー	DCW5	1971	93
1030	168	The Christmas Tree Seed	クリスマスツリーのたね	DCW5	1971	128
1031	168	The Magnet Mirror	引きよせかがみ	DCW5	1972	173
1032	169	The Medicine Maker	薬製造機（ふしぎな薬）	DCW5	1972	182
1033	169	Invisipaint	とうめいペンキ	DCW5	1973	187
1034	169	The Ultra Ring	ウルトラリング	DCW5	1973	192
1035	169	Cloud Clay	雲ねんど	DCW5	1973	200
1036	169	Telekinesis Drops	念力目薬	DCW5	1973	198
1037	169	The Self-Confidence Helmet	自信ヘルメット	DCW5	1973	214
1038	169	Reality Crayons	本物クレヨン	DCW5	1973	224
1039	169	Camping	キャンプ	DCW5	1973	232
1040	169	Time Traveler	タイムマシン	DCW5	1972	158
1041	169	The Star Sledgehammer	流れ星製造トンカチ	DCW5	1972	172
1042	170	The Treasure-Finder	たからさがしカウンター	DCW6	1977	566
1043	170	Noby's Web	クモノイトン	DCW6	1978	572
1044	170	R/C Army	ラジコンでやっつけろ	DCW6	1978	584
1045	170	Mini Garage	ミニカーガレージ	DCW6	1978	591
1046	170	Fun with Cloud Clay	ふわりねんど	DCW6	1979	659
1047	170	Paper House	ふしぎなかみのいえ	DCW6	1978	597
1048	170	The Plant Pen	植物ペン	DCW6	1978	596
1049	170	Mr. Rope	まほうのひも	DCW6	1973	186
1050	170	Pep Pellets	げんきえさ	DCW6	1979	665
1051	170	Circus Shoes	サーカスぐつ	DCW6	1977	522
1052	171	The Hypnosis Pendulum	さいみんふりこ	DCW6	1973	223
1053	171	Air Gloves	空気てぶくろ	DCW6	1979	679
1054	171	The Cloud Oven	雲やきなべ	DCW6	1982	923
1055	171	The Ultra Super Batteries	ウルトラスーパー電池	DCW6	1978	602
1056	171	The Roller Patroller	パトローラー	DCW6	1980	774
1057	171	Puddle Cream	ドンブラクリーム	DCW6	1974	313
1058	171	The Course Marker	コース決定機	DCW6	1978	620
1059	171	Leaf Money	木の葉でお買い物	DCW6	1978	626
1060	171	The Training Ring	ごくうリング	DCW6	1979	652
1061	171	The Auto-Puppet Show	自動人形劇	DCW6	1980	736
1062	172	The Street Fighting Set	けんかマシン	CWF1	1970	13
1063	172	Doraemon's Desk-Drawer Debut	机からとび出したドラえもん	CWF1	1969	2
1064	172	My Beloved Little G	愛妻ジャイ子!?	CWF1	1970	8
1065	172	Noby Gets Strong	のび太が強くなる	CWF1	1970	14
1066	173	Baseball Dream Team	やきゅうそうどう	CWF1	1970	9
1067	173	The Robot God of Fortune	ロボット福の神	CWF1	1970	37
1068	173	The Okey Mikey	オーケーマイク	CWF1	1970	15
1069	173	Doraemon Goes Home	ドラえもん未来へ帰る	CWF1	1971	86
1070	173	The Peeping Ghost	のぞきお化け	CWF1	1970	43
1071	174	The Comic Artist	まんが家	CWF1	1970	20
1072	174	Doraemon Sings!	ドラえもんの歌	CWF1	1971	117
1073	174	No More Doraemon?!	ドラえもんがいなくなっちゃう!?	CWF1	1972	137
1074	174	Doraemon's Debut!	ドラえもん登場!	CWF2	1969	4
1075	174	The Never-misser	アタールガン	CWF2	1970	10
1076	174	The Time TV	タイムテレビ	CWF2	1970	16
1077	175	Sticky Shoes and Grabby Gloves	ペタリぐつとペタリ手ぶくろ	CWF2	1970	21
1078	175	The Gravity Twister	引力ねじ曲げ機	CWF2	1970	57
1079	175	Iron Drops	がんじょう	CWF2	1970	69
1080	175	The Teleporter	物体瞬間移動機	CWF2	1972	138
1081	175	Let's Go Hiking!	ハイキングに出かけよう	CWF2	1973	196
1082	175	The Trick-less Trick	たねのない手品	CWF2	1971	98
1083	176	Buried Treasure	宝さがし	CWF2	1973	266
1084	176	World "Peace" Association	世界平和安全協会?	CWF2	1974	311
1085	176	Possessing Big G	ジャイアン乗っとり	CWF2	1974	328
1086	176	Scaredy Cat	ねずみこわーい	CWF3	1970	22
1087	176	The Vend-Anything Machine	役立つもの販売機	CWF3	1971	103
1088	177	I Wanna Be a Dog	いぬになりたい	CWF3	1970	46
1089	177	Ultradog	ウルトラワン	CWF3	1970	52
1090	177	Dreams	ゆめ	CWF3	1970	58
1091	177	Walking through Walls	かべぬけき	CWF3	1970	70
1092	177	The Magic Magnifying Glass	虫めがね	CWF3	1971	83
1093	177	The Magic Clock	まほうのとけい	CWF3	1971	89
1094	178	Bad Medicine	いんちき薬	CWF3	1971	115
1095	178	The Truth Transmitter	ショージキデンパ	CWF3	1971	119
1096	178	The Earth Diving Suit	潜地服	CWF3	1972	150
1097	178	The Happy Heater	しあわせカイロでにっこにこ	CWF3	1973	251
1098	178	Searching for a Tsuchinoko	ツチノコさがそう	CWF3	1974	304
1099	178	The Reset Roller	フリダシニモドル	CWF3	1972	181
1100	178	Mountain Rescue	雪山遭難を助けろ	CWF3	1973	227
1101	178	The Ultra Stopwatch	ウルトラストップウォッチ	CWF3	1973	235
1102	179	Instant Pitfall	そくせきおとしあな	CWF4	1971	95
1103	179	Magic Faucet	まほうのじゃぐち	CWF4	1971	100
1104	179	Shadow Puppets	かげえごっこ	CWF4	1971	104
1105	179	The Disguise Suit	変装服	CWF4	1971	108
1106	179	Doraemon's Pocket	ドラえもんのポケット	CWF4	1971	112
1107	179	The Trickerchief	手品ふろしき	CWF4	1971	116
1108	179	Animal Candy	動物キャンディー	CWF4	1971	120
1109	179	Face-Off Soap	ふくわらい石けん	CWF4	1971	132
1110	179	Homework Pajamas	べんきょうねまき	CWF4	1972	136
1111	179	Rocket Gum	ロケットガム	CWF4	1972	140
1112	179	The Wacky Wallet	タヌキさいふ	CWF4	1973	246
1113	179	Ghost Incense	オバケせんこう	CWF4	1972	155
1114	179	The Payback Hands	お返しハンド	CWF4	1972	159
1115	180	The Magic Box	マジックボックス	CWF4	1974	297
1116	180	The Sickness Simulator	仮病薬	CWF4	1976	413
1117	180	The Re-Action Recorder	アクト・コーダー	CWF4	1976	419
1118	180	Bloomin' Ashes	花さくはい	CWF5	1972	144
1119	180	Going Buggy	むしめがねでへんしん	CWF5	1972	148
1120	180	The Height Competition	うちでの小づちでせいくらべ	CWF5	1972	152
1121	180	Mole Mittens	もぐら手ぶくろ	CWF5	1972	156
1122	180	The Snow Cloud	ゆきぐも	CWF5	1972	160
1123	180	The Real Light	本物ライト	CWF5	1972	164
1124	180	The Never-Fall Tightrope	落ちないつな	CWF5	1972	168
1125	180	Playing with Fish	魚と遊ぼう	CWF5	1972	179
1126	180	Animal Drops	動物ドロップ	CWF5	1972	183
1127	180	The Doppelgang-er	みがわりペンダント	CWF5	1973	231
1128	180	The Jack-in-the-Box	びっくりばこ	CWF5	1973	239
1129	181	Powermax Mints	スーパーパワーゲン	CWF5	1973	255
1130	181	Sidestep Socks	ヒラリくつ下	CWF5	1974	276
1131	181	The Human Magnet	人間磁石	CWF5	1974	283
1132	181	Echo Mountain	山びこ山	CWF5	1974	289
1133	181	The Detour Arrows	こいこいマークでお中元	CWF5	1974	300
1134	181	The Instant Pearl Maker	しんじゅせいぞうロボット	CWF5	1973	269
1135	181	The Swapper String	引っ越しひも	CWF5	1974	324
1136	181	Fruit Thievery	カキどろぼう	CWF5	1974	329
1137	181	Noby Broadcasting Corporation	のび太放送協会	CWF5	1975	386
1138	182	Dreaming with Doraemon	ゆめまくらでドッキリ	CWF6	1973	216
1139	182	The Mind Reader	ココロをのぞいちゃえ	CWF6	1973	248
1140	182	Power Glasses	ふしぎなめがね	CWF6	1973	256
1141	182	The Donation Box	おとしだまぼきん	CWF6	1973	270
1142	182	The R/C Paper Airplane	折り紙ラジコン	CWF6	1974	307
1143	182	Arm & Leg Heads	手足につけるミニ頭	CWF6	1975	345
1144	182	The Tele-Tagger	実物射的で狙い撃ち	CWF6	1977	538
1145	182	The Impasse-a-pole	通せんぼう	CWF6	1974	295
1146	182	The Invincibath	ジークフリート	CWF6	1977	544
1147	183	The Creature Communicator	どうぶつごヘッドホン	CWF7	1975	351
1148	183	Wild Beast-Taming Pellets	桃太郎印のきびだんご	CWF7	1975	357
1149	183	The Creature Teacher Glove	猛獣ならし手ぶくろ	CWF6	1978	569
1150	183	The Mirrorizer	かわり絵ミラー	CWF7	1976	422
1151	183	The Round Stuff Magnet	まるいものじしゃく	CWF7	1975	367
1152	183	The Badge of Gratitude	サンキューバッジ	CWF7	1976	478
1153	183	The Bouncing Hole	とばしあな	CWF8	1975	397
1154	183	The Elastiscope	のびちぢみスコープ	CWF8	1975	404
1155	183	Heli-Tags	空とぶ荷ふだ	CWF8	1975	411
1156	184	Noby's Tank	ふしぎな戦車	CWF8	1976	417
1157	184	The Tickle-me-flea	くすぐりノミで笑おう	CWF8	1976	440
1158	184	The Pain Reflector	痛みはね返りミラー	CWF8	1976	460
1159	184	The Pop-Through Pillow	つきぬけざぶとん	CWF8	1976	479
1160	184	Kite-Dropping	空高くたこを落とせ	CWF8	1977	565
1161	184	The "Open! Sez Me" Key	ゴマロック	CWF8	1978	577
1162	184	Ask the Fate Forecaster	答え一発! みこみ予ほう機	CWF8	1979	648
1163	184	Noby's Kingdom	のび太王国誕生	CWF8	1981	821
1164	185	Float Spray	ふんわりガス	CWF9	1976	429
1165	185	Racing Fun	ふしぎなじどうしゃ	CWF9	1976	435
1166	185	Gone Fishing	さかなつり	CWF9	1976	441
1167	185	The Delivery Dish	とりよせつぼ	CWF9	1976	447
1168	185	Karate Juice	空手ドリンク	CWF9	1976	454
1169	185	Mini Typhoons	ミニたいふう	CWF9	1976	468
1170	185	Monkeying Around	キングコング	CWF9	1976	474
1171	185	The Fantasy Lens	空想レンズ	CWF9	1977	547
1172	185	The Psychic Robot	テレパスロボット	CWF9	1978	589
1173	186	The Air Stair Maker	空気ブロックせいぞう機	CWF9	1979	651
1174	186	The Obedient Robot	すなおなロボットがほし〜い!	CWF9	1980	792
1175	186	The Human Camera	人間カメラはそれなりに写る	CWF9	1981	820
1176	186	Spinners	クルリン自動車	CWF10	1977	509
1177	186	The Forced Savings Plan	むりやり貯金箱	CWF10	1977	516
1178	186	Aquarium Spray	水族館ガス	CWF10	1977	529
1179	186	Waterproof Origami	防水折り紙	CWF10	1977	535
1180	186	The Dream Pillow	夢まくら	CWF10	1977	542
1181	186	The Springbringer Fan	はるかぜうちわ	CWF10	1978	579
1182	187	The Viddy-Me Deck	わりこみビデオでテレビ出演	CWF10	1979	663
1183	187	The Moneyball	オトシ玉	CWF10	1980	805
1184	187	Shape Your Body	からだねん土でスマートになろう!	CWF10	1981	842
1185	187	The All-Purpose Tent	万能テントですてきなキャンプ	CWF10	1979	692
1186	187	The Crayon-Cutter	きりがみクレヨン	CWF11	1978	635
1187	187	The Multi-planter	フエールうえ木ばち	CWF11	1978	603
1188	187	The Thunder Drum	かみなりだいこ	CWF11	1978	609
1189	187	Yacht Adventure	ヨット大冒険	CWF11	1978	615
1190	188	R/C Clay	ラジコンねんど	CWF11	1978	621
1191	188	The Emotion Magnum	ゲラメソプンピストル	CWF11	1978	633
1192	188	Making Snow	雪ふらし	CWF11	1979	653
1193	188	The Shockwave Shooter	しょうげき波ピストル	CWF11	1979	658
1194	188	The Body Battery	力をためる力電池	CWF11	1981	855
1195	188	The Photo-Holo Projector	さかさカメラ	CWF11	1981	884
1196	188	The Happiness Insurer	しあわせ保険機	CWF11	1983	990
1197	188	The Completer Beam	かんせいウェーブ	CWF12	1980	795
1198	189	Snow Costumes	雪だるまのぬいぐるみを作ろう!	CWF12	1981	816
1199	189	The Dimensional Roller	次元ローラー	CWF12	1984	1119
1200	189	The Body-Double Guard	そっくりかかし	CWF13	1981	831
1201	189	Air Hooks	空中フック	CWF13	1981	852
1202	189	Animation Spray	アニメスプレー	CWF13	1981	881
1203	189	Prop-board	実物ベニヤ	CWF13	1982	902
1204	189	Medal of Pity	カワイソメダル	CWF13	1983	1038
1205	189	The Case of the Missing Savings	のび太のへそくりが消えた!?	CWF13	1983	992
1206	190	Little Monster's Hat	怪物くんぼうし	CWF14	1982	903
1207	190	The Super Coupon Book	なんでも割引券	CWF13	1984	1075
1208	190	The Fighter Finder	暴力エネルギー探知器	CWF13	1985	1136
1209	190	The Anti-Grav Belt	逆重力ベルト	CWF13	1986	1203
1210	190	The Mynah-Mic	九かんマイク	CWF14	1981	832
1211	190	The Pog Printer & Pogwash	メンコプリンター・無敵メンコレータム	CWF14	1982	958
1212	190	The Stop-Bot	ヤメサセロボット	CWF14	1982	972
1213	190	The Locker Cutter	ロッカーカッター	CWF14	1984	1059
1214	191	Comet Hunters	コメットハンターに挑戦!	CWF14	1986	1233
1215	191	Skyfishing	空中つりセット	CWF15	1982	973
1216	191	Robo-Clay	ロボットねん土	CWF15	1983	1012
1217	191	The Invisible Bodyguard Robot	とうめいボディガードプラモ	CWF15	1983	1018
1218	191	The Tornado Straw	たつまきストロー	CWF15	1983	1024
1219	191	The Instant Ocean Maker	そくせき海つくり機	CWF15	1983	1030
1220	191	The Heli-Camera	ヘリカメラ	CWF15	1983	1036
1221	191	The Travel Screen	観光旅行まど	CWF15	1983	1042
1222	191	Ultra Guy	ウルトラヒーロー	CWF15	1983	1054
1223	192	The Chair Customizer	いすかいりょう機	CWF15	1984	1066
1224	192	The Human Magnet Belt	人間じしゃくベルト	CWF15	1984	1071
1225	192	The Costume Camera and Costume Paste	「ぬいぐるみカメラ」と「クルーム」	CWF15	1985	1132
1226	192	The Tele-Megaphone	望遠メガフォン	CWF15	1986	1214
1227	192	Skink Ink	トカゲロン	CWF15	1984	1084
1228	192	Lightning Grease	デンコーセッカ	CWF15	1984	1103
1229	192	Evil-Banishing Beans	鬼は外ビーンズ	CWF15	1985	1133
1230	192	The Pointer Arrow	ついせきアロー	CWF15	1985	1180
1231	193	Time Glove Revenge	タイム手ぶくろでしかえしを	CWF15	1985	1186
1232	193	The Gimme Hand	チョーダイハンド	CWF16	1985	1175
1233	193	The Costume-Maker Camera	ぬいぐるみせいぞうカメラ	CWF16	1985	1187
1234	193	The R/C Any-tenna	ラジコンアンテナ	CWF16	1986	1205
1235	193	Weather Pens	アメダスペン	CWF16	1986	1211
1236	193	The Friend Ring	みかたゆびわ	CWF16	1986	1234
1237	193	The EZ-Hiking Hat	らくらくとざんぼう	CWF16	1986	1237
1238	193	The Star Rocket	ねがい七夕ロケット	CWF16	1986	1235
1239	194	The Heart Changer Mic	こころふきこみマイク	CWF16	1987	1246
1240	194	The Travel Window Set	旅行窓セット	CWF16	1987	1250
1241	194	Return to Mirrorland	入りこみミラーII	CWF16	1988	1253
1242	194	The Autopilot Footprint Stamp	ゆうどう足あとスタンプ	CWF16	1988	1255
1243	194	The Dream Time Machine	タイムドリーマー	CWF16	1988	1257
1244	194	Playing with Shadows	「影ぶんちん」と「影実体化液」	CWF16	1988	1260
1245	194	The Memory Lens	記憶とり出しレンズ	CWF16	1990	1318
1246	195	The High Rise Escape	高層マンション脱出大作戦	CWF17	1989	1292
1247	195	The Sky Frame	空まです通しフレーム	CWF17	1990	1324
1248	195	Back to the Past	七万年前の日本へ行こう	CWF17	1990	1310
1249	195	The Daruma Cap	ダルマさんころんだ帽	CWF17	1990	1313
1250	195	Handmade Toys	手作りおもちゃ	CWF17	1990	1321
1251	195	Haunted Stuff	こわ〜い! 「百鬼線香」と「説明絵巻」	CWF17	1991	1327
1252	196	Meet Doraemon	ドラえもんがやってきた	CWF18	1969	5
1253	196	The Robo-Pen	ロボットえんぴつ	CWF18	1970	11
1254	196	Cake Farmers	ケーキを育てよう	CWF18	1970	17
1255	196	Fishing with Gadgets	ふしぎな道具で魚つり	CWF18	1970	23
1256	196	The Anything Egg	なんでもたまごに...	CWF18	1970	29
1257	196	The Super Toothbrush	歯みがきで強くなろう	CWF18	1970	35
1258	196	Robot Legs	ロボット足	CWF18	1970	41
1259	196	Swimming in Pictures	絵の中で海水浴	CWF18	1970	47
1260	196	The Mail-bot	ゆうびんロボット	CWF18	1970	53
1261	196	The Personal Train	せん用電車で行こう	CWF18	1970	59
1262	196	The Jump Bow	ジャンプゆみ	CWF18	1970	65
1263	196	Building a Robot	ロボットを作ろう	CWF18	1970	71
1264	196	Magic Pictures	ふしぎなお絵かき	CWF18	1970	78
1265	196	Cloud-Skis and Cloud-Shoes	雲スキーと雲ぐつ	CWF18	1971	84
1266	196	Paper, Rock... Box?	じゃんけん箱	CWF18	1971	90
1267	196	Growing Up Quick	早く大きくなあれ	CWF18	1973	201
1268	197	Really Real Pictures	写したものを出すカメラ	CWF18	1973	209
1269	197	The Morphing Set	変身セットでヒーローに	CWF18	1973	217
1270	197	The Snow Maker	雪を作れる機械	CWF18	1973	225
1271	197	Dorami's Playhouse	ドラミおおはりきり	CWF18	1973	233
1272	197	An Amazing Aquarium	へんなすいぞくかん	CWF18	1973	241
1273	197	Graffiti Erasing Gas	らくがきを消すガス	CWF18	1973	249
1274	197	Toys for One	ひとりで遊べる道具	CWF18	1973	257
1275	197	Fire Truck	しょうぼうしゃ	CWF18	1973	264
1276	197	A Doraemon for You	ドラえもんあげる	CWF18	1969	6
1277	197	Turning Invisible	ひっぱると消えるしっぽ	CWF18	1970	12
1278	197	Playing Flat	ペタンコになって遊ぼう	CWF18	1970	18
1279	197	The String Travel Phone	すいこむ糸電話	CWF18	1970	24
1280	197	As Seen on TV	テレビからお客さま	CWF18	1970	30
1281	197	The Patrol Car	パトロールカー	CWF18	1970	36
1282	197	Mysterious Mirror	ふしぎなかがみ	CWF18	1970	42
1283	197	The Flying Zoo	空とぶ動物園	CWF18	1970	48
1284	197	Firework Seeds	花火のたね	CWF18	1970	54
1285	197	The Wind Rocket	風のロケット	CWF18	1970	60
1286	198	Making Things Bigger	なんでも大きくなるライト	CWF18	1970	66
1287	198	The Magic Zip	マジックチャック	CWF18	1970	72
1288	198	Ricecake Robots	もちつきロボット	CWF18	1970	79
1289	198	The Magic Rope	なんでもロープ	CWF18	1971	85
1290	198	What Time is It?	いま、なん時?	CWF18	1971	91
1291	198	Air Crayon Crazy	空気クレヨンで大さわぎ	CWF18	1971	96
1292	198	The Anything Tree	なんでもツリー	CWF18	1972	170
1293	198	Wear-and-Wash Spray	着たまませんたくできるスプレー	CWF18	1972	175
1294	198	Robot Oni	ロボットのおに	CWF18	1973	188
1295	198	Sand Gloves	手ぶくろですな遊び	CWF18	1973	194
1296	198	Flower Boys and Girls	花さか灰そうどう	CWF18	1973	202
1297	198	The Bird Catcher	鳥とり機	CWF18	1973	210
1298	198	The Police Car	パトカー	CWF18	1973	218
1299	198	Beach Balloons	風船で海水浴	CWF18	1973	226
1300	198	The Arm Conditioner	うでクーラー	CWF18	1973	234
1301	198	The Rain Vacuum	雨そうじ機	CWF18	1973	242
1302	198	Lion Tamers	ネコみたいになるえさ	CWF18	1973	250
1303	198	What If? Box Nighttime Edition	もしもボックスで昼ふかし!?	CWF18	1976	481
1304	199	The Unscrewdriver	分解ドライバー	CWF18	1977	523
1305	199	African Adventure	ターザンパンツで大活躍!?	CWF18	1977	536
1306	199	Doraemon's Birth!	ドラえもん誕生	CWF20	1978	634
1307	200	Challengade	くろうみそ	TC8	1975	355
1308	200	Sonic Solidifier	声のかたまり	TC12	1976	467
1309	200	Portable Parliament	ポータブル国会	TC15	1976	484
1310	200	The Hundred Trials Timer	百苦タイマー	TC18	1978	583
1311	200	Alphabet Jets	「ワ」の字で空をいく	TC34	1982	940
1312	-	(Robot Gachako)	ロボットのガチャ子	CWF2	1970	27
1313	-	(Doraemon vs Gachako)	ドラえもん対ガチャ子	CWF3	1970	28
1314	-	(Dinosaur Came)	きょうりゅうが来た	CWF3	1970	34
1315	-	(Magic Mirror)	まほうのかがみ	CWF3	1970	40
1316	-	(Funny Electricity Wave)	おかしなでんぱ	CWF3	1970	64
1317	-	(Doraemon New Year's gift)	ドラえもんのおとしだま	CWF1	1970	75
1318	-	(A Tree That Becomes An Amusement Park)	遊園地になる木	CWF18	1972	169
1319	-	(Paste Picture Book Doraemon)	はりええほんドラえもん	CWF18	1973	193
1320	-	Dorami: (Order Replacement Device)	ドラミちゃん じゅん番入れかわりそうち	CWF20	1973	271
1321		(Untitled)	(無題）	-	1975	370
1322	-	(Jack and the Beanstalk)	ジャックと豆の木（世界名作童話）	CWF*	1975	399
1323	-	(Doraemon's Big Secret)	ドラえもんの大ひみつ	CWF4	1975	406
1324	-	Dora. Q. Perman	ドラQパーマン	CWF20	1979	688
1325	-	(Road Rays)	道路光線	CWF11	1980	771
1326	-	(Goodbye Handkerchief)	さよならハンカチ	CWF11	1980	772
1327	-	(Shoes Set)	シューズセット	CWF11	1980	773
1328	-	(Human-like Egg)	人間そっくりたまご	CWF12	1981	859

== Other Tankōbon ==
=== Tentōmushi Comics (Normal) ===
First Tankōbon series. 45 volumes in total. 821 episodes. Selection of masterpieces. Abbreviated as "TC".

No.	Release date	ISBN
01	August 1, 1974	4-09-140001-9
001 "All The Way From a Future World" (未来の国からはるばると, Mirai no Kuni Kara Harubaruto); 002 "The Prophecy of Doraemon" (ドラえもんの大予言, Doraemon no Daiyogen); 003 "Transforming Biscuits" (変身ビスケット, Henshin Bisuketto); 004 "Operation: Secret Spy" (秘（丸囲み）スパイ大作戦); 005 "Kobe Abe" (コベアベ, Kobeabe); 006 "Antique Competition" (古道具きょう争); 007 "Peko Peko Grasshopper" (ペコペコバッタ, Peko Peko Batta); 008 "Chin Up To The Ancestors" (ご先祖さまがんばれ, Gosenzo-sama Ganbare); 009 "Hunting Shades" (かげがり, Kagegari); 010 "Flattering Lipstick" (おせじ口べに, Oseji Kurabeni); 011 "Full Points for Once In A Lifetime" (一生に一度は百点を, Ishō ni Ichido wa Hyakuten o); 012 "Operation: Propose" (プロポーズ大作戦, Puropōzu Taisakusen); 013 "Hypnosis Glasses" (◯◯が××と△△する); 014 "Hot hot in the Snow" (雪でアッチッチ, Yuki de Acchicchi); 015 "A Ghost in the Lamp's Smoke" (ランプのけむりオバケ, Ranpu no Kemuri Obake); 016 "Run Run Bamboo Horse" (走れ！ ウマタケ, Hashire! Umatake)
02	September 1, 1974	4-09-140002-7
017 "Memory Bread for Testing" (テストにアンキパン, Tesuto ni Ankipon); 018 "I Love Roboko!" (ロボ子が愛してる, Roboko ga Aishiteru); 019 "Horror Story Lamp" (怪談ランプ, Kaidan Ranpu); 020 "Dream Lamp" (ゆめふうりん, Yume Fuurin); 021 "The Day of my Birth" (ぼくの生まれた日, Boku no Umareta Hi); 022 "Truth Doll" (正直太郎, Shoujiku Tarou); 023 "Shizuka-chan's Hagoromo" (しずちゃんのはごろも, Shizuka chan no Hagoromo); 024 "Liar's Mirror" (うそつきかがみ, Usotsuki Kagami); 025 "Time Cloth" (タイムふろしき, Taimu Furoshiki); 026 "One Hundred Percent Accurate Palm Reading Set" (かならず当たる手相セット, Kanarazu Ataru Tesou Setto); 027 "Wolf's Home" (オオカミ一家, Ookami Ikke); 028 "N-S Crest" (N・Sワッペン, NS Wappen); 029 "Building a Subway" (地下鉄をつくっちゃえ, Chikatetsu o Tsukucchae); 030 "Tatami Paddy Field" (タタミのたんぼ, Tatami no Tanba); 031 "I Will Transfer My Cold to You" (このかぜうつします, Kono Kaze Utsushimasu); 032 "Avalanche in the Study Room" (勉強べやの大なだれ, Benkyou no Dainadare); 033 "Dinosaur Hunter" (恐竜ハンター, Kyouryū hantaa); 034 "How to get a Reply Without Sending a Letter" (出さない手紙の返事をもらう方法, Dasanai Tegami no Henji o Morau Houhou)
03	October 1, 1974	4-09-140003-5
035 "Danger! Lion Mask" (あやうし！ ライオン仮面, Ayaushi! Raion Kamen); 036 "Date Changing Calendar" (日づけ変更カレンダー); 037 "Mama Swap" (ママをとりかえっこ, Mama o Torikaekko); 038 "Sherlock Holmes Set" (シャーロック・ホームズセット); 039 "Schedule Watch" (スケジュールどけい); 040 "Lying Machine" (うそつ機, Usotsu Ki); 041 "Super Dan" (スーパーダン, Suupaa Dan); 042 "1024 Times Bonus" (ボーナス1024倍, Boonasu 1024 Bai); 043 "Guiding Angel" (ミチビキエンゼル, Michibiki Enjeru); 044 "Just-Like-This Crayon" (そっくりクレヨン, Sokkuri Kureyon); 045 "Dress-Up Camera" (きせかえカメラ, Kisakae Kamera); 046 "Ah, I love you, I love you, I love you!" (ああ、好き、好き、好き！, Aa, Suki, Suki, Suki); 047 "Dream Town Nobitaland" (ゆめの町、ノビタランド, Yume no Machi, Nobitarando); 048 "Imagination Pills" (ソウナルじょう, Sounarujou); 049 "I am My Own Tutor" (ぼくを、ぼくの先生に, Boku o, Boku wa Sensei ni); 050 "The Girl Like a White Lily" (白ゆりのような女の子, Shiroyuri no Youna Onna no ko); 051 "Talking Badge" (おはなしバッジ, Ohanashi Bajji); 052 "Live Again, Pero!" (ペロ！ 生きかえって, Pero! Ikikaette)
04	November 1, 1974	4-09-140004-3
053 "Cursed Camera" (のろいのカメラ, Noroi no Kamera); 054 "That Lie is True" (ソノウソホント, Sono Uso Honto); 055 "Toy Soldiers" (おもちゃの兵隊, Omocha no Heitai); 056 "Abeconbe" (アベコンベ, Abekonbe); 057 "Undersea Hiking" (海底ハイキング, Kaitei Haikingu); 058 "Light of the Moon and the Calls of the Bugs" (月の光と虫の声, Tsuki no Hikari to Mushi no Koe); 059 "Change Your Face to Look Like Someone Else" (お客の顔を組み立てよう, Okyaku no Kao o Kumitateyou); 060 "The Way to Get More Money" (してない貯金を使う法, Shitenai Chokin o Tsukau-hō); 061 "Friendship Capsule" (友情カプセル, Yūjō Kapuseru); 062 "The World's end" (世界沈没, Sekai Chinbotsu); 063 "Bypass Spyglass" (スケスケ望遠鏡, Sukesuke Bōenkyō); 064 "Melody Gas" (メロディーガス, Merodeī Gasu); 065 "Nobizaemon's Treasure" (のび左エ門の秘宝, Nobizaemon no Hihō); 066 "Mysterious Person from the Future" (未来世界の怪人, Mirai Sekai no Kaijin); 067 "Kettle Recorder" (ヤカンレコーダー, Yakan Rekōdā); 068 "Pebble Hat" (石ころぼうし, Ishikoro Bōshi); 069 "Lucky Gun" (ラッキーガン, Rakkī Gan); 070 "Memories of Grandma" (おばあちゃんのおもいで, Obā-chan no Omoide)
05	December 1, 1974	4-09-140005-1
071 "Too Fast, Too Slow" (のろのろ、じたばた); 072 "Gravity Paint" (重力ペンキ); 073 "The Earth Creation Kit" (地球製造法); 074 "Nobita in the mirror?" (かがみの中ののび太); 075 "Memory Hammer" (わすれとんかち); 076 "The Super Money Can" (ばっ金箱); 077 "The Five Doraemons" (ドラえもんだらけ); 078 "The 4th Dimension Tricycle" (四次元サイクリング); 079 "The Underground Adventure" (地底の国探検); 080 "The Cape of Evasion" (ひらりマント); 081 "Let's make badges" (バッジを作ろう); 082 "Let's swim in the Pacific ocean!" (うちのプールは太平洋); 083 "Continuing perfume" (つづきスプレー); 084 "The Reality Pillow" (うつつまくら); 085 "Black Belt Nobita?!" (黒おびのび太); 086 "The Winning Lottery Ticket" (宝くじ大当たり); 087 "The Tele-Telephone" (おしかけ電話); 088 "Uncle Elephant" (ぞうとおじさん)
06	December 25, 1974	4-09-140006-X
089 "The Emperor of the Night"; 090 "The Fashion Virus"; 091 "The Dream Holiday"; 092 "The Model Snow Mountain"; 093 "The Replica Encyclopedia"; 094 "The 6 Million Yen Painting"; 095 "Koinburi"; 096 "Representative Gum"; 097 "Anywhere Cannon"; 098 "The Girl with the Red Shoes"; 099 "Ace Cap"; 100 "The Coward Adventurer"; 101 "The Adventure By Submarine"; 102 "The Loch Ness Monster"; 103 "Typhoon Fuuku"; 104 "Jekyll and Hyde"; 105 "Nobita's Bride"; 106 "Adieu, Doraemon"
07	May 2, 1975	4-09-140007-8
107 "Return of Doraemon"; 108 "Tiny Robots"; 109 "Let's fight against Gian's"; 110 "Flying Fishes"; 111 "I Loved a Cat"; 112 "Unravel the World"; 113 "Stealing Mother's Diamond"; 114 "Catastrophe"; 115 "Mouse And Bomb"; 116 "Gift Log from the Future"; 117 "Return to the Stone Age"; 118 "The Magnify Bad Habits Gas"; 119 "The Fusion Machine"; 120 "Super Power Cap"; 121 "Robot Tester"; 122 "Leopard Cat Machine"; 123 "Seven Limbs, Three Eyes"; 124 "Charmed Snake Rope"; 125 "The Mystery Case of the Village Deep in the Mountains"
08	July 3, 1975	4-09-140008-6
126 "Reflection-delay Dustcloth"; 127 "Lighter Play"; 128 "Mad Watch"; 129 "Graph don't Lie"; 130 "Becoming a Singer Sucking Candy"; 131 "Human Manufacturing Machine"; 132 "Bad luck Diamond"; 133 "Live with a Laugh"; 134 "Invisibility Eye Drops"; 135 "Likeable"; 136 "The Mallet Of Good Luck"; 137 "Hard Working Money Bees"; 138 "Human Engine"; 139 "Evolution-Devolution Radiation Source"; 140 "Little Match Doraemon"; 141 "Pretty People Camera"; 142 "The Eye-Witness Scope"; 143 "Boygirl"; 144 "I Am Mari-chan!"; 145 "The Face Eraser'; 146 "If You're Praised By The Robot"; 147 "Hardship Soybean Paste"
09	November 1, 1975	4-09-140009-4
148 "Ching and Impressive Talk"; 149 "We Found Tsuchinoko!; 150 "Celebrating New Year on the Wallpaper"; 151 "Bottle Cap Collection"; 152 "Pass-through Hoop"; 153 "Enjoy Yourself"; 154 "Human Controller"; 155 "Forgetting Grass"; 156 "Urashima Candy"; 157 "How To Make An Unpopulated Island"; 158 "Move The Map"; 159 "Mood Meter"; 160 "The World is Full of Lies"; 161 "Nobita's Nobita"; 162 "Tracer Badge"; 163 "A Snail House is Comfortable"; 164 "The Telephone Ghost"; 165 "Hi, I'm Momotaro."
10	March 29, 1976	4-09-140010-8
166 "Later Candy"; 167 "Human Cutter"; 168 "Apartment Tree"; 169 "Yoro Otsumami"; 170 "Invisible Eye Drops"; 171 "Anytime Diary"; 172 "The 100 Years Later Appendix"; 173 "Selling the Night"; 174 "XYZ Camera"; 175 "Fake Alien"; 176 "Weather Box"; 177 "Invisible Shower"; 178 "Thousand Needles Trout"; 179 "Playing With Dolls"; 180 "Make a Little Brother!"; 181 "Running Away Like Animals"; 182 "Inside the Stomach, Inside the Water"; 183 "Wishing Star"; 184 "Human Radio Control"; 185 "Speed Clock"; 186 "Nobita's Dinosaur"
11	June 30, 1976	4-09-140101-5
187 "The "What if" Phone Booth"; 188 "Robot Paper"; 189 "Politely Kick Out the Unwanted Guest"; 190 "Walking on Clouds"; 191 "Warewolf Cream"; 192 "Crank Up the Speed!"; 193 "The Legendary Sword: Lightning Bolt"; 194 "Disaster Training Machine"; 195 "The Sharing Gum"; 196 "The Hypnosis Glasses"; 197 "The Making of a Television Channel (Dorami Version)"; 198 "Plan Y"; 199 "Antenna of Prediction"; 200 "The bag of Taking Things"; 201 "Swapping Body Parts"; 202 "Machine That Sells Things Through Time"; 203 "Discovery of Antics"; 204 "Gian's Close Friends"; 205 "Doraemon's Secret"
12	November 27, 1976	4-09-140102-3
206 "The Seeking Missile"; 207 "Fortune Telling Through Tongue Reading"; 208 "The Plaster of Truth"; 209 "Reminder Bird"; 210 "Premonition Bug"; 211 "Aerial Warfare"; 212 "Owner Resemblance Dumpling"; 213 "The Hero of Justice:The Masked Warrior"; 214 "Let's Used to the Lightning"; 215 "Weather Chart"; 216 "Dried Ghost"; 217 "Donbura Powder"; 218 "A Giant Appeared"; 219 "Umbrella of Love"; 220 "Indoor Fishing Pond"; 221 "The Strongest Marksman"; 222 "All-in-one Rein"; 223 "Voice Thickener"; 224 "Delay Camera"; 225 "Buying a Castle at Germany"
13	March 31, 1977	4-09-140103-1
226 "Exaggerating Sweater"; 227 "Retrieval Telescope"; 228 "Parasite Nickel"; 229 "World That Not Need Money"; 230 "Electrical Kit"; 231 "Gian Stew"; 232 "Taking an arrow to school"; 233 "Fusion Glue"; 234 "Millionaire Straw"; 235 "Treasure Set"; 236 "The Magic Hand"; 237 "Spaceship Controller"; 238 "Wrestling Killer"; 239 "Reverse Light"; 240 "Something is Gonna Occur by 7 o' Clock"; 241 "Get That Base"; 242 "Passport of Satan"; 243 "Soul Time Machine"; 244 "The Chaos of the Wind"; 245 "Cubic Copy"; 246 "Hi, the Alien"
14	December 20, 1977	4-09-140104-X
247 "Home is further and further away"; 248 "Molting Flashlight"; 249 "Advertising with the Mirror"; 250 "Mood Band's Performance"; 251 "Calling Collar"; 252 "Telepathy Microphone"; 253 "The Secret Pen"; 254 "Boastful Ancestor"; 255 "Typhoon Generator"; 256 "Escape from Home for Uninhabited Island"; 257 "Minicar Driving School"; 258 "The Lazy Day"; 259 "Riding a Ball"; 260 "Nice Mii-chan"; 261 "Into the wrong way!"; 262 "Cannibal House"; 263 "Alien House?"; 264 "Swimming pool in clouds"; 265 "The war of radio-controlled boats"; 266 "Grandpa in the dream"
15	June 27, 1978	4-09-140105-8
267 "Dream Channels"; 268 "Cat Runs a Company"; 269 "Treasure of Chinkara Peak"; 270 "Door Out Of Nothing"; 271 "Switching Rope"; 272 "Chain Letter Syndicate"; 273 "Almighty Pass"; 274 "Catching the villain with Time Machine"; 275 "Peeking Camera"; 276 "Railroad Crossing Kit"; 277 "Redo Life Machine"; 278 "Rank Badges"; 279 "Dictator Switch"; 280 "Copy Gun"; 281 "The Expression Controller"; 282 "Collecting sound pollution in a can"; 283 "Portable Parliament"; 284 "World of Cat's Cradle"
16	December 22, 1978	4-09-140106-6
285 "A World without Sound"; 286 "Time Bank"; 287 "All Seasons Badge"; 288 "I will be the best dad"; 289 "I hate money!"; 290 "Deluxe Light"; 291 "Dream Hat"; 292 "4D Pocket"; 293 "Infinity Lasso"; 294 "Jack-In-The-Box Stick"; 295 "The Absconding Leaf"; 296 "Talking Spray"; 297 "Ultra Armor"; 298 "Singing Tadpoles"; 299 "One Inch Master"; 300 "I Can't Study in the Sahara Desert"; 301 "Playing with clouds"; 302 "A horrible future diary"; 303 "Papa is also preverse"; 304 "Space Tarzan"
17	June 27, 1979	4-09-140107-4
305 "Multiplication Liquid"; 306 "The Great Paper War"; 307 "Weekly Nobita"; 308 "Stranded on an island in the past"; 309 "Exercise Trousers"; 310 "Playing in the sky is dangerous"; 311 "Switching Glove"; 312 "Parallel Planet"; 313 "Protagonist Replacer"; 314 "Keeping moving house"; 315 "Invisible Lacquer"; 316 "Personal Sattellite"; 317 "House becoming a robot"; 318 "U.F.YO"; 319 "Shocking Machine"; 320 "Dorayaki and Movie Have Been Reserved"; 321 "Moas and Dodos Forever"
18	December 20, 1979	4-09-140108-2
19	June 28, 1980	4-09-140109-0
20	December 20, 1980	4-09-140110-4
21	April 25, 1981	4-09-140501-0
22	July 25, 1981	4-09-140502-9
23	December 19, 1981	4-09-140503-7
24	March 27, 1982	4-09-140504-5
25	July 28, 1982	4-09-140505-3
26	December 20, 1982	4-09-140506-1
27	March 28, 1983	4-09-140507-X
28	July 28, 1983	4-09-140508-8
29	December 16, 1983	4-09-140509-6
30	March 28, 1984	4-09-140510-X
31	July 28, 1984	4-09-140801-X
32	December 15, 1984	4-09-140802-8
33	March 28, 1985	4-09-140803-6
34	July 27, 1985	4-09-140804-4
35	December 16, 1985	4-09-140805-2
36	March 28, 1986	4-09-140806-0
37	July 28, 1986	4-09-140807-9
38	December 16, 1986	4-09-140808-7
39	December 16, 1988	4-09-140809-5
40	December 18, 1989	4-09-140810-9
41	July 28, 1990	4-09-141661-6
42	December 18, 1990	4-09-141662-4
43	December 14, 1991	4-09-141663-2
44	April 27, 1993	4-09-141664-0
45	April 26, 1996	4-09-141665-9

=== Tentōmushi Comics (Doraemon Plus) ===
Doraemon Plus is one of many tankōbon series. It's just the title of the book, not the title of the sequel to Doraemon. 6 volumes. 125 episodes. Abbreviated as "DP". All episodes of DP are included in KE(Kindle Edition).
