= Shigeo Ōdachi =

Japanese politician (1892–1955)

- 大達 茂雄
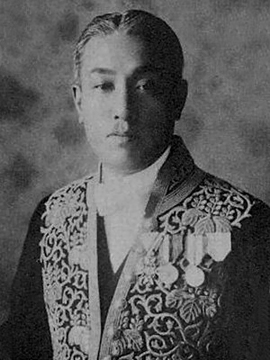

Minister of Education
- In office 21 May 1953 – 10 December 1954
- Prime Minister: Shigeru Yoshida
- Preceded by: Kiyohide Okano
- Succeeded by: Masazumi Andō

Minister of Home Affairs
- In office 22 July 1944 – 7 April 1945
- Prime Minister: Kuniaki Koiso
- Preceded by: Kisaburō Andō
- Succeeded by: Genki Abe

Member of the House of Councillors
- In office 24 April 1953 – 25 September 1955
- Preceded by: Gen'ichirō Date
- Succeeded by: Hiroshi Sano
- Constituency: Shimane at-large

Governor of Tokyo
- In office 1 July 1943 – 22 July 1944
- Monarch: Hirohito
- Preceded by: Mitsuma Matsumura
- Succeeded by: Toshizō Nishio

Mayor of Syonan
- In office 7 March 1942 – 1 July 1943
- Monarch: Hirohito
- Preceded by: Shenton Thomas (as Governor of the Straits Settlements)
- Succeeded by: Kanʼichi Naitō

Governor of Fukui Prefecture
- In office 8 March 1932 – 6 April 1934
- Monarch: Hirohito
- Preceded by: Jōkō Obama
- Succeeded by: Shunsuke Kondo

Personal details
- Born: 5 January 1892 Hamada, Shimane, Japan
- Died: 25 September 1955 (aged 63) Bunkyō, Tokyo, Japan
- Cause of death: Stomach cancer
- Party: Liberal (1950–1955)
- Other political affiliations: Independent (1932–1950)
- Education: Tokyo Imperial University

Shigeo Ōdachi (大達 茂雄, Ōdachi Shigeo; 5 January 1892 – 25 September 1955) was a bureaucrat, politician and cabinet minister in both early Shōwa period Japan and in the post-war era.

== Early life ==
Ōdachi was born in what is now Hamada, Shimane, as the younger son of a local sake brewer. After his graduation in 1916 from the law school of Tokyo Imperial University, he entered the Home Ministry. He rose to the post of Deputy Manager of the Local Affairs Bureau, and was appointed governor of Fukui Prefecture in 1932.

== Political career ==
In 1934, Ōdachi was invited to Manchukuo, where he was appointed director of the Legislative Affairs Office to the State Council and in 1936 he was promoted to director of the General Affairs Board. Along with Naoki Hoshino, he was in charge of is developing the first Five-Year Plan for Manchukuo, which had a strong emphasis on the development of heavy industry. He was replaced by Hoshino later that year and later returned to Japan. From 1939 to 1940 he served as vice minister of Home Affairs in the administrations of Nobuyuki Abe and Mitsumasa Yonai.

Following the start of World War II, on 7 March 1942, Ōdachi was appointed civilian mayor of Shōnan (Singapore) under Japanese occupation. During this period, he was critical of the heavy-handed military administration by the Imperial Japanese Army and its actions against the Chinese population, as well as civilian opportunists who sought to make quick profits under the occupation. His criticism of General Wataru Watanabe, then military administrator of Singapore, led to Watanabe’s reassignment in 1943.

Ōdachi returned to Japan in 1943, and with the amalgamation of Tokyo City and Tokyo-fu into Tokyo Metropolis, he became the first Governor of the Tokyo Metropolis. As the war was quickly deteriorating for Japan, and Tokyo came under increasing threat of attack, he organized the evacuation of children from Tokyo. In September 1943, he gave the order to destroy all of the animals at Ueno Zoo, an act recounted in the post-war book Faithful Elephants. In July 1944, he was asked to join the cabinet of Prime Minister Kuniaki Koiso as Home Minister. Ōdachi was awarded the 1st class of the Order of the Sacred Treasure on 12 September 1944.

After the surrender of Japan, Ōdachi was, along with all other members of the wartime government, purged from public office by orders of the American occupation authorities. However, he was never accused of war crimes. In 1953, he ran for a seat in the post-war upper house of the Diet of Japan, under the Liberal Party banner.

With the support of Chief Cabinet Secretary Taketora Ogata, Ōdachi joined the Fifth Yoshida Cabinet as Minister of Education in 1953. Noted for his conservative, authoritarian outlook, he immediately came into conflict with the leftist Japan Teachers' Union over its socialist-oriented curriculum in schools and due to his efforts to restore the teaching of "public morals" in schools. This led to the passage of a number of laws aimed at enforcing political neutrality in textbooks and in placing restrictions on the hiring of non-civil servants as educators in public schools in 1954. These laws continued to be criticized by the Japan Teachers' Union in the 1950s and 1960s as indicative of the Reverse Course pursued by the Japanese government.

Ōdachi died of stomach cancer in 1955 at the age of 63.

Preceded by Kiyohide Okano	Minister of Education; 1953–1954	Succeeded by Masazumi Andō
Preceded by Kisaburō Andō	Minister of Home Affairs; 1944–1945	Succeeded by Genki Abe
Preceded by Ayao Kishimoto as Mayor of Tokyo	Governor of the Tokyo Metropolis; 1943–1944	Succeeded by Toshizō Nishio
Preceded by Mitsuma Matsumura as Governor of Tokyo Prefecture	Governor of the Tokyo Metropolis; 1943–1944	Succeeded by Toshizō Nishio
Preceded by Shenton Thomas as Governor of the Straits Settlements	Mayor of Syonan; 1942–1943	Succeeded by Kanichi Naito
Preceded by Tetsuji Tachi	Vice Minister of Home Affairs; 1939–1940	Succeeded by Shigeru Hazama
Preceded by Ryūichirō Nagaoka	Director General of the General Affairs Board of Manchukuo; 1936	Succeeded by Naoki Hoshino
