= Hamaguchi cabinet =

Cabinet of Japan (1929–1931)

Hamaguchi Cabinet
- 27th Cabinet of Japan

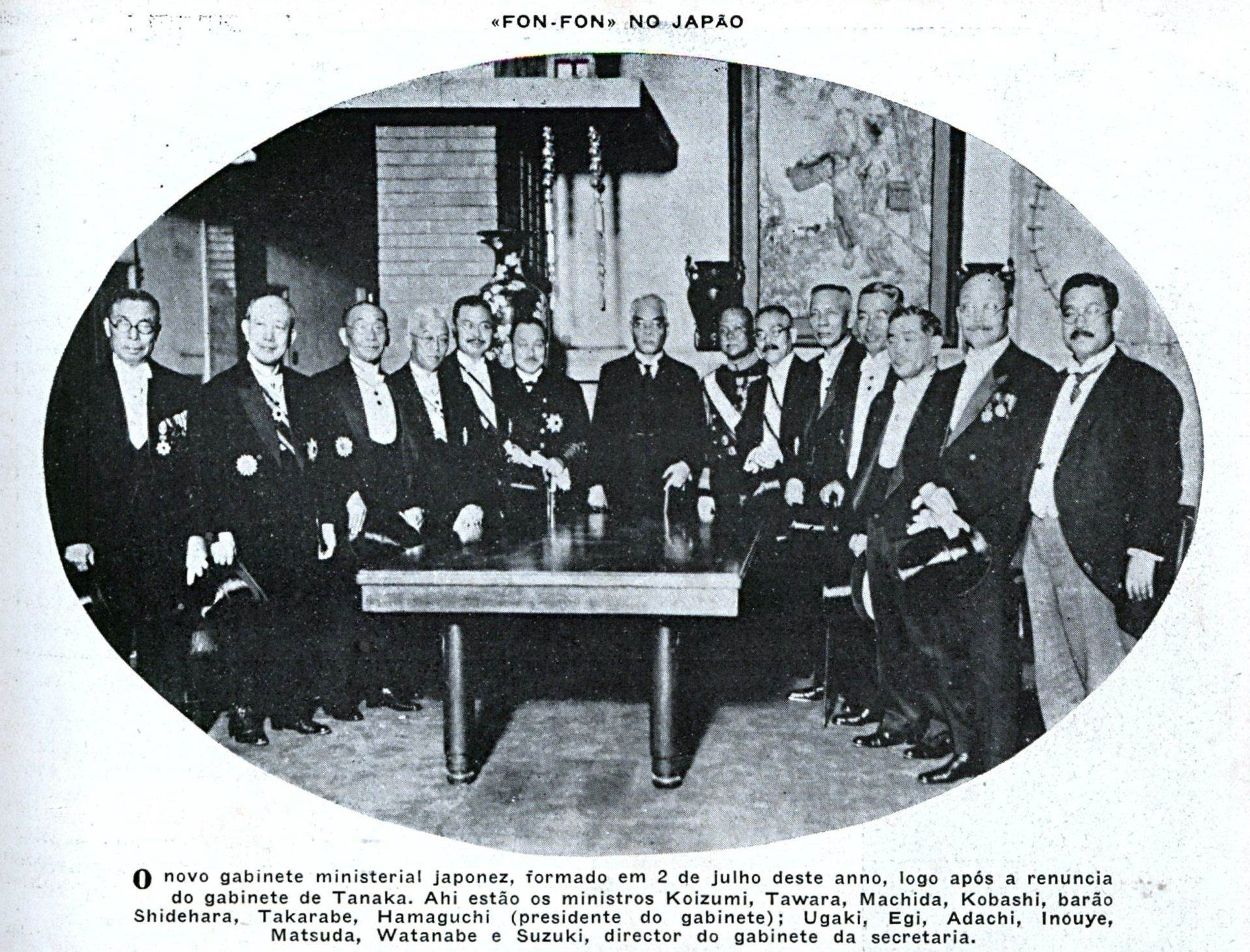
- Date formed: July 2, 1929
- Date dissolved: April 14, 1931

People and organisations
- Emperor: Shōwa
- Prime Minister: Hamaguchi Osachi; Kijūrō Shidehara (acting)
- Member party: HoR Blocs: Rikken Minseitō; HoP Blocs: Kenkyūkai; Kōseikai; Dōwakai; Dōseikai

History
- Election: 1930 general election
- Legislature terms: 57th Imperial Diet; 58th Imperial Diet; 59th Imperial Diet
- Predecessor: Tanaka Giichi Cabinet
- Successor: Second Wakatsuki Cabinet

The Hamaguchi Cabinet is the 27th Cabinet of Japan led by Hamaguchi Osachi from July 2, 1929 to April 14, 1931.

== Cabinet ==
Ministers
Portfolio	Name	Political party	Term start	Term end
Prime Minister	Hamaguchi Osachi	Rikken Minseitō	July 2, 1929	April 14, 1931
Prime Minister	Baron Kijūrō Shidehara (acting)	Independent	November 14, 1930	March 9, 1931
Minister for Foreign Affairs	Baron Kijūrō Shidehara	Independent	July 2, 1929	April 14, 1931
Minister of Home Affairs	Adachi Kenzō	Rikken Minseitō	July 2, 1929	April 14, 1931
Minister of Finance	Junnosuke Inoue	Rikken Minseitō	July 2, 1929	April 14, 1931
Minister of the Army	Kazushige Ugaki	Military (Army)	July 2, 1929	April 14, 1931
Minister of the Army	Nobuyuki Abe (acting)	Military (Army)	June 16, 1930	December 10, 1930
Minister of the Navy	Takarabe Takeshi	Military (Navy)	July 2, 1929	October 3, 1930
Minister of the Navy	Baron Kiyokazu Abo	Military (Navy)	October 3, 1930	April 14, 1931
Minister of Justice	Viscount Watanabe Chifuyu	Independent	July 2, 1929	April 14, 1931
Minister of Education	Kobashi Ichita	Rikken Minseitō	July 2, 1929	November 29, 1929
Minister of Education	Tanaka Ryūzō	Rikken Minseitō	November 29, 1929	April 14, 1931
Minister of Agriculture and Forestry	Machida Chūji	Rikken Minseitō	July 2, 1929	April 14, 1931
Minister of Commerce and Industry	Magoichi Tawara	Rikken Minseitō	July 2, 1929	April 14, 1931
Minister of Communications	Koizumi Matajirō	Rikken Minseitō	July 2, 1929	April 14, 1931
Minister of Railways	Egi Tasuku	Rikken Minseitō	July 2, 1929	April 14, 1931
Minister of Colonial Affairs	Genji Matsuda	Rikken Minseitō	July 2, 1929	April 14, 1931
Minister without portfolio	Nobuyuki Abe	Military (Army)	June 16, 1930	December 10, 1930
Chief Cabinet Secretary	Suzuki Fujiya	Rikken Minseitō	July 2, 1929	April 14, 1931
Director-General of the Cabinet Legislation Bureau	Yonezō Maeda	Association of Friends of Constitutional Government	July 2, 1929	July 3, 1929
Director-General of the Cabinet Legislation Bureau	Kawasaki Takukichi	Rikken Minseitō	July 3, 1929	April 14, 1931
Parliamentary Vice-Ministers
Portfolio	Name	Political party	Term start	Term end
Parliamentary Vice-Minister for Foreign Affairs	Ryūtarō Nagai	Rikken Minseitō	July 5, 1929	April 14, 1931
Parliamentary Vice-Minister of Home Affairs	Saitō Takao	Rikken Minseitō	July 5, 1929	April 14, 1931
Parliamentary Vice-Minister of Finance	Gōtarō Ogawa	Rikken Minseitō	July 5, 1929	April 14, 1931
Parliamentary Vice-Minister of the Army	Count Mizoguchi Naoyoshi	Independent	July 5, 1929	August 19, 1930
Parliamentary Vice-Minister of the Army	Viscount Itō Jiromaru	Independent	August 19, 1930	April 14, 1931
Parliamentary Vice-Minister of the Navy	Baron Yabuki Shōzō	Independent	July 5, 1929	April 14, 1931
Parliamentary Vice-Minister of Justice	Kawasaki Katsu	Rikken Minseitō	July 5, 1929	April 14, 1931
Parliamentary Vice-Minister of Education	Nomura Karoku	Rikken Minseitō	July 5, 1929	April 14, 1931
Parliamentary Vice-Minister of Agriculture, Forestry and Fisheries	Takada Yohei	Rikken Minseitō	July 5, 1929	April 14, 1931
Parliamentary Vice-Minister of Commerce and Industry	Yokoyama Katsutarō	Rikken Minseitō	July 5, 1929	April 14, 1931
Parliamentary Vice-Minister of Communications	Seigō Nakano	Rikken Minseitō	July 5, 1929	December 23, 1930
Parliamentary Vice-Minister of Communications	Nakamura Keijirō	Rikken Minseitō	December 23, 1930	April 14, 1931
Parliamentary Vice-Minister of Railways	Yamaji Jōichi	Rikken Minseitō	July 5, 1929	March 12, 1930
Parliamentary Vice-Minister of Railways	Kurogane Yasuyoshi	Rikken Minseitō	March 12, 1930	April 14, 1931
Parliamentary Vice-Minister of Colonial Affairs	Kosaka Junzō	Rikken Minseitō	July 5, 1929	April 14, 1931
Parliamentary Undersecretaries
Portfolio	Name	Political party	Term start	Term end
Parliamentary Undersecretary for Foreign Affairs	Viscount Oda Nobutsune	Independent	July 5, 1929	April 14, 1931
Parliamentary Undersecretary of Home Affairs	Uchigasaki Sakusaburō	Rikken Minseitō	July 5, 1929	March 11, 1930
Parliamentary Undersecretary of Home Affairs	Ichinomiya Fusajirō	Rikken Minseitō	March 11, 1930	April 14, 1931
Parliamentary Undersecretary of Finance	Masanori Katsu	Rikken Minseitō	July 5, 1929	April 14, 1931
Parliamentary Undersecretary of the Army	Yoshikawa Kichirōbee	Rikken Minseitō	July 5, 1929	April 14, 1931
Parliamentary Undersecretary of the Navy	Momiyama Hiroshi	Rikken Minseitō	July 5, 1929	April 14, 1931
Parliamentary Undersecretary of Justice	Imoto Tsunesaku	Rikken Minseitō	July 5, 1929	April 14, 1931
Parliamentary Undersecretary of Education	Ōasa Tadao	Rikken Minseitō	July 5, 1929	April 14, 1931
Parliamentary Undersecretary of Agriculture, Forestry and Fisheries	Yamada Michie	Rikken Minseitō	July 5, 1929	April 14, 1931
Parliamentary Undersecretary of Commerce and Industry	Iwakiri Shigeo	Rikken Minseitō	July 5, 1929	March 11, 1930
Parliamentary Undersecretary of Commerce and Industry	Noda Bunichirō	Rikken Minseitō	March 11, 1930	April 14, 1931
Parliamentary Undersecretary of Communications	Fukuda Gorō	Rikken Minseitō	July 5, 1929	April 14, 1931
Parliamentary Undersecretary of Railways	Yamamoto Kōzō	Rikken Minseitō	July 5, 1929	April 14, 1931
Parliamentary Undersecretary of Colonial Affairs	Taketomi Wataru	Rikken Minseitō	July 5, 1929	April 14, 1931
