= Second Yamamoto cabinet =

Cabinet of Japan (1923–1924)

Second Yamamoto Cabinet
- 22nd Cabinet of Japan

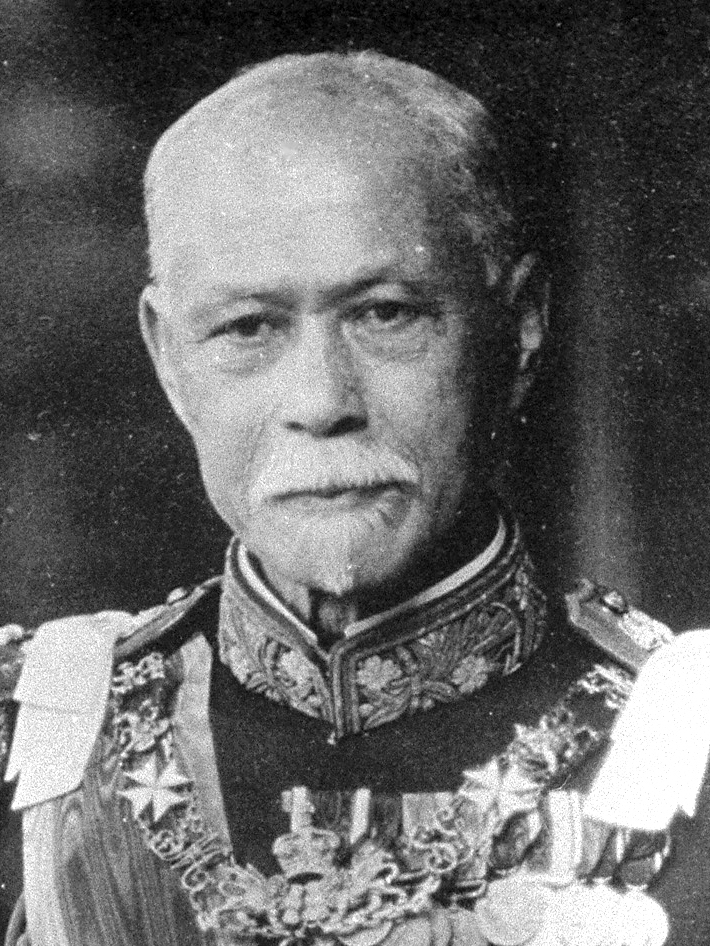
- Prime Minister Yamamoto Gonnohyōe
- Date formed: September 2, 1923
- Date dissolved: January 7, 1924

People and organisations
- Emperor: Taishō
- Prime Minister: Yamamoto Gonnohyōe
- Status in legislature: Majority (coalition)

History
- Legislature terms: 47th Imperial Diet; 48th Imperial Diet
- Predecessor: Katō Tomosaburō Cabinet
- Successor: Kiyoura Cabinet

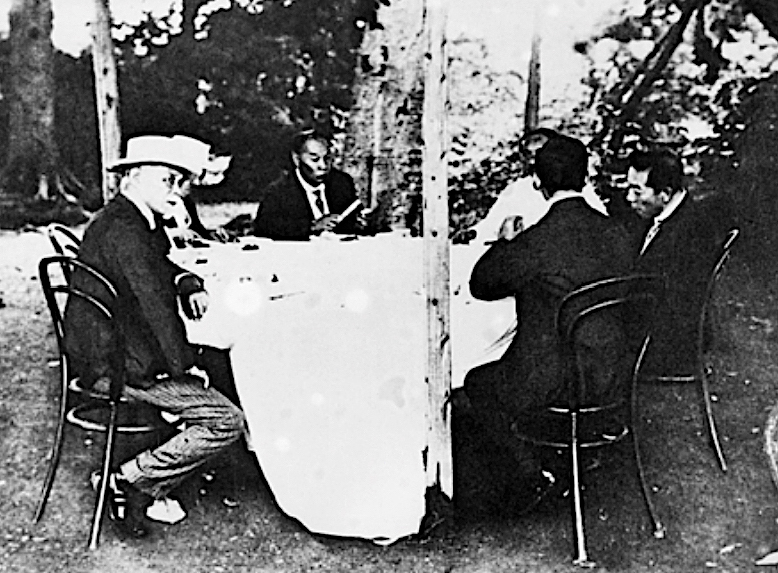
First cabinet meeting held in the courtyard of the Prime Minister's Official Residence

The Second Yamamoto Cabinet is the 22nd Cabinet of Japan led by Yamamoto Gonnohyōe from September 2, 1923 to January 7, 1924.

== Cabinet ==
Portfolio	Minister	Political party	Term start	Term end
Prime Minister	Count Yamamoto Gonnohyōe	Military (Navy)	September 2, 1923	January 7, 1924
Minister for Foreign Affairs	Count Yamamoto Gonnohyōe	Military (Navy)	September 2, 1923	September 19, 1923
Minister for Foreign Affairs	Baron Ijūin Hikokichi	Independent	September 19, 1923	January 7, 1924
Minister of Home Affairs	Baron Gotō Shinpei	Independent	September 2, 1923	January 7, 1924
Minister of Finance	Junnosuke Inoue	Independent	September 2, 1923	January 7, 1924
Minister of the Army	Baron Tanaka Giichi	Military (Army)	September 2, 1923	January 7, 1924
Minister of the Navy	Takarabe Takeshi	Military (Navy)	September 2, 1923	January 7, 1924
Minister of Justice	Baron Den Kenjirō	Independent	September 2, 1923	September 6, 1923
Minister of Justice	Hiranuma Kiichirō	Independent	September 6, 1923	January 7, 1924
Minister of Education	Inukai Tsuyoshi	Kakushin Club	September 2, 1923	September 6, 1923
Minister of Education	Okano Keijirō	Rikken Seiyūkai	September 6, 1923	January 7, 1924
Minister of Agriculture and Commerce	Baron Den Kenjirō	Independent	September 2, 1923	December 24, 1923
Minister of Agriculture and Commerce	Okano Keijirō	Rikken Seiyūkai	December 24, 1923	January 7, 1924
Minister of Communications	Inukai Tsuyoshi	Kakushin Club	September 2, 1923	January 7, 1924
Minister of Railways	Yamanouchi Kazutsugu	Independent	September 2, 1923	January 7, 1924
Chief Cabinet Secretary	Sukehide Kabayama	Independent	September 2, 1923	January 7, 1924
Director-General of the Cabinet Legislation Bureau	Eiichi Baba	Independent	September 2, 1923	September 19, 1923
Director-General of the Cabinet Legislation Bureau	Jōji Matsumoto	Independent	September 19, 1923	January 7, 1924
