= Kiyoshi Ikeda =

Japanese politician

- 池田 清
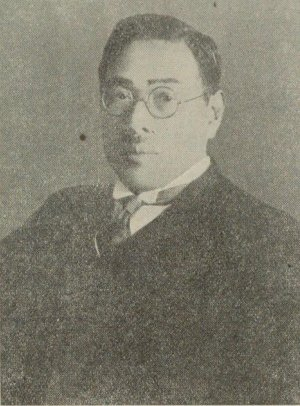
- Ikeda, before 1936

Member of the House of Representatives
- In office 1 October 1952 – 24 January 1955
- Preceded by: Kanbayashiyama Eikichi
- Succeeded by: Kanbayashiyama Eikichi
- Constituency: Kagoshima 1st

Member of the House of Peers
- In office 15 August 1945 – 30 August 1945 Nominated by the Emperor

Governor of Osaka Prefecture
- In office 1 August 1944 – 21 April 1945
- Monarch: Hirohito
- Preceded by: Kakichi Kawarada
- Succeeded by: Eiji Yasui
- In office 5 June 1937 – 5 September 1939
- Monarch: Hirohito
- Preceded by: Eiji Yasui
- Succeeded by: Kiyoshi Nakarai

Superintendent-General of the Metropolitan Police
- In office September 1939 – January 1940
- Preceded by: Gunzō Kayaba
- Succeeded by: Genki Abe

22nd Director-General of the Hokkaidō Agency
- In office 22 April 1936 – 5 June 1937
- Monarch: Hirohito
- Preceded by: Shin'ichi Sagami
- Succeeded by: Hidehiko Ishiguro

Personal details
- Born: 15 February 1885 Ei, Kagoshima, Japan
- Died: 13 January 1966 (aged 80)
- Resting place: Aoyama Cemetery
- Party: Liberal
- Education: Tokyo Imperial University

Kiyoshi Ikeda (池田 清, Ikeda Kiyoshi; 15 February 1885 – 13 January 1966) was a Japanese bureaucrat, police official, and politician. A career official of the Home Ministry, he served as the 22nd Director-General of the Hokkaidō Agency, Governor of Osaka Prefecture, Superintendent-General of the Metropolitan Police, and later as a member of both the House of Peers and the House of Representatives.

== Early life and education ==
Ikeda was born on 15 February 1885 in Kagoshima Prefecture. According to the Japan Center for Asian Historical Records, he graduated from the law faculty of Tokyo Imperial University in July 1913, specialising in German law, and passed the higher civil service examination in November of the same year.

== Career ==
After entering government service, Ikeda began his career in the Tokyo police. The JACAR career chart states that he entered office as a police inspector attached to the Kanda-Nishikichō police station, and later advanced through a series of police and Home Ministry posts. By the 1920s he had served in the Home Ministry's Shrine Bureau, first as a section chief and later as bureau director.

Ikeda later moved into colonial administration in Korea. JACAR identifies him as having become head of the Police Affairs Bureau of the Government-General of Chōsen in 1931, and academic work on shrine policy in colonial Korea notes his importance in the development of shrine-related policy and organisations during this period.

On 22 April 1936, Ikeda was appointed the 22nd Director-General of the Hokkaidō Agency. The official Hokkaido archive gives his tenure as lasting until 5 June 1937. He then became Governor of Osaka Prefecture in 1937. In September 1939 he became Superintendent-General of the Metropolitan Police; a photograph in the Shōwakan Digital Archive shows him in that office at a police inspection ceremony in Ueno on 30 October 1939.

During the Pacific War, Ikeda served in military-linked administrative office. JACAR states that from January 1942 he served as Naval Civil Administrator and Commander of the Hainan Naval Special District, and in August 1944 he was reappointed Governor of Osaka Prefecture. Later in 1945 he was appointed to the House of Peers, though his tenure there was brief; Shōwakan's index to the August–October 1945 Kanpō records his resignation from the chamber later that same month.

After the end of the Allied purge, Ikeda entered electoral politics. He was elected to the House of Representatives in 1952, and election records show that he was re-elected from Kagoshima 1st district in 1953 as a Liberal Party candidate before losing his seat at the 1955 general election.
