= Shin'ichi Sagami =

Japanese politician

- 佐上 信一
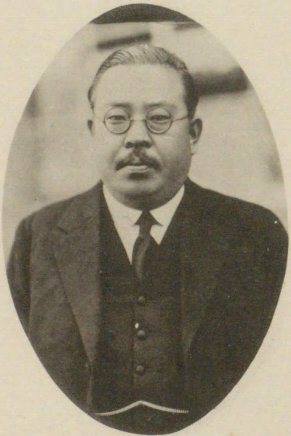
- Sagami, before 1931

21st Director-General of the Hokkaidō Agency
- In office 2 October 1931 – 22 April 1936
- Monarch: Hirohito
- Preceded by: Hideo Ikeda
- Succeeded by: Kiyoshi Ikeda

Governor of Kyoto Prefecture
- In office 5 July 1929 – 2 October 1931
- Monarch: Hirohito
- Preceded by: Shigeyoshi Ōmihara
- Succeeded by: Shinya Kurosaki

Governor of Nagasaki Prefecture
- In office 17 May 1927 – 25 May 1928
- Monarch: Hirohito
- Preceded by: Kyūichi Hasegawa
- Succeeded by: Kihachirō Itō

Governor of Okayama Prefecture
- In office 16 September 1925 – 12 May 1927
- Monarchs: Taishō; Hirohito
- Preceded by: Shigeyoshi Omihara
- Succeeded by: Masao Kishimoto

Personal details
- Born: 19 December 1882 Saeki, Hiroshima, Japan
- Died: 29 November 1943 (aged 60)
- Education: Tokyo Imperial University

Shin'ichi Sagami (佐上 信一, Sagami Shin'ichi; 19 December 1882 – 29 November 1943) was a Japanese Home Ministry bureaucrat who served as governor of Okayama Prefecture, Nagasaki Prefecture, and Kyoto Prefecture, and as the 21st Director-General of the Hokkaidō Agency.

== Early life and education ==
Sagami was born in Hiroshima Prefecture in 1882. Local historical material in Hokkaido states that he graduated from Tokyo Imperial University before entering the Home Ministry bureaucracy.

== Career ==
Before becoming a prefectural governor, Sagami served in the Home Ministry as a ministerial secretary and later as head of the Shrine Bureau. Scholarship on modern shrine policy also identifies him as director of the Shrine Bureau in 1924–1925.

He was appointed Governor of Okayama Prefecture on 16 September 1925 and left that office on 12 May 1927 when he transferred to Nagasaki. He then served as Governor of Nagasaki Prefecture from 1927 to 1928, before becoming director of the Local Affairs Bureau in the Home Ministry.

On 5 July 1929, Sagami became the 19th Governor of Kyoto Prefecture. Kyoto Prefecture's official history credits him with administering what was described as a “model budget”, providing relief during the economic depression, and resolving the long-pending annexation of Fushimi and 26 surrounding towns and villages into Kyoto City.

Sagami was appointed the 21st Director-General of the Hokkaidō Agency on 2 October 1931 and remained in office until 22 April 1936. Local histories describe his tenure as a difficult one, marked by major floods, poor harvests, and the 1934 Hakodate fire. He was particularly associated with efforts to promote agricultural rationalization and dairying in eastern Hokkaidō; local accounts credit him with supporting the five-year conversion toward dairy farming in Nakashibetsu and with involvement in the foundation of the school that later became Rakuno Gakuen.

== Personal life ==
The 1934 Teikoku Jinji Taikan lists Sagami's mother as Michi Nakai and his wife as Hiro Watanabe, the daughter of Watanabe Bunjirō of Niigata Prefecture. The same source records that the couple had several children, including their heir Masahiro.

Sagami died on 29 November 1943, aged 60.
