= Suetsugu =

Suetsugu (written: 末次 or 末續) is a Japanese surname. Notable people with the surname include:

- Nobumasa Suetsugu (末次 信正, 1880–1944), Imperial Japanese Navy admiral
- Shingo Suetsugu (末續 慎吾, born 1980), Japanese sprinter
- Toshimitsu Suetsugu (末次 利光, born 1942), Japanese baseball player
- Yuki Suetsugu (末次 由紀, born 1975), Japanese manga artist
