= Kakichi =

- Gender: Male

Origin
- Origin: Japanese
- Meaning: Different meanings depending on the kanji used

Kakichi (written: 稼吉, 嘉吉 or 佳吉) is a masculine Japanese given name. Notable people with the name include:

- Kakichi Kawarada (河原田 稼吉; 1886–1955), Japanese politician
- Kakichi Mitsukuri (箕作 佳吉; 1857–1909), Japanese zoologist
- Uchida Kakichi (内田 嘉吉; 1866–1933), Japanese politician and Governor-General of Taiwan
