= Kiyoura cabinet =

Cabinet of Japan (January 7 - June 11, 1924)

Kiyoura Cabinet
- 23rd Cabinet of Japan

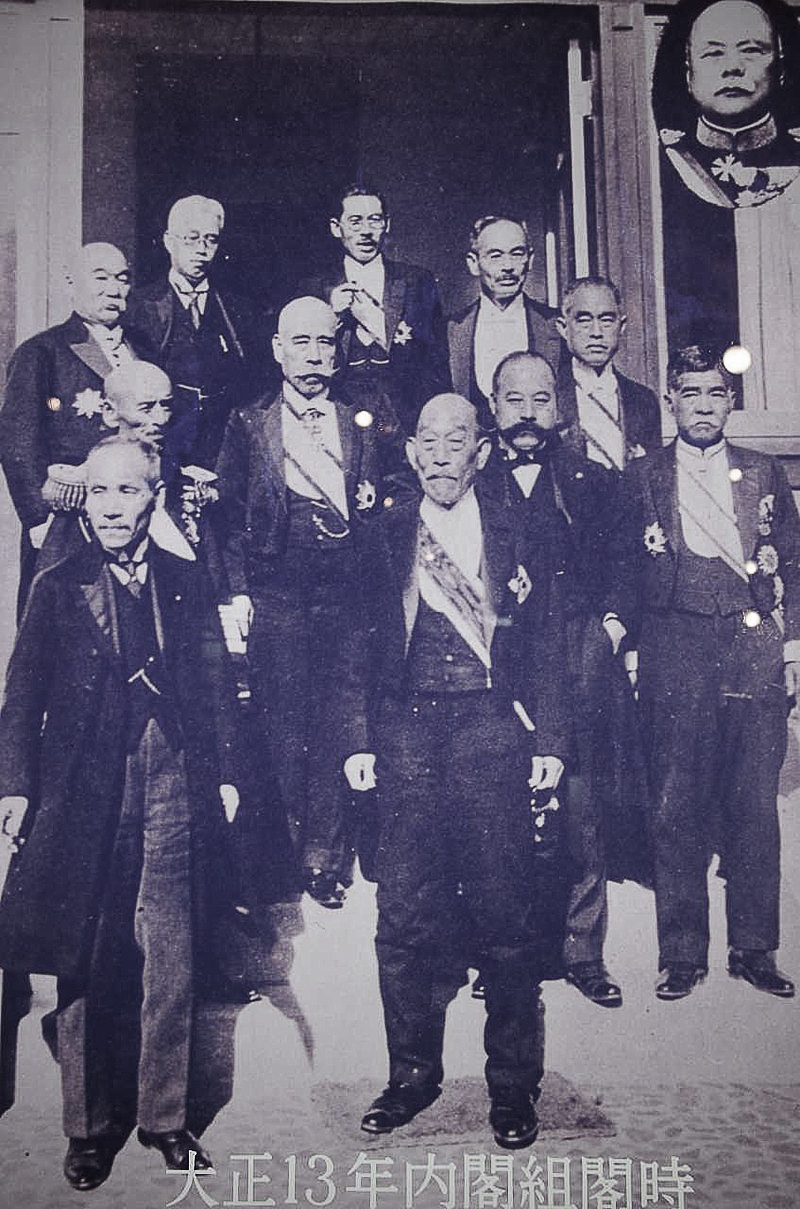
- Kiyoura Cabinet inauguration photo
- Date formed: January 7, 1924
- Date dissolved: June 11, 1924

People and organisations
- Emperor: Taishō
- Prime Minister: Kiyoura Keigo
- Status in legislature: Minority

History
- Election: 1924 general election
- Legislature terms: 48th Imperial Diet; 49th Imperial Diet
- Predecessor: Second Yamamoto Cabinet
- Successor: Katō Takaaki Cabinet

The Kiyoura Cabinet is the 23rd Cabinet of Japan led by Kiyoura Keigo from January 7, 1924 to June 11, 1924.

== Cabinet ==
Portfolio	Minister	Political party	Term start	Term end
Prime Minister	Viscount Kiyoura Keigo	Independent	January 7, 1924	June 11, 1924
Minister for Foreign Affairs	Baron Matsui Keishirō	Independent	January 7, 1924	June 11, 1924
Minister of Home Affairs	Mizuno Rentarō	Independent	January 7, 1924	June 11, 1924
Minister of Finance	Kazue Shōda	Independent	January 7, 1924	June 11, 1924
Minister of the Army	Kazushige Ugaki	Military (Army)	January 7, 1924	June 11, 1924
Minister of the Navy	Murakami Kakuichi	Military (Navy)	January 7, 1924	June 11, 1924
Minister of Justice	Suzuki Kisaburō	Independent	January 7, 1924	June 11, 1924
Minister of Education	Egi Kazuyuki	Independent	January 7, 1924	June 11, 1924
Minister of Agriculture and Commerce	Viscount Maeda Toshisada	Independent	January 7, 1924	June 11, 1924
Minister of Communications	Baron Fujimura Yoshirō	Independent	January 7, 1924	June 11, 1924
Minister of Railways	Komatsu Kenjirō	Independent	January 7, 1924	June 11, 1924
Chief Cabinet Secretary	Kobashi Ichita	Seiyūhontō	January 7, 1924	June 11, 1924
Director-General of the Cabinet Legislation Bureau	Matsumoto Jōji	Independent	January 7, 1924	January 10, 1924
Director-General of the Cabinet Legislation Bureau	Satake Sango	Independent	January 10, 1924	June 11, 1924
