= Kazue Shōda =

Japanese politician (1869–1948)

- 勝田 主計
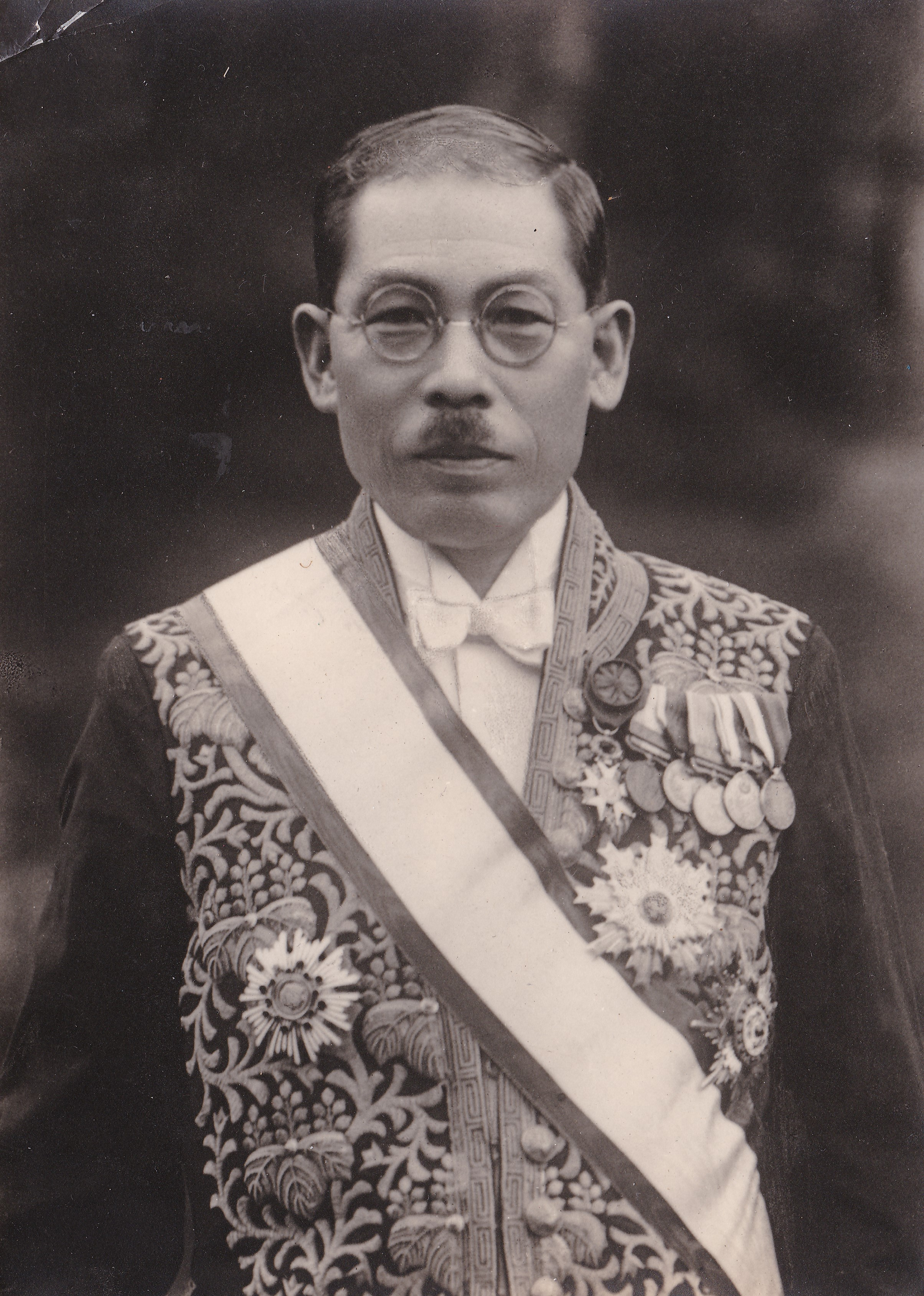

Minister of Education
- In office 25 May 1928 – 2 July 1929
- Prime Minister: Tanaka Giichi
- Preceded by: Mizuno Rentarō
- Succeeded by: Ichita Kobashi

Minister of Finance
- In office 7 January 1924 – 11 June 1924
- Prime Minister: Kiyoura Keigo
- Preceded by: Junnosuke Inoue
- Succeeded by: Hamaguchi Osachi
- In office 16 December 1916 – 29 September 1918
- Prime Minister: Terauchi Masatake
- Preceded by: Terauchi Masatake
- Succeeded by: Takahashi Korekiyo

President of the Bank of Chōsen
- In office 14 December 1915 – 9 October 1916
- Preceded by: Morihiro Ichihara
- Succeeded by: Shunkichi Minobe

Member of the House of Peers
- In office 31 March 1914 – 3 August 1946 Nominated by the Emperor

Personal details
- Born: 19 October 1869 Matsuyama, Ehime, Japan
- Died: 10 October 1948 (aged 78)
- Party: Independent
- Education: Tokyo Imperial University

Kazue Shōda (勝田 主計, Shōda Kazue; October 19, 1869 – October 10, 1948) was a Japanese statesman in the Meiji and Taishō periods.

== Biography ==
Shōda was born in Matsuyama Domain, Iyo Province on October 19, 1869, as the 5th son of a poor samurai. The poet Masaoka Shiki and admiral Akiyama Saneyuki were his friends from childhood. He graduated from Tokyo Imperial University in 1895, and obtained a position at the Ministry of Finance. In 1915, he rose to the position of president of the Bank of Chōsen. He was appointed Finance Minister under the Terauchi and Kiyoura Cabinets, and Education Minister under the Tanaka Giichi Cabinet. In 1938, he was considered for the post of Home Minister under the Second Konoe Cabinet, a somewhat surprising choice, given his age and lack of experience in the Home Ministry, and the nomination was rejected by Emperor Hirohito.

He died on October 10, 1948.

Political offices
Preceded by Terauchi Masatake	Finance Minister; 1916–1918	Succeeded by Korekiyo Takahashi
Preceded by Junnosuke Inoue	Finance Minister; 1924	Succeeded by Osachi Hamaguchi
Preceded by Mizuno Rentarō	Education Minister; 1924	Succeeded by Ichita Kobashi
