= Ichita Kobashi =

Japanese bureaucrat and politician (1870–1939)

- 小橋 一太
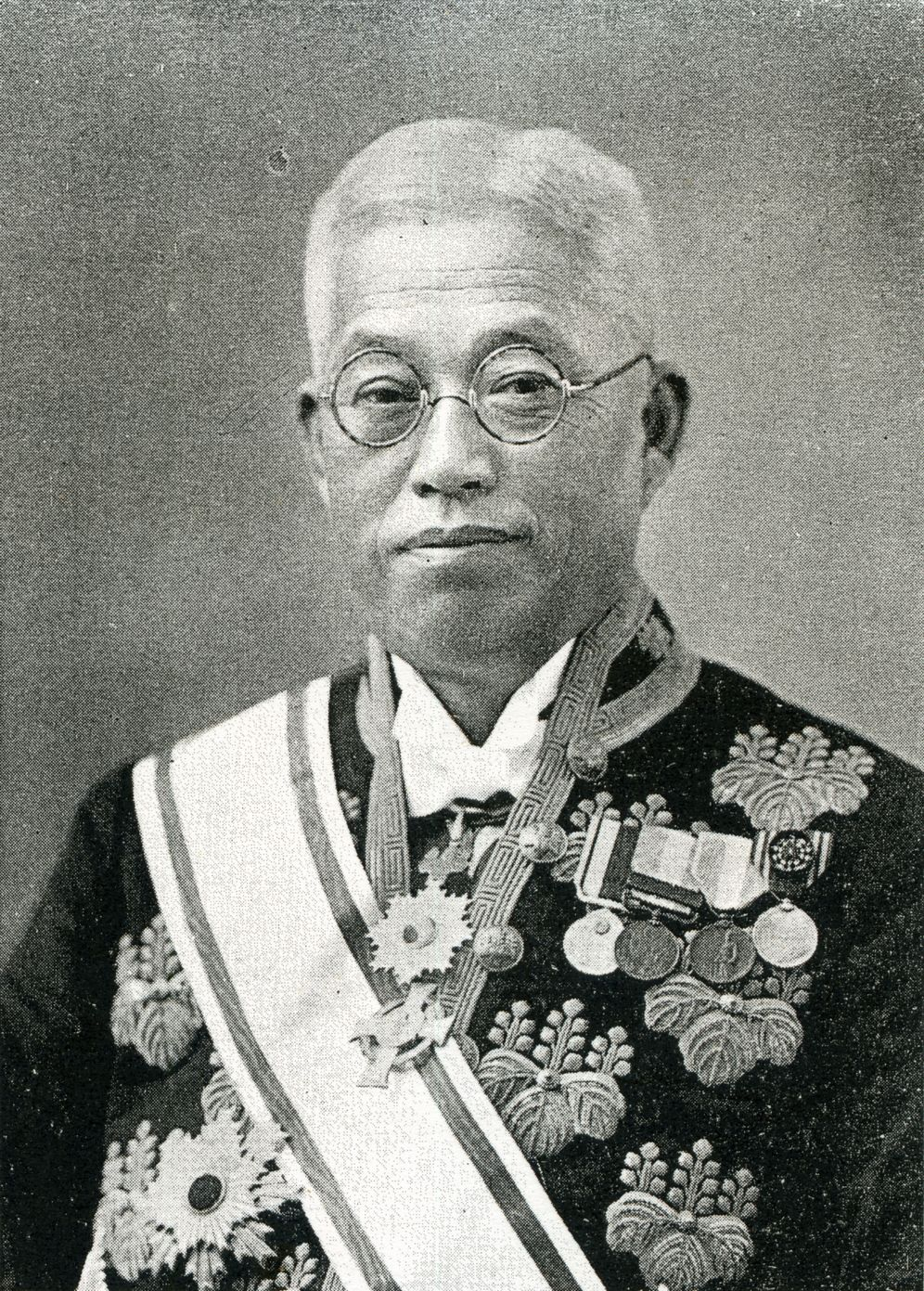
- Kobashi in 1929

Mayor of Tokyo
- In office 28 June 1937 – 14 April 1939
- Preceded by: Toratarō Ushizuka
- Succeeded by: Tanomogi Keikichi

Minister of Education
- In office 2 July 1929 – 29 November 1929
- Prime Minister: Hamaguchi Osachi
- Preceded by: Kazue Shōda
- Succeeded by: Tanaka Ryūzō

Chief Cabinet Secretary
- In office 7 January 1924 – 11 June 1924
- Prime Minister: Kiyoura Keigo
- Preceded by: Sukehide Kabayama
- Succeeded by: Tasuku Egi

Member of the House of Representatives
- In office 10 May 1920 – 21 January 1930
- Preceded by: Constituency established
- Succeeded by: Oyama Yoshiyuki
- Constituency: Kumamoto 1st (1920–1924); Kumamoto 4th (1924–1928); Kumamoto 1st (1928–1930)

Personal details
- Born: 25 October 1870 Kumamoto, Higo, Japan
- Died: 2 October 1939 (aged 68) Chigasaki, Kanagawa, Japan
- Resting place: Tama Cemetery
- Party: Rikken Minseitō (1927–1939)
- Other political affiliations: Rikken Seiyūkai (1920–1924); Seiyūhontō (1924–1927)
- Education: Tokyo Imperial University

Ichita Kobashi (小橋 一太; 25 October 1870 – 2 October 1939) was a Japanese bureaucrat and politician who served as the Minister of Education in 1929 and as the 16th mayor of Tokyo from 1937 to 1939.

== Early life ==
Kobashi was born in Kumamoto, Japan, on 25 October 1870 as the eldest son of Motoo Kobashi, a samurai in the Kumamoto Prefecture. He graduated from Law College of Tokyo Imperial University in 1898.

== Career ==
Following his graduation, Kobashi joined the Home Ministry and served as the director general of the Sanitary Affairs Bureau, director general of the Local Affairs Bureau, and director general of the Civil Engineering Bureau before finally assuming the post of Under-Secretary of Home Affairs on 25 April 1918. He became a member of the Rikken Seiyūkai and was elected to the House of Representatives in 1920, serving three consecutive terms.

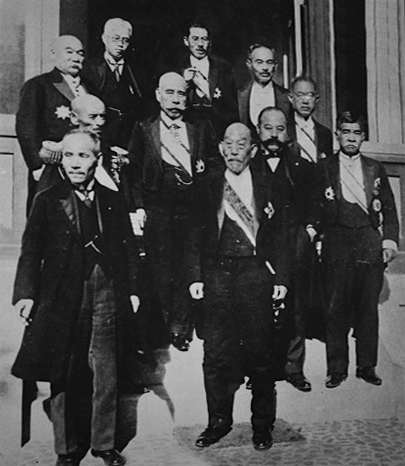
The Kiyoura Cabinet in 1924. Kobashi can be seen in the upper left.

Kobashi was appointed Chief Cabinet Secretary in the Kiyoura Cabinet on 7 January 1924 as a member of Seiyūhontō and held the position until the cabinet dissolved on 11 June 1924. Following his cabinet post in 1926, Kobashi served as the director of general affairs of the Seiyūhontō and as secretary general, before serving as the director of general affairs of the Rikken Minseitō in 1927.

Kobashi's second cabinet position came on 2 July 1929, when he was appointed as the Minister of Education in the Hamaguchi Cabinet. He resigned his position on 29 November 1929, following the Echigo Railway Scandal of which he was later acquitted. Kobashi was thereafter elected as the 16th Mayor of Tokyo on 28 June 1937. He held the position until his resignation on 14 April 1939.

== Later life ==
Kobashi died on 2 October 1939 in Chigasaki, three weeks shy of his 69th birthday. He was buried at Tama Cemetery and was posthumously awarded the Grand Cordon of the Order of the Rising Sun.

Political offices
Preceded by Kazue Shōda	38th Minister of Education; 1929	Succeeded by Tanaka Ryūzō
