= Kiyoshi Nakarai =

Japanese politician

- 半井 清
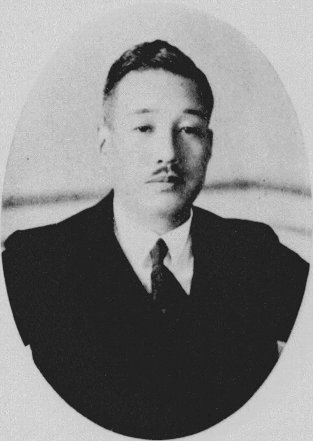
- Nakarai in 1935

Mayor of Yokohama
- In office 25 April 1959 – 22 April 1963
- Preceded by: Ryōzō Hiranuma
- Succeeded by: Kazuo Asukata
- In office 10 February 1941 – 30 November 1946
- Preceded by: Shūzō Aoki
- Succeeded by: Kyōichi Ishikawa
Gubernatorial offices
Governor of Osaka Prefecture
In office 5 September 1939 – 7 January 1941
Monarch	Hirohito
Preceded by	Kiyoshi Ikeda
Succeeded by	Chōji Minabe
24th Director-General of the Hokkaidō Agency
In office 23 December 1938 – 5 September 1939
Monarch	Hirohito
Preceded by	Hidehiko Ishiguro
Succeeded by	Kyuichirō Totsuka
Governor of Kanagawa Prefecture
In office 13 March 1936 – 23 December 1938
Monarch	Hirohito
Preceded by	Ishida Kaoru
Succeeded by	Seiichi Ōmura
Governor of Miyagi Prefecture
In office 10 July 1934 – 28 June 1935
Monarch	Hirohito
Preceded by	Tomoharu Akagi
Succeeded by	Ino Jirō
Governor of Tochigi Prefecture
In office 28 June 1932 – 10 July 1934
Monarch	Hirohito
Preceded by	Chōkichi Toyoshima
Succeeded by	Gunzō Kayaba
Governor of Miyazaki Prefecture
In office 18 December 1931 – 21 December 1931
Monarch	Hirohito
Preceded by	Minoru Ariyoshi
Succeeded by	Gisuke Kinoshita
Governor of Saga Prefecture
In office 20 January 1931 – 18 December 1931
Monarch	Hirohito
Preceded by	Ei Inoue
Succeeded by	Saburo Hayakawa

Personal details
- Born: 31 March 1888 Ochiai, Okayama, Japan
- Died: 3 September 1982 (aged 94)
- Resting place: Zenkō-ji
- Party: Liberal Democratic (1959)
- Education: Tokyo Imperial University

Kiyoshi Nakarai (半井 清, Nakarai Kiyoshi; 31 March 1888 – 3 September 1982) was a Japanese bureaucrat, colonial official, and politician. A career official of the Home Ministry, he served as Governor of Tochigi Prefecture, Miyagi Prefecture, Kanagawa Prefecture, and Osaka Prefecture, as the 24th Director-General of the Hokkaidō Agency, and twice as mayor of Yokohama.

== Early life and education ==
Nakarai was born on 31 March 1888. Official sources differ on his birthplace: the Hokkaido Government archive lists Tokyo as his place of origin, while Kotobank and Yokohama municipal material describe him as from Okayama or born in Okayama. He graduated from the German law faculty of Tokyo Imperial University and entered the Home Ministry in 1913.

== Career ==
Nakarai's early career included service in the Government-General of Chōsen.He served as chief of the Religious Affairs Section in the Education Bureau, and that he was involved in overseas explanatory activity connected with the post-1919 "cultural rule" period.

Before reaching the larger prefectural governorships, he served in a series of provincial posts.H was Governor of Tochigi from 28 June 1932 to 10 July 1934 and Governor of Miyagi from 10 July 1934 until 28 June 1935. He was also briefly appointed Governor of Miyazaki on 18 December 1931, lasting only 3 days to 21 December.

On 13 March 1936, Nakarai became Governor of Kanagawa Prefecture. During his tenure, his administration expanded Keihin Industrial Area, including a 1937 fisheries compensation agreement connected with coastal reclamation and industrial works in the Kawasaki area.

On 23 December 1938, he was appointed the 24th Director-General of the Hokkaidō Agency lasting until 5 September 1939. He then became Governor of Osaka Prefecture on 5 September 1939 which he held until 1941.

Nakarai left prefectural office in 1941 to become mayor of Yokohama running from 10 February 1941 tuntilo 30 November 1946.

After the war, Nakarai returned to the mayoralty through election. He was elected mayor on 23 April 1959 as the Liberal Democratic Party candidate, and served from 25 April 1959 to 22 April 1963. During this second administration the new Yokohama city hall was completed and opened in 1959.

After leaving the mayoralty Nakarai served as chairman of the Yokohama Chamber of Commerce and Industry, president of Keihin Real Estate, and chairman of Yokohama Shinkin Bank. He died on 3 September 1982.
