= Iwao Yamazaki =

Japanese lawyer, politician and cabinet minister

- 山崎 巌
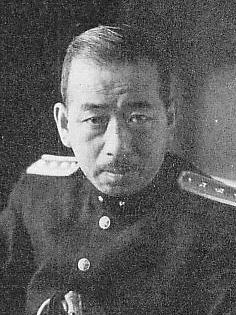

Minister for Home Affairs Chairman of the National Public Safety Commission
- In office 19 July 1960 – 13 October 1960
- Prime Minister: Hayato Ikeda
- Preceded by: Kanichiro Ishihara
- Succeeded by: Hideo Shuto

Minister of Home Affairs
- In office 17 August 1945 – 9 October 1945
- Prime Minister: Naruhiko Higashikuni
- Preceded by: Genki Abe
- Succeeded by: Zenjirō Horikiri

Member of the House of Representatives
- In office 1 October 1952 – 26 June 1968
- Preceded by: Kogi Tamotsu
- Succeeded by: Heihachirō Yamazaki
- Constituency: Fukuoka 3rd

Governor of Shizuoka Prefecture
- In office 9 November 1938 – 17 April 1939
- Monarch: Hirohito
- Preceded by: Ichisho Inuma
- Succeeded by: Hachiya Obama

Personal details
- Born: 16 September 1894 Ōkawa, Fukuoka, Japan
- Died: 26 June 1968 (aged 73)
- Party: Liberal Democratic (1955–1968)
- Other political affiliations: Liberal (1952–1955)
- Relatives: Tatsunosuke Yamazaki (brother); Chūichi Ariyoshi (father-in-law)
- Education: Tokyo Imperial University

Iwao Yamazaki (山崎巌, Yamazaki Iwao; 16 September 1894 – 26 June 1968) was a lawyer, politician and cabinet minister in the early Shōwa period of Japan. His brother, Tatsunosuke Yamazaki was also a politician and cabinet minister, and his nephew Heihachiro Yamazaki was later a prominent member of the post-war Liberal-Democratic Party.

== Biography ==
Yamazaki was born in Ōkawa, Fukuoka. After his graduation in 1918 from the law school of Tokyo Imperial University, he entered the Home Ministry. He subsequently transferred to the Ministry of Health, rising to the post of Director of Social Services. In 1938, he was appointed Governor of Shizuoka Prefecture. He subsequently returned to the Home Ministry, and was Director of Public Works, followed by Director of Public Safety. In 1940, succeeded Genki Abe as Superintendent-General of the Tokyo Metropolitan Police, the highest-ranking office in the police administration. From 1942-1943, he served as Deputy Home Minister under the Tōjō Cabinet, and also from 1944-1945 under the Kantarō Suzuki Cabinet. In mid-1944, he was assigned as civilian administrator of Japanese-occupied Borneo, where he encouraged a policy of Japanization of the local inhabitants through education to bolster support for Imperial Japan’s war efforts.

Following the surrender of Japan, Yamazaki was appointed Home Minister under the Higashikuni Cabinet. During his tenure, he attempted to ban publication of a photograph Emperor Hirohito taken together with General Douglas MacArthur, on the grounds that this was demeaning to the imperial dignity. This action drew the wrath of the occupation authorities, who were attempting to portray Hirohito in more “human” terms.

He also strongly opposed the decision by the occupation authorities to release political prisoners held under the Peace Preservation Laws, stating in an interview with the Japan Times newspaper on 4 October 1945 that anyone advocating any changes in the present political structure, of the status of the Emperor was a communist who should be arrested.

He resigned together with the rest of the cabinet in protest of the repeal of the Peace Preservation Laws on 9 October 1945 and was immediately placed on the purged list of those banned from holding government office.

Following the end of the occupation, Yamazaki was elected to a seat lower house of the Diet of Japan in the 1952 General Election under the Liberal Party. During the debate over the adoption of the post-war Constitution of Japan, he publicly speculated that it might be better for Japan to become a protectorate of the United States.

Yamazaki was associated with the politically conservative wing of the party after it became the Liberal Democratic Party and was a leading member of the faction led by Mitsujiro Ishii. He served as chairman of the budgetary committee in 1957. In 1960, he was appointed to the cabinet of Prime Minister Hayato Ikeda as Minister of Home Affairs. Yamazaki also served as Chairman of the National Public Safety Commission. He was forced to resign in the aftermath of the assassination of Inejiro Asanuma, president of the Japan Socialist Party during a televised speech.

Yamazaki retired thereafter from public life, and died in 1968 at the age of 73.

== Notes ==
Preceded by Kanichirō Ishihara	Minister for Home Affairs; 1960	Succeeded by Hideo Sutō
Preceded by Kanichirō Ishihara	Chairman of the National Public Safety Commission; 1960	Succeeded by Hideo Sutō
Preceded by Genki Abe	Minister of Home Affairs; 1945	Succeeded by Zenjirō Horikiri
Preceded by Toshiki Karasawa	Vice Minister of Home Affairs; 1944–1945	Succeeded by Hirokichi Nadao
Preceded by Michio Yuzawa	Vice Minister of Home Affairs; 1942–1943	Succeeded by Toshiki Karasawa
