= Kōichi Kido =

Japanese statesman (1889–1977)

Marquess Kōichi Kido
- 木戸 幸一
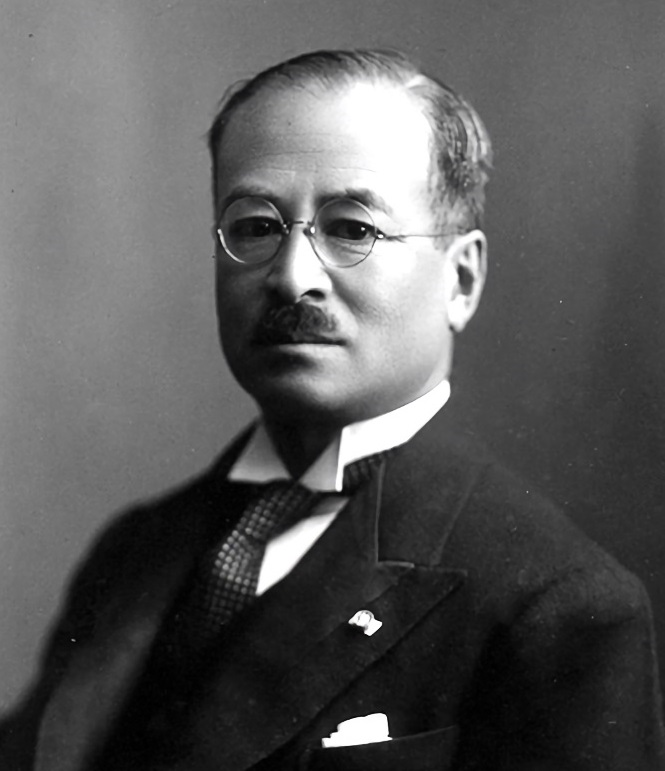
- Kido, c. 1940

Lord Keeper of the Privy Seal
- In office June 1, 1940 – November 24, 1945
- Monarch: Hirohito
- Preceded by: Yuasa Kurahei
- Succeeded by: Hisanori Fujita

Minister of Home Affairs
- In office January 5, 1939 – August 30, 1939
- Prime Minister: Hiranuma Kiichirō
- Preceded by: Suetsugu Nobumasa
- Succeeded by: Naoshi Ohara

Minister of Health and Welfare
- In office January 11, 1938 – January 5, 1939
- Prime Minister: Fumimaro Konoe
- Preceded by: Office established
- Succeeded by: Hisatada Hirose

Minister of Education
- In office October 22, 1937 – May 26, 1938
- Prime Minister: Fumimaro Konoe
- Preceded by: Eiji Yasui
- Succeeded by: Sadao Araki

Member of the House of Peers
- In office August 30, 1917 – December 27, 1945 Hereditary peerage

Personal details
- Born: July 18, 1889 Akasaka, Tokyo, Japan
- Died: April 6, 1977 (aged 87) Tokyo, Japan
- Cause of death: Cirrhosis
- Resting place: Tama Cemetery, Tokyo
- Spouse: Kodama Tsuruko
- Relations: Kido Takayoshi (granduncle)
- Children: 2 sons, 1 daughter
- Parents: Takamasa Kido (father); Sueko Yamao (mother)
- Education: Kyoto Imperial University

Marquess Kōichi Kido (木戸 幸一, Kido Kōichi; July 18, 1889 – April 6, 1977) was a Japanese statesman who served as Lord Keeper of the Privy Seal of Japan from 1940 to 1945, and was the closest advisor to emperor Hirohito throughout World War II. He was convicted of war crimes and sentenced to life imprisonment, of which he served 6 years before being released in 1953.

== Early life ==
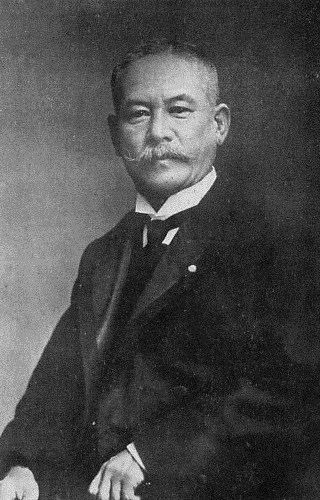
Takamasa Kido, father of Kōichi Kido

Kōichi Kido was born on July 18, 1889, in Akasaka, Tokyo to Marquess Takamasa Kido and Sueko Yamao. He was the grand-nephew of Kido Takayoshi, one of the leaders of the Meiji Restoration. After graduating from the Gakushuin Peer's School in Tokyo, he went to the law school of Kyoto University, where Marxist economist Hajime Kawakami was one of his professors. After graduation in 1915, he held numerous minor bureaucratic posts in the Ministry of Agriculture and Commerce, followed by the Ministry of Commerce and Industry. Together with Shinji Yoshino and Nobusuke Kishi, he was one of the architects of the Strategic Industries Control Act on 1931, which set the stage for state control of numerous industries during the increasing militarization of Japan in the 1930s. Kido became chief secretary of the Home Ministry in 1930.

== Political career ==
When his long-time friend Fumimaro Konoe became Prime Minister of Japan in 1937, Kido was named Minister of Education. From January 1938, he concurrently held the post of Minister of Health and Welfare. In January 1939, Kido was appointed Home Minister in the Hiranuma Cabinet. As Lord Keeper of the Privy Seal of Japan from 1940, Kido became one of the most influential advisors to emperor Hirohito following the death of Saionji Kinmochi. He recommended to Hirohito that Konoe succeed Mitsumasa Yonai for a second term as Prime Minister of Japan and was active with Konoe in the movement to replace the existing political parties with the Taisei Yokusankai (Imperial Rule Assistance Association) to form a single party state.

In 1941, Kido recommended that Hideki Tōjō become Prime Minister after Konoe's third term in office, as being one of the few people eligible who might be able to maintain control over more radical elements within the Imperial Japanese Army. However, Kido remained one of the more cautious advisors to Hirohito at the beginning of World War II, and is known to have advised the emperor against attacking the Dutch East Indies in 1941, explaining that such an attack might provoke the United States into war, and that any oil obtained by taking the East Indies would still have to be transported, and would be subject to blockades and attacks by plane and submarine. Kido also claimed after the war that Hirohito was never aware of the plans to attack Pearl Harbor until after the attack occurred. As the war situation deteriorated for Japan, Kido was one of the chief advocates of a negotiated peace, and Kido is generally credited with convincing the government to accept the Potsdam Declaration and surrender. He also convinced the emperor that it would be necessary to deliver a personal speech in order to ensure that all civilians and soldiers would cease fighting. He was one of the principal targets for assassination during the Kyūjō Incident in the final days of the war.

== Post-war period ==
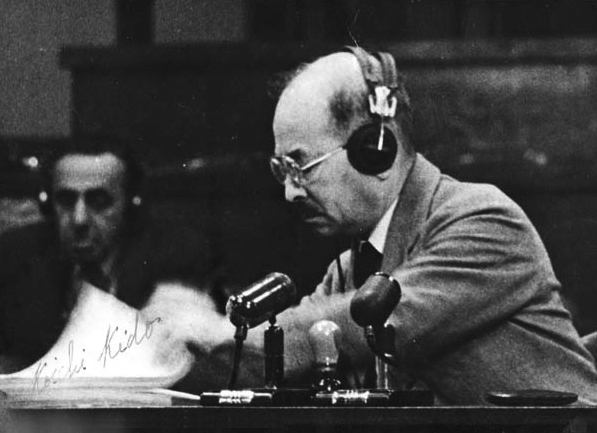
Kido at the Tokyo Tribunal, 1947

Kido was not only the chief advisor to the emperor; he was a major liaison between the emperor and the government, and a representative of the Japanese government to the Allied Occupation Forces. He advised General MacArthur on many aspects of the logistics surrounding the surrender, the end of the war, and the Occupation of Japan. One of his chief motives was consistently to protect the honor of the emperor.

In the International Military Tribunal for the Far East held in Tokyo after the war, Kido was charged as a Class A War Criminal. He initially attempted to plead guilty in order to protect the emperor by taking all responsibility for imperial decisions advocating war unto himself. His personal diary, kept in detail since 1930, was voluntarily turned over to the prosecution, and became an important document in determining the internal workings of the Japanese government during the war and was often cited by the prosecution as evidence against the defendants, including Kido himself. Kido was found guilty of Counts 1, 27, 29, 31, and 32, and was sentenced to life imprisonment in Sugamo Prison, Tokyo.

In 1951, as the Occupation of Japan was ending, Kido sent a message to the emperor, advising him as he had advised three years earlier, to accept responsibility for the defeat and abdicate, at the end of the American Occupation. In addition, Kido opposed the idea of continuing to punish war criminals under Japanese law after the end of the American Occupation. According to his diary, "those called war criminals by the enemy's standards, especially those in responsible positions, were all performing loyal duties, and to punish them in the name of the emperor would be unbearable".

In 1953, due to health problems, Kido was released from prison. He lived the rest of his life in Oiso, Kanagawa Prefecture and had a flat in Tokyo's Aoyama. He died at age 87 of cirrhosis of the liver at the Imperial Household Agency hospital in Tokyo in 1977. His grave is at the Tama Cemetery in Tokyo. Kido was married to Kodama Tsuruko, the daughter of General Kodama Gentaro. He had two sons and one daughter.

== Cabinet positions ==
Political offices
Preceded by Eiji Yasui	Minister of Education; October 22, 1937 – May 26, 1938	Succeeded by Sadao Araki
Preceded by -none-	Minister of Health and Welfare; January 11, 1938 – January 5, 1939	Succeeded by Hisatada Hirose
Preceded by Nobumasa Suetsugu	Minister of Home Affairs; January 5 – August 30, 1939	Succeeded by Naoshi Ohara
