= Kawasaki Takukichi =

Japanese politician

- 川崎 卓吉
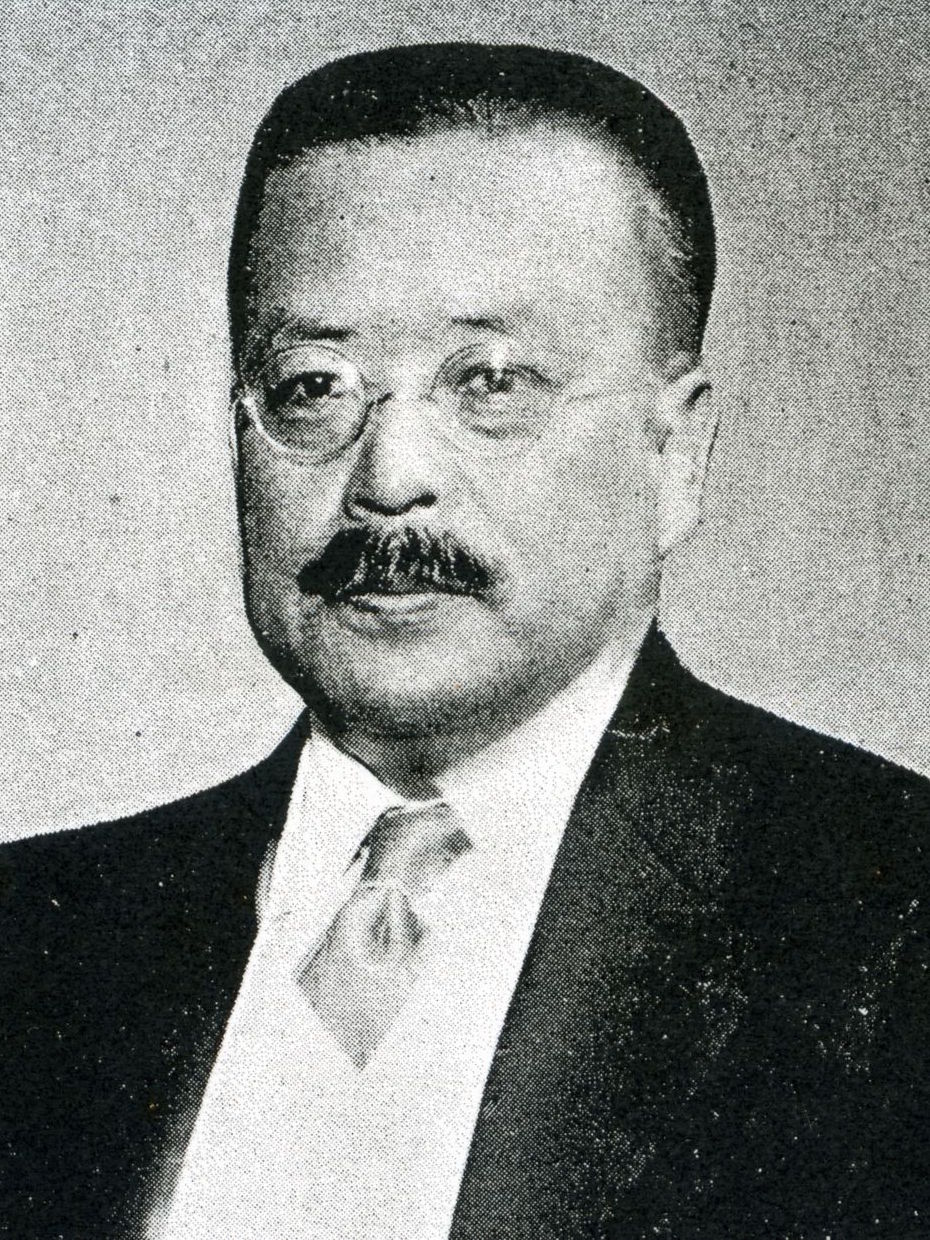
- Kawasaki in 1929

Minister of Commerce and Industry
- In office 9 March 1936 – 27 March 1936
- Prime Minister: Kōki Hirota
- Preceded by: Machida Chūji
- Succeeded by: Gōtarō Ogawa

Minister of Education
- In office 2 February 1936 – 9 March 1936
- Prime Minister: Keisuke Okada
- Preceded by: Genji Matsuda
- Succeeded by: Shigenosuke Ushio (acting); Hirao Hachisaburō

Chief Cabinet Secretary
- In office 14 April 1931 – 13 December 1931
- Prime Minister: Wakatsuki Reijirō
- Preceded by: Fujiya Suzuki
- Succeeded by: Kaku Mori

Director-General of the Legislative Bureau
- In office 3 July 1929 – 14 April 1931
- Prime Minister: Hamaguchi Osachi; Kijūrō Shidehara (acting); Hamaguchi Osachi
- Preceded by: Yonezō Maeda
- Succeeded by: Takeuchi Sakuhei

Member of the House of Peers
- In office 29 January 1926 – 27 March 1936 Nominated by the Emperor

Mayor of Nagoya
- In office 1 April 1922 – 11 June 1924
- Preceded by: Toranosuke Okita
- Succeeded by: Sensuke Tachika

Governor of Fukushima Prefecture
- In office 28 April 1916 – 28 June 1919
- Monarch: Taishō
- Preceded by: Sukeharu Horiguchi
- Succeeded by: Mitsuo Miyata

Personal details
- Born: 8 March 1871 Kure, Hiroshima, Japan
- Died: 27 March 1936 (aged 65)
- Resting place: Aoyama Cemetery
- Party: Rikken Minseitō (1927–1936)
- Other political affiliations: Independent (1916–1926); Kenseikai (1926–1927)
- Education: Tokyo Imperial University

Takukichi Kawasaki (川崎卓吉, Kawasaki Takukichi; 8 March 1871 – 27 March 1936) was a politician and cabinet minister in the pre-war Empire of Japan.

== Biography ==
Kawasaki was born in what is now part of the city of Kure, Hiroshima as the second son of a local doctor. He graduated from Tokyo Imperial University’s Law School, continuing on to do post-graduate research in comparative political systems before obtaining a post at the Home Ministry. In 1916, he was appointed Governor of Fukushima Prefecture, and in 1919 was sent to Taiwan as Director-General for Home Affairs, and subsequently Director-General for Agriculture and Commerce. In 1922, Kawasaki was appointed mayor of Nagoya. Under his administration, the Yagoto Baseball Ground was built, and the first Japanese High School Baseball Invitational Tournament was held in 1924.

Later in 1924, Kawasaki was recalled to Tokyo to assume the post of Director-General of the National Police Agency under the Home Ministry. He became Deputy Home Minister in 1925. In 1926, he was invited to take a seat in the House of Peers in the Diet of Japan. He was recruited by Osachi Hamaguchi and Wakatsuki Reijirō to join the Kenseikai political party, and in 1927 joined the Rikken Minseitō.

In 1929, Kawasaki served in the Hamaguchi administration as Director-General of the Cabinet Legislation Bureau. In 1931, he served in the second Wakatsuki administration as Chief Cabinet Secretary . He was outspoken against the growing influence of fascism in Japan. In 1935, he became the leader of the Minseitō party.

Kawasaki was then picked to become Minister of Education by Prime Minister Keisuke Okada on February 1, 1936. However, the cabinet was forced to resign only a few weeks later due to the February 26 Incident. Prime Minister Kōki Hirota then asked that Kawasaki accept the post of Home Minister. This choice was opposed by the Imperial Japanese Army, who wanted control over that powerful ministry, and Kawasaki was sidelined to become Minister of Commerce and Industry. However, Kawasaki died before his formal investiture ceremony could even take place.

== Notes ==
Political offices
Preceded by Chūji Matsuda	Minister of Commerce and Industry; 9 Mar 1936 – 27 Mar 1939	Succeeded by Gōtarō Ogawa
Preceded by Genji Matsuda	Minister of Education; 2 Feb 1936 – 9 Mar 1936	Succeeded by Shigenosuke Ushio
