= Eiichi Baba =

Japanese politician

- 馬場 鍈一
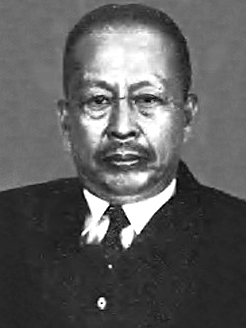

Minister of Home Affairs
- In office 4 June 1937 – 14 December 1937
- Prime Minister: Fumimaro Konoe
- Preceded by: Kakichi Kawarada
- Succeeded by: Suetsugu Nobumasa

Minister of Finance
- In office 9 March 1936 – 2 February 1937
- Prime Minister: Kōki Hirota
- Preceded by: Machida Chūji
- Succeeded by: Toyotarō Yūki

Governor of the Nippon Kangyo Bank
- In office 7 October 1927 – 9 March 1936
- Preceded by: Nakaji Kajiwara
- Succeeded by: Mitsuo Ishii

Director-General of the Legislative Bureau
- In office 28 March 1922 – 19 March 1923
- Prime Minister: Takahashi Korekiyo; Katō Tomosaburō
- Preceded by: Sennosuke Yokota
- Succeeded by: Jōji Matsumoto

Member of the House of Peers
- In office 19 December 1922 – 21 December 1937 Nominated by the Emperor

Personal details
- Born: 5 October 1879 Minato, Tokyo, Japan
- Died: 21 December 1937 (aged 58) Minato, Tokyo, Japan
- Party: Independent
- Education: Tokyo Imperial University

Eiichi Baba (馬場 鍈一, Baba Eiichi; 5 October 1879 – 21 December 1937) was a bureaucrat and cabinet minister in early Shōwa period Japan.

== Biography ==
Baba was born in what is now Minato, Tokyo as Eiichi Yamamoto, the son of an impoverished former samurai. He was adopted by Baba Ken, a railway engineer and took his surname. He graduated from the law school of Tokyo Imperial University, where one of his classmates was Gōtarō Ogawa and entered the Finance Ministry. He served in various posts within the ministry, including Director of the Yokohama Customs Office, Director of Accounts with the Japanese Resident-General of Korea, and from 1907 was with the Cabinet Legislation Bureau, rising to the position of Director-General of the Cabinet Legislation Bureau under the Takahashi administration in 1922. The following year, he was appointed to a seat in the House of Peers, where he became noted for his ability to arrange for compromise between the political factions and parties. The Rikken Seiyūkai party arranged for Baba to become president of the Nippon Kangyo Bank in 1927. His continued in this post to 1936, and was noted for his efforts to improve on rural finances.

Baba returned to the government in 1936 as Finance Minister under the administration of Prime Minister Kōki Hirota. In the aftermath of the February 26 Incident, reformists in the Cabinet Legislation Bureau and a faction within the Imperial Japanese Army led by Colonel Kanji Ishiwara pushed forward a sweeping reform plan calling for a massive reorganization of Japanese society by the nationalization and amalgamation of key industries and the streamlining of government agencies to form a “national defense state”. Baba, who had previously been known for his advocacy of a balanced budget, wholeheartedly supported the reform plan with an unprecedentedly large budget, with spending increases of up to 40 percent over the previous year. The increased spending was to be supported by increased taxes and increased public debt. The immediate result was inflation and a negative balance of payments due to increased imports of raw materials. In January 1937, the Hirota cabinet collapsed. The following Hayashi administration attempted to reign in the excesses of Baba’s budget, but with limited success.

Under the first Konoe administration, Baba was appointed Home Minister, partly at the insistence of the Imperial Japanese Army and supporters of the “national defense state” plan, who had demanded his reinstatement as Minister of Finance. Even this compromise measure diminished Konoe’s popularity with the civilian and business community and led to some resignations within his administration, without completely mollifying the Army, who then pushed for Baba to be given the post of Director of the Cabinet Planning Board as well. However, Baba died on 21 December of the same year of a myocardial infarction.

== Notes ==
Political offices
Preceded by Machida Chūji (interim)	Minister of Finance; 9 March 1936 – 2 February 1937	Succeeded by Toyotarō Yūki
Preceded by Kakichi Kawarada	Minister of Home Affairs; 4 June 1937 – 14 December 1937	Succeeded by Nobumasa Suetsugu
