= Shōzō Murata =

Japanese businessman, politician, diplomat

- 村田 省蔵
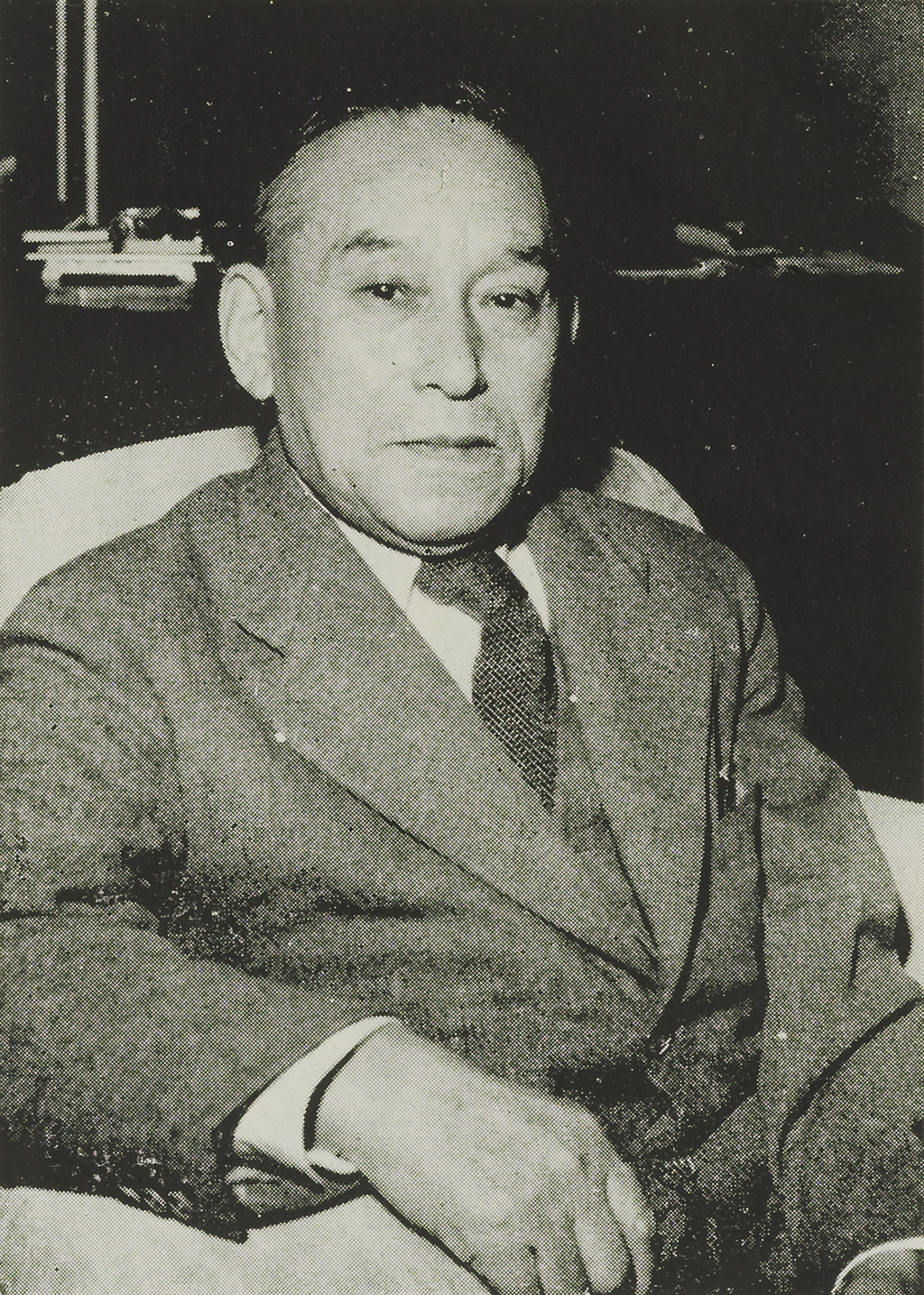
- Murata in 1953

Minister of Communications
- In office 22 July 1940 – 18 October 1941
- Prime Minister: Fumimaro Konoe
- Preceded by: Masanori Katsu
- Succeeded by: Ken Terajima

Minister of Railways
- In office 18 July 1941 – 18 October 1941
- Prime Minister: Fumimaro Konoe
- Preceded by: Gōtarō Ogawa
- Succeeded by: Ken Terajima
- In office 22 July 1940 – 28 September 1940
- Prime Minister: Fumimaro Konoe
- Preceded by: Tsuruhei Matsuno
- Succeeded by: Gōtarō Ogawa

Member of the House of Peers
- In office 4 January 1939 – 3 December 1945 Nominated by the Emperor

Personal details
- Born: 6 September 1878 Tokyo, Japan
- Died: 15 March 1957 (aged 78) Tokyo, Japan
- Party: Independent
- Education: Tokyo Higher Commerce School

Shōzō Murata (村田 省蔵, Murata Shōzō; 6 September 1878 – 15 March 1957) was a Japanese entrepreneur, cabinet minister and diplomat before, during and after World War II.

== Biography ==
Murata was a native of Tokyo and a graduated the Tokyo Higher Commerce School (now Hitotsubashi University) in 1900. There he was friends with Shinji Tazaki, a commerce scholar who was awarded Senior Third Rank, the First Order of Merit. After graduation, he went to work with the Osaka Shosen Kaisha (currently Mitsui O.S.K. Lines), and transformed the relatively small company into a major shipping company. He was sent to the company’s branch in Shanghai in 1901 at the age of 24. and eventually rose to the position of company president from 1934–1940. In 1937, in response to increasing demands from the Japanese military for resources from the Japanese merchant fleet, Murata organized an Autonomous Shipping Control Group (海運自治連盟, Kaiun Jichi Renmei), of which he served as chairman, to reduce competition and coordinate efforts between the seven largest shipping companies and the government.

In 1939, Murata was appointed to the House of Peers in the Diet of Japan. Murata was representative of successful private entrepreneurs who were invited to join the Taisei Yokusankai political organization created by Fumimaro Konoe and his followers, and took active participation in debate on the state socialist controlled economy created under the National Mobilization Law.

Murata was invited to become both Minister of Communications and Minister of Railways under the 3rd and 4th Konoe administrations from 1940. In 1943, Murata became Japanese ambassador to the Second Philippine Republic, and special advisor to the Japanese Fourteenth Area Army of the Imperial Japanese Army. As ambassador he brought a team of scholars from Japan to make a research report with recommendations for the collaborationist government, told President José Laurel that the Philippines had the right to make more demands upon the Japanese government; however, his report and efforts were ignored by the Japanese military. He was recalled to Japan in 1945.

In 1946, along with all members of the wartime Japanese government, Murata was purged from public office and was taken into custody by the American occupation authorities and held at Sugamo Prison, where he was to be charged for war crimes. However, he was released without ever being formally charged.

In 1951, Murata became a special advisor to the Foreign Ministry. He also appointed special ambassador to the Philippines in 1954, and worked towards normalization of relations and settlement of war-time compensation claims. In the post-war period, Murata was president of the Japan Association for the Promotion of International Trade (JAPIT), and a number of other charity associations. He also worked towards the restoration of diplomatic relations between China and Japan, visiting Beijing in 1952, and meeting with Zhou Enlai in 1955 in China and signing a trade agreement.

== Notes ==
Political offices
Preceded by Masanori Katsu	Minister of Communications; 22 July 1940 – 18 October 1941	Succeeded by Ken Terajima
Preceded by Tsuruhei Matsuno	Railroad Minister; 22 July – 28 September 1940	Succeeded by Gōtarō Ogawa
Preceded by Gōtarō Ogawa	Railroad Minister; 18 October – 2 December 1941	Succeeded by Ken Terajima
Diplomatic posts
Preceded by Position established	Ambassador of Japan to the Philippines; 1943 – 1945	Succeeded by Tōru Nakagawa
