= Sukehide Kabayama =

Japanese politician (1868–1941)

- 樺山 資英
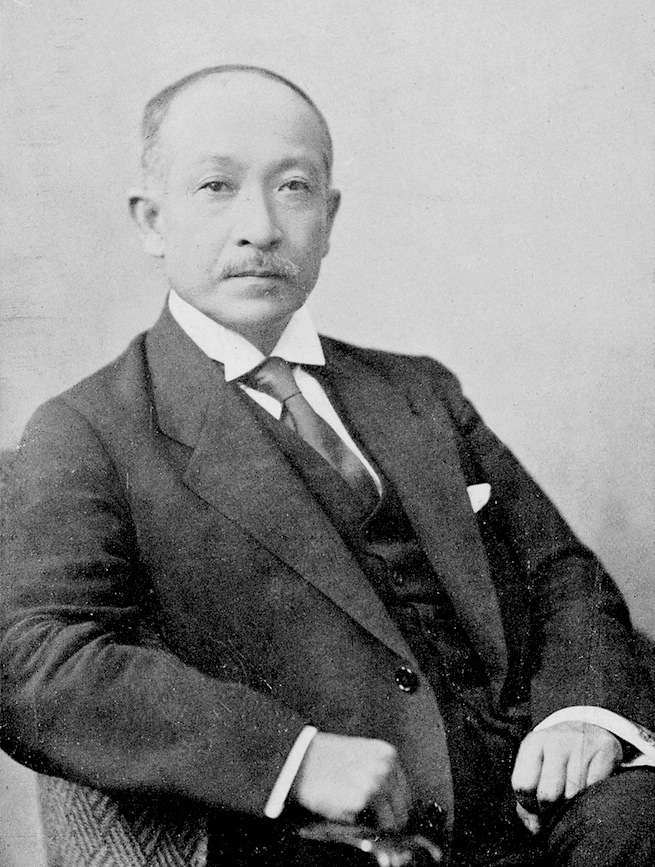
- Sukehide Kabayama

Chief Cabinet Secretary
- In office 2 September 1963 – 7 January 1924
- Prime Minister: Yamamoto Gonnohyōe
- Preceded by: Mitsuo Miyata
- Succeeded by: Ichita Kobashi

Member of the House of Peers
- In office 2 January 1924 – 19 March 1941 Nominated by the Emperor

Personal details
- Born: 1 January 1869 Kagoshima, Satsuma, Japan
- Died: 19 March 1941 (aged 72)
- Resting place: Aoyama Cemetery
- Party: Independent
- Education: Tokyo First Middle School
- Alma mater: Columbia University; Yale University

Sukehide Kabayama (樺山 資英, Kabayama Sukehide; 1 January 1868 – 19 March 1941) was a Japanese government official and businessman.

== Career ==
Kabayama received a doctorate in civil law from Yale University in 1893. He was later the Chief of the Cabinet Secretariat of the Second Yamamoto Cabinet (1923–1924). He became a member of the House of Peers in 1924.
