= Shigenosuke Ushio =

Japanese bureaucrat and cabinet minister

- 潮 恵之輔
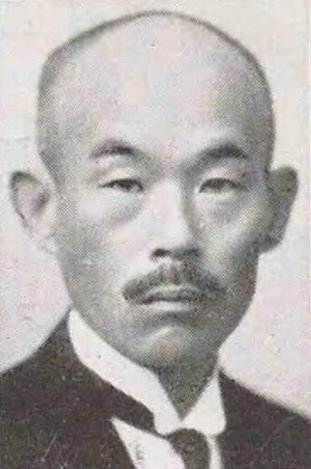
- Ushio in 1937

Vice President of the Privy Council
- In office 13 June 1946 – 2 May 1947
- Monarch: Hirohito
- President: Tōru Shimizu
- Preceded by: Tōru Shimizu
- Succeeded by: Office abolished

Minister of Home Affairs
- In office 9 March 1936 – 2 February 1937
- Prime Minister: Kōki Hirota
- Preceded by: Fumio Gotō
- Succeeded by: Kakichi Kawarada

Minister of Education
- In office 9 March 1936 – 25 March 1936
- Prime Minister: Kōki Hirota
- Preceded by: Kawasaki Takukichi
- Succeeded by: Hirao Hachisaburō

Member of the Privy Council
- In office 6 December 1938 – 13 June 1946
- Monarch: Hirohito

Member of the House of Peers
- In office 7 August 1931 – 9 December 1938 Nominated by the Emperor

Personal details
- Born: 11 August 1881 Mino, Shimane, Japan
- Died: 9 January 1955 (aged 73) Jiyūgaoka, Tokyo, Japan
- Resting place: Zenpuku-ji
- Education: Tokyo Imperial University

Shigenosuke Ushio (潮 恵之輔, Ushio Shigenosuke; 11 August 1881 – 9 January 1955) was a bureaucrat and cabinet minister in early Shōwa period Japan.

== Biography ==
Ushio was born in Shimane Prefecture. After his graduation in 1907 from the law school of Tokyo Imperial University with a major in constitutional law, he entered the Home Ministry. He rose rapidly within the ministry, serving as Bureau Director for Health and Welfare, and Bureau Director for Local Affairs. In 1928, he became Vice-Minister. In 1931, he was appointed under-secretary for the House of Peers. In 1932, he returned to the Home Ministry as Vice-Minister, overseeing civil service appointment reforms, and enforcement of laws aimed at reducing election fraud issues.

He was appointed simultaneously Home Minister and interim Education Minister in 1935 under the Kōki Hirota administration. Ushio was selected for his opposition to the military, lack of political party ties and noted strength at bureaucratic innovation and reform, and for these same reasons his appointment came under criticism from many vested interests.

In 1938, Ushio was made a member of the Privy Council, and in 1946 became the final Vice-Chairman of the Privy Council before that body was dissolved by order of the American occupation authorities. Ushio was chairman of a committee of thirteen councilors assigned to review and comment on the new post-war Constitution of Japan.

== Notes ==
Political offices
Preceded by Takukichi Kawasaki	Education Minister (interim); 9 March 1936 – 25 March 1936	Succeeded by Hirano Hachisaburō
Preceded by Fumio Gotō	Home Minister; 9 March 1936 – 2 February 1937	Succeeded by Kakichi Kawarada
