= Machida Chūji =

Japanese politician

- 町田 忠治
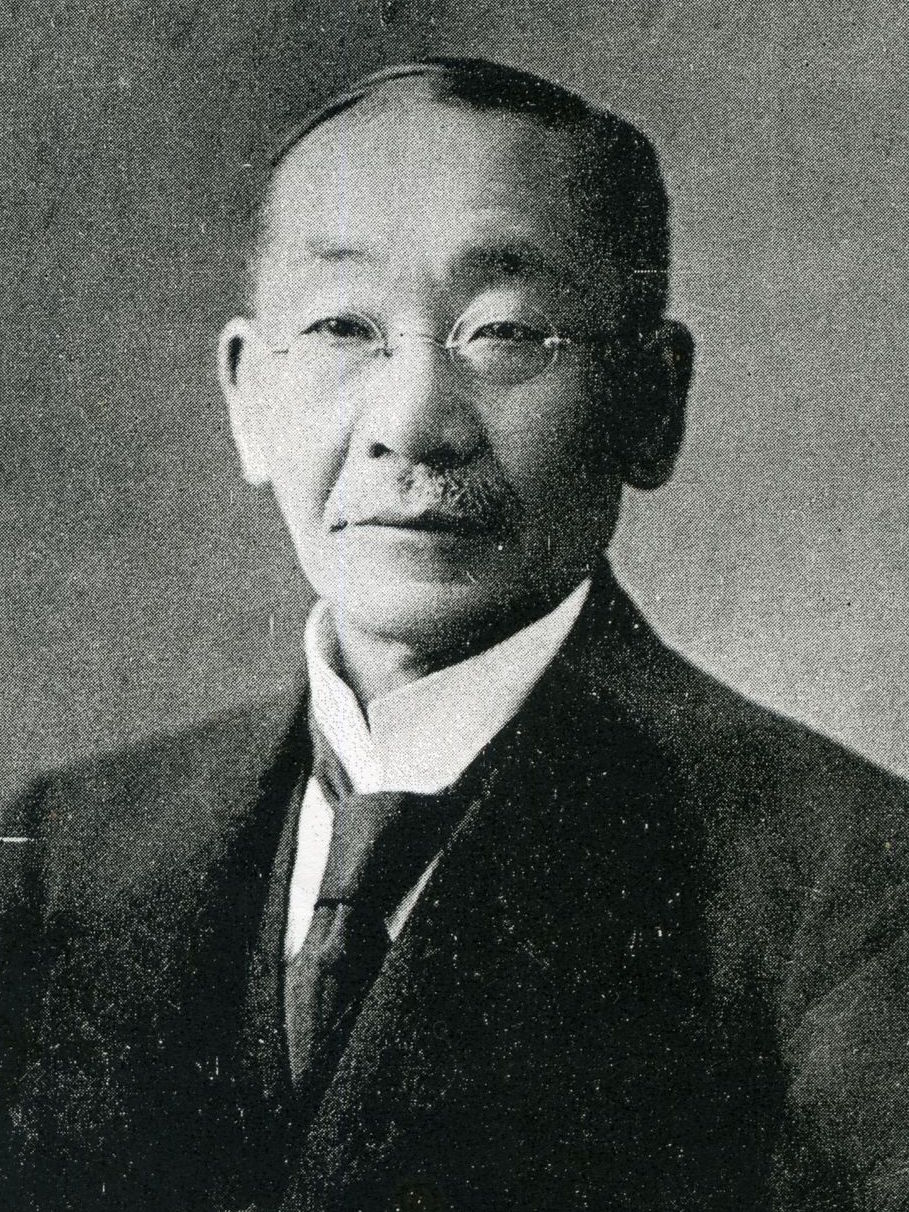
- Machida in 1929

President of the Japan Progressive Party
- In office 18 November 1945 – 23 April 1946
- Preceded by: Position established
- Succeeded by: Kijūrō Shidehara

President of the Rikken Minseitō
- In office 20 January 1935 – 15 August 1940
- Preceded by: Wakatsuki Reijirō
- Succeeded by: Position abolished

Minister of Finance
- In office 27 February 1936 – 9 March 1936
- Prime Minister: Keisuke Okada
- Preceded by: Takahashi Korekiyo
- Succeeded by: Eiichi Baba

Minister of Commerce and Industry
- In office 8 July 1934 – 9 March 1936
- Prime Minister: Keisuke Okada
- Preceded by: Jōji Matsumoto
- Succeeded by: Kawasaki Takukichi

Minister of Agriculture and Forestry
- In office 2 July 1929 – 13 December 1931
- Prime Minister: Hamaguchi Osachi; Wakatsuki Reijirō
- Preceded by: Teijirō Yamamoto
- Succeeded by: Teijirō Yamamoto
- In office 3 June 1926 – 20 April 1927
- Prime Minister: Wakatsuki Reijirō
- Preceded by: Hayami Seiji
- Succeeded by: Teijirō Yamamoto

Member of the House of Representatives
- In office 11 May 1924 – 4 January 1946
- Preceded by: Narita Naoichirō
- Succeeded by: Constituency abolished
- Constituency: Akita 4th (1924–1928); Akita 1st (1928–1946)
- In office 16 May 1912 – 26 February 1920
- Preceded by: Multi-member district
- Succeeded by: Constituency abolished
- Constituency: Akita Counties

Personal details
- Born: 17 May 1863 Akita, Dewa, Japan
- Died: 12 November 1946 (aged 83) Tokyo, Japan
- Party: Rikken Minseitō (1927–1940)
- Other political affiliations: Rikken Kokumintō (1912–1913); Rikken Dōshikai (1913–1916); Kenseikai (1916–1927); IRAA (1940–1945); JPP (1945–1946)
- Education: Tokyo Imperial University

Machida Chūji (町田忠治; 17 May 1863 – 12 November 1946) was a politician and cabinet minister in the pre-war Empire of Japan.

== Early life ==
Machida was born in Akita as the fourth son to a samurai in the service of Kubota Domain. However, his father died when he was three years old. He was raised by his grandparents until adopted by an uncle in 1875, to whose estate he succeeded. He moved to Tokyo and studied at preparatory schools for Tokyo Imperial University, where one of his classmates was Ichiki Kitokurō. Although he passed his examinations, he had frequent health problems in Tokyo, including bouts of beri-beri and was forced to return to Akita. In 1883, he was invited to become an editor for the Akita Sakegake Newspaper, where he specialized in political topics and became acquainted with noted politician Inukai Tsuyoshi. In the summer of 1884, he returned to Tokyo, where he attended the law school of Tokyo Imperial University. One of his classmates at this time was Uchida Kosai and Hayashi Gonsuke. However, because of his frequent absences and failure to complete his preliminary studies, Machida never obtained a degree.

On the recommendation of Kaneko Kentaro, Machida obtained a post at the Cabinet Legislation Bureau for a year, before leaving to become a reporter for the Choya Shimbun. This newspaper was a mouthpiece for Inukai and Ozaki Yukio. In November 1891, at the urging of Ozaki, Machida moved to the Hochi Shimbun, where he introduced the theories of Italian economist Luigi Cossa on public finance to the general public. His translations were adopted by Waseda University as a textbook.

In May 1893, Machida departed Yokohama for the United States, and from there to England, where he spent a year studying finance and economics. After his return to Japan, in November 1895, he helped establish the Toyo Keizai Shimbun, an economics newspaper. However, in December the following year, at the recommendation of Tameyuki Amano, he became an assistant director of the Bank of Japan.

In January 1898, Machida was requested by Bank of Japan chairman Iwasaki Yanosuke to go to Osaka as an auditor to investigate irregularities and managerial disputes. He subsequently became chairman of Yamaguchi Bank (the forerunner of Sanwa Bank)

== Political career ==
On May 15, 1912 Machida was elected to a seat from the Akita district in the lower house of the Diet of Japan. He was subsequently elected ten times to the same seat. He joined the 2nd Okuma cabinet as parliamentary undersecretary for Agriculture and Commerce, where he set official government-determined wholesale price of rice. Initially with the Rikken Kokumintō, Machida later joined the Rikken Dōshikai, Kenseikai and Rikken Minseitō (of which he became president in 1935).

From 1919–1926, Machida was also president of the Hochi Shimbun. Machida was defeated in the 1920 General Election, but regained his seat in the 1924 General Election, becoming House Budget Committee chairman under the Katō cabinet. In June 1926, he joined the Wakatsuki cabinet as Minister of Agriculture and Forestry. As Agriculture Minister, he addressed the issues of rural debt consolidation and rural development, while preventing extreme fluctuations in the price of rice, drawing praise from both the ruling and opposition parties. He continued in the same position under the Hamaguchi administration. In July 1934 he agreed to serve as a consultant to the Okada cabinet, but was soon appointed Minister of Commerce and Industry as well as Minister of Finance. He strongly supported small and medium businesses through the establishment of the Shoko Chukin Bank.

In 1935, Machida, in his role as Japanese Minister of Commerce and Industry, met with former U.S. Ambassador to Japan, W. Cameron Forbes. Forbes was Chairman of an American Economic Mission to Japan and China to promote good business relations. The May 3rd, 1935 photo to the right presents Forbes visiting Machida at Machida's official residence in Tokyo. Together, they renegotiated agreements that would improve commercial relations between the two nations.

Machida was promoted as a possible successor to Wakatsuki Reijirō as party president, which he accepted in 1935; however, although he remained party president until 1940, the February 26 Incident ended hopes that he would one day become prime minister. Machida served in the 1st Konoe, Hiranuma, and 2nd Konoe administrations as an advisor, and in the Koiso administration as a Minister of State. He refused an offer to join the Privy Council and elevation to the kazoku peerage as a baron, preferring to remain a commoner. During World War II, he joined the Taisei Yokusankai despite his previous outspoken objections to a one-party state, and the Imperial Rule Assistance Political Association in 1942.

After World War II, Machida briefly became the first president of the Japan Progressive Party in November 1945, but was purged in January 1946 by the American occupation authorities. He died in November of the same year. Kijūrō Shidehara, a long time friend, presided over his funeral.

Political offices
Preceded by Hayami Seiji	Minister of Agriculture and Forestry; 7 Jun 1926 – 20 Apr 1927	Succeeded by Teijirō Yamamoto
Preceded by Teijirō Yamamoto	Minister of Agriculture and Forestry; 2 Jul 1929 – 13 Dec 1931	Succeeded by Teijirō Yamamoto
Preceded by Jōji Matsumoto	Minister of Commerce and Industry; 8 Jul 1934 – 9 Mar 1936	Succeeded by Takukichi Kawasaki
Preceded by Takahashi Korekiyo	Minister of Finance; 27 Feb 1936 – 9 Mar 1936	Succeeded by Eiichi Baba
