= Kakichi Kawarada =

Japanese politician (1886–1955)

- 河原田 稼吉
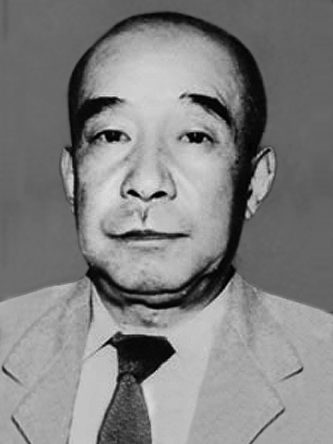

Minister of Education
- In office 30 August 1939 – 16 January 1940
- Prime Minister: Nobuyuki Abe
- Preceded by: Sadao Araki
- Succeeded by: Shigejirō Matsuura

Minister of Home Affairs
- In office 2 February 1937 – 4 June 1937
- Prime Minister: Senjūrō Hayashi
- Preceded by: Shigenosuke Ushio
- Succeeded by: Eiichi Baba

Member of the House of Representatives
- In office 2 October 1952 – 22 January 1955
- Preceded by: Mitsue Tsumuraya
- Succeeded by: Sadayoshi Hatta
- Constituency: Fukushima 2nd

Member of the House of Peers
- In office 7 January 1938 – 14 May 1946 Nominated by the Emperor

Governor of Osaka Prefecture
- In office 1 July 1943 – 1 August 1944
- Monarch: Hirohito
- Preceded by: Chōji Minabe
- Succeeded by: Kiyoshi Ikeda

Personal details
- Born: 13 January 1886 Tokyo, Japan
- Died: 22 January 1955 (aged 69) Chiyoda, Tokyo, Japan
- Party: Liberal
- Education: Tokyo Imperial University

Kakichi Kawarada (河原田 稼吉, Kawarada Kakichi; 13 January 1886 – 22 January 1955) was a bureaucrat and cabinet minister in early Shōwa period Japan.

== Early life ==
Kawarada was born in Tokyo as Kakichi Okumura, the son of a samurai from Mimasaka Province. He was adopted by Kawarada Moriharu, originally from Aizu Domain and later an official in the Meiji government and expert in fisheries science who was later an aide to the Konoe family.

== Bureaucratic career ==
After his graduation in 1909 from the law school of Tokyo Imperial University with a major in constitutional law, Kakichi Kawarada entered the Home Ministry. He rose rapidly within the ministry, serving as Bureau Director for Social Welfare, and Bureau Director for Labor Affairs. He subsequently served as General-Secretary to the Governor-General of Taiwan, and Director of the Transportation Ministry of the Governor-General of Taiwan. Under the Inukai administration, he was Cabinet Under-Secretary. It was around this time that he became affiliated with the Rikken Seiyūkai political party, although he was also very close to Fumimaro Konoe due to his family ties.

== Political career ==
In 1937, Kawarada was appointed Home Minister in the Hayashi Cabinet at the urging of Konoe. From January 1938 until May 1946, he served in the House of Peers . In 1939, Kawarada was selected as Education Minister under the Abe Noriyuki administration. During World War II, from 1943-1945, Kawarada served as Governor of Osaka Prefecture. He was also chairman of the National Health Insurance Fund Association. After the surrender of Japan, he was (along with all other members of the wartime government), purged by orders of the American occupation authorities.

However, in the 1952 General Election, he was elected to the post-war lower house of the Diet of Japan under the Liberal Party ticket from the Fukushima 2nd Electoral District. He was re-elected in the 1953 General Election, but died while in office. His grave is at the Buddhist temple of Tennō-ji, in Taitō, Tokyo.

Political offices
Preceded by Sadao Araki	Education Minister; 30 August 1939 – 16 January 1940	Succeeded by Shizujirō Matsuura
Preceded by Shigenosuke Ushio	Home Minister; 2 February 1937 – 4 June 1937	Succeeded by Eiichi Baba
