= Genki Abe =

Japanese lawyer, police bureaucrat and cabinet minister

- 安倍源基
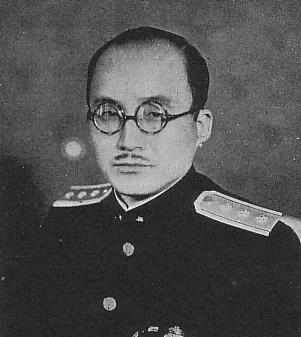

Minister of Home Affairs
- In office 7 April 1945 – 17 August 1945
- Prime Minister: Kantaro Suzuki
- Preceded by: Shigeo Ōdachi
- Succeeded by: Iwao Yamazaki

Personal details
- Born: 14 February 1894 Kumage, Yamaguchi, Japan
- Died: 8 October 1989 (aged 95)
- Children: Motoo Abe
- Education: Tokyo Imperial University

Genki Abe (安倍源基, Abe Genki; 14 February 1894 – 8 October 1989) was a lawyer, police bureaucrat and cabinet minister in early Shōwa era Japan.

== Biography ==
Abe was born in Kumage District, Yamaguchi, in what is now part of the town of Hirao, as the eldest son of an ex-samurai. After his graduation in 1920 from the law school of Tokyo Imperial University, he entered the Home Ministry.

In 1932, Abe was appointed chief of the Tokubetsu Kōtō Keisatsu (Tokkō) in Tokyo, the Japanese "special higher police" equivalent to the American Federal Bureau of Investigation, combining both criminal investigation and counter-espionage functions. Under the 1925 Peace Preservation Law, the Tokkō was especially tasked to investigate and control political groups and ideologies deemed to be a threat to public order, and came to be nicknamed the "thought police" (shisō keisatsu). Abe quickly made a name for himself in this position by spearheading a vigorous campaign against the Japan Communist Party and suspected sympathizers and supporters from 1932 to 1933, during which time at least 19 people arrested for political crimes died during interrogation while in police custody, including noted proletarian literature movement author Takiji Kobayashi.

Following the February 26 incident, Abe was a member of the council supervising enforcement of martial law in Tokyo. In 1937, Abe rose to the position of superintendent-general of the police, the highest-ranking office in the police administration. He was reappointed to the same position in 1940. In 1941, Abe became deputy director of the Cabinet Planning Board.

In 1945, towards the closing stages of World War II, Abe was made Home Minister in the Kantarō Suzuki Cabinet. He was critical of Japan's lack of adequate air raid shelters, which he asserted was due to the government's fear of public reaction and concerns that this would interfere with war production. He was also outspoken in his opposition to acceptance of the Potsdam Declaration, one of the conditions imposed on the surrender of Japan, fearing that the Imperial Japanese Army would revolt, and assassinate the signers of the acceptance declaration.

After the surrender of Japan, Abe (along with all other members of the wartime government), was arrested on charges of Class A war crimes by orders of the American occupation authorities and was held in Sugamo Prison. He was never brought to trial, and was released after the execution of Hideki Tojo in December 1948.

In 1956, Abe ran for a seat in the House of Councillors hoping to represent Yamaguchi district for the newly-formed Liberal Democratic Party (LDP), but was defeated due to his unsavory prewar reputation. This was one of only three times in the postwar period that the LDP failed to win the upper house election in Yamaguchi.

When Nobusuke Kishi became prime minister in 1957, he sought to appoint his old friend Abe as Chairman of the National Public Safety Commission, but had to withdraw the appointment amid opposition.

In the later 1950s Abe sought to unite right-wing groups under the umbrella of the Council for a New Japan (Shin Nippon Kyōgikai), which he co-founded and chaired, but this effort collapsed in 1959 amid disagreements over how to respond to the massive Anpo protests against the U.S.-Japan Security Treaty.

Abe died in 1989 at the age of 95.

== Notes ==
Political offices
Preceded by Shigeo Ōdachi	Home Minister; 7 April 1945 – 17 August 1945	Succeeded by Iwao Yamazaki
Government offices
Preceded by Kiyoshi Ikeda	Superintendent General of the Tokyo Metropolitan Police; 1940	Succeeded by Iwao Yamazaki
Preceded by Itsuki Saito	Superintendent General of the Tokyo Metropolitan Police; 1937 – 1939	Succeeded by Gunzō Kayaba
Preceded by Seiichi Ōmura	Chief of the Police Bureau in the Home Ministry; 1937	Succeeded by Kenji Tomita
