= Suetsugu Nobumasa =

Imperial Japanese Navy admiral (d. 1944)

Nobumasa Suetsugu
- 末次 信正
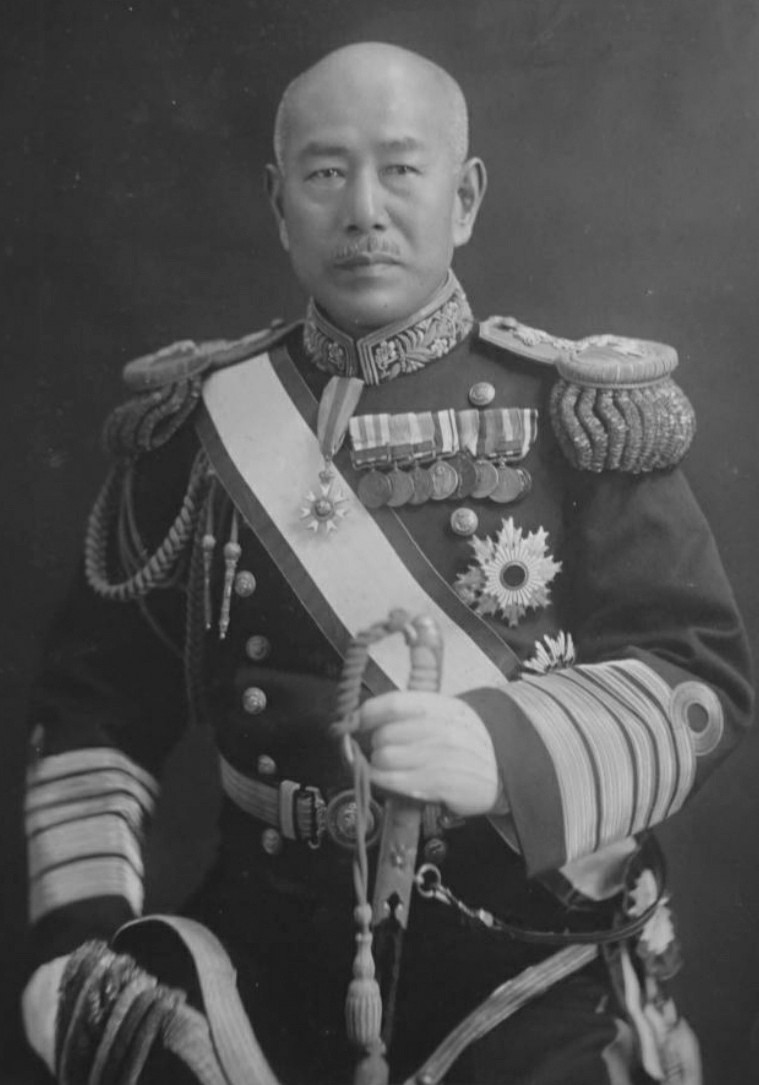

Minister of Home Affairs
- In office 14 December 1937 – 5 January 1939
- Prime Minister: Fumimaro Konoe
- Preceded by: Eiichi Baba
- Succeeded by: Kōichi Kido

Personal details
- Born: 30 June 1880 Yamaguchi Prefecture, Japan
- Died: 29 December 1944 (aged 64)
- Resting place: Tama Cemetery
- Education: Naval Staff College

Military service
- Allegiance: Empire of Japan
- Branch/service: Imperial Japanese Navy
- Years of service: 1899–1937
- Rank: Admiral
- Commands: Tama, 2nd Fleet, Maizuru Naval District, 1st Fleet, Combined Fleet, Yokosuka Naval District
- Battles/wars: Russo-Japanese War; World War I
- Awards: Order of the Rising Sun; Order of the Sacred Treasure; Order of St Michael and St George

Nobumasa Suetsugu (末次 信正, Suetsugu Nobumasa; 30 June 1880 – 29 December 1944) was an admiral in the Imperial Japanese Navy, and briefly served as Home Minister in the 1940s.

== Biography ==
Suetsugu was born in Yamaguchi Prefecture as the younger son of a former samurai in the service of Tokuyama Domain. He graduated from the 27th class of the Imperial Japanese Naval Academy, ranked 50th out of 114 cadets. He served as a junior officer on several smaller craft, including a combat tour during the Russo-Japanese War on the gunboat Banjō. After the war, he attended the Naval Staff College where he specialized in naval artillery, graduating with honors from the class of 1909 with the rank of lieutenant commander.

After serving as chief gunnery officer on the battleship Hizen and cruiser Tokiwa, he was assigned to the Imperial Japanese Navy General Staff Office. In 1914, he was sent to Great Britain as a naval attaché during World War I and was promoted to commander. During the war, he served on HMS Agamemnon and HMS Queen Mary and reported on the Battle of Jutland. He became a strong advocate on the increased use of submarines by the Imperial Japanese Navy, which he felt could be deployed to an advantage in an attrition strategy against the United States Navy provided that issues with long-distance operations could be overcome.

After his return to Japan in 1916, he served on the staff of the IJN 1st Fleet. In December 1918, Suetsugu was promoted to captain and was given command of the cruiser Tama.

Suetsugu subsequently served on the Japanese delegation to the Washington Naval Treaty negotiations in 1921, although he was a prominent member of the Fleet Faction. During his period in staff assignments at the Imperial Japanese Navy General Staff, he worked on revisions to the Japanese battle plans and strategies, especially targeting the United States Navy, and to opposing the efforts of the Treaty Faction, especially after the signing of the London Naval Treaty. He was promoted to rear admiral in 1923 and vice admiral in 1927. In December 1931, he became commander of the Maizuru Naval District and in December 1932 became commander of the IJN 2nd Fleet. In 1933, he commanded the Combined Fleet and the IJN 1st Fleet. Suetsugu promoted rigorous training for the fleet, especially in severe weather conditions. He was promoted to full admiral in 1934, and became commander of the Yokosuka Naval District in December of the same year.

In December 1935, Suetsugu joined the Supreme War Council. He retired from active service in October 1937 and entered the reserves.

In December 1937, Suetsugu was named Home Minister in the First Konoe Cabinet, serving in that post until January 1939. Noted for his extremely anti-leftist politics, Suetsugu immediately ordered the Tokko special police to begin widespread arrests of known left-wing individuals. He strongly supported Konoe’s plans for the creation of a single-party state under the Taisei Yokusankai. He was an outspoken advocate of the Tripartite Pact with Nazi Germany and Fascist Italy He was outspoken against those in the government and even those in the Imperial Japanese Army who were advocating a negotiated settlement to end the Second Sino-Japanese War.

He served as a Cabinet councilor under the Hiranuma administration from January to August 1939, and as a special advisor to the cabinet under the Koiso administration from October to the end of December 1944.

Suetsugu died in December 1944. His grave is at the Tama Cemetery in Fuchū, Tokyo.

== Family ==
Suetsugu's eldest son Nobuyoshi followed him into the Imperial Japanese Navy, graduating 20th out of 113 cadets in the Imperial Japanese Naval Academy's 58th Class and rising to the rank of Commander. On 7 April 1945, he was Killed in Action (KIA) aboard the battleship Yamato while serving as a Staff officer of Second Fleet and was posthumously promoted to Captain.

== Bibliography ==
- Boyd, Carl (2002). The Japanese Submarine Force in World War II. Bluejacket Books. ISBN 1612512062.
- Toland, John (1992). The Rising Sun: The Decline and Fall of the Japanese Empire, 1936–1945. Modern Library. ISBN 0-8129-6858-1.
- Gow, Ian (2004). Military Intervention in Pre-War Japanese Politics: Admiral Kato Kanji and the Washington System. Routledge. ISBN 0700713158.
- Vego, Milan N (2009). Joint Operational Warfare: Theory and Practice. Government Printing Office.
- Spang, Christian W (2006). Japanese-German Relations, 1895–1945: War, Diplomacy and Public Opinion. Routledge. ISBN 0203481585.
- Boyl, John Hunter (1992). China and Japan at War, 1937–1945: The Politics of Collaboration. Stanford University Press. ISBN 0804708002.

Military offices
Preceded by Kiyokawa Junichi	Maizuru Guard District; Commander-in-chief; 1 December 1930 - 1 December 1931	Succeeded by Ōminato Naotarō
Preceded by Nakamura Ryōzō	2nd Fleet; Commander-in-chief; 1 December 1931 – 15 November 1933	Succeeded by Takahashi Sankichi
Preceded by Kobayashi Seizō	Combined Fleet & 1st Fleet; Commander-in-chief; 15 November 1933 – 15 November 1934	Succeeded by Takahashi Sankichi
Preceded by Nagano Osami	Yokosuka Naval District; Commander-in-chief; 15 November 1934 - 2 December 1935	Succeeded by Yonai Mitsumasa
Political offices
Preceded by Eiichi Baba	Home Minister; 14 December 1937 – 5 January 1938	Succeeded by Kōichi Kido
