= Gōtarō Ogawa =

Japanese politician

- 小川 郷太郎
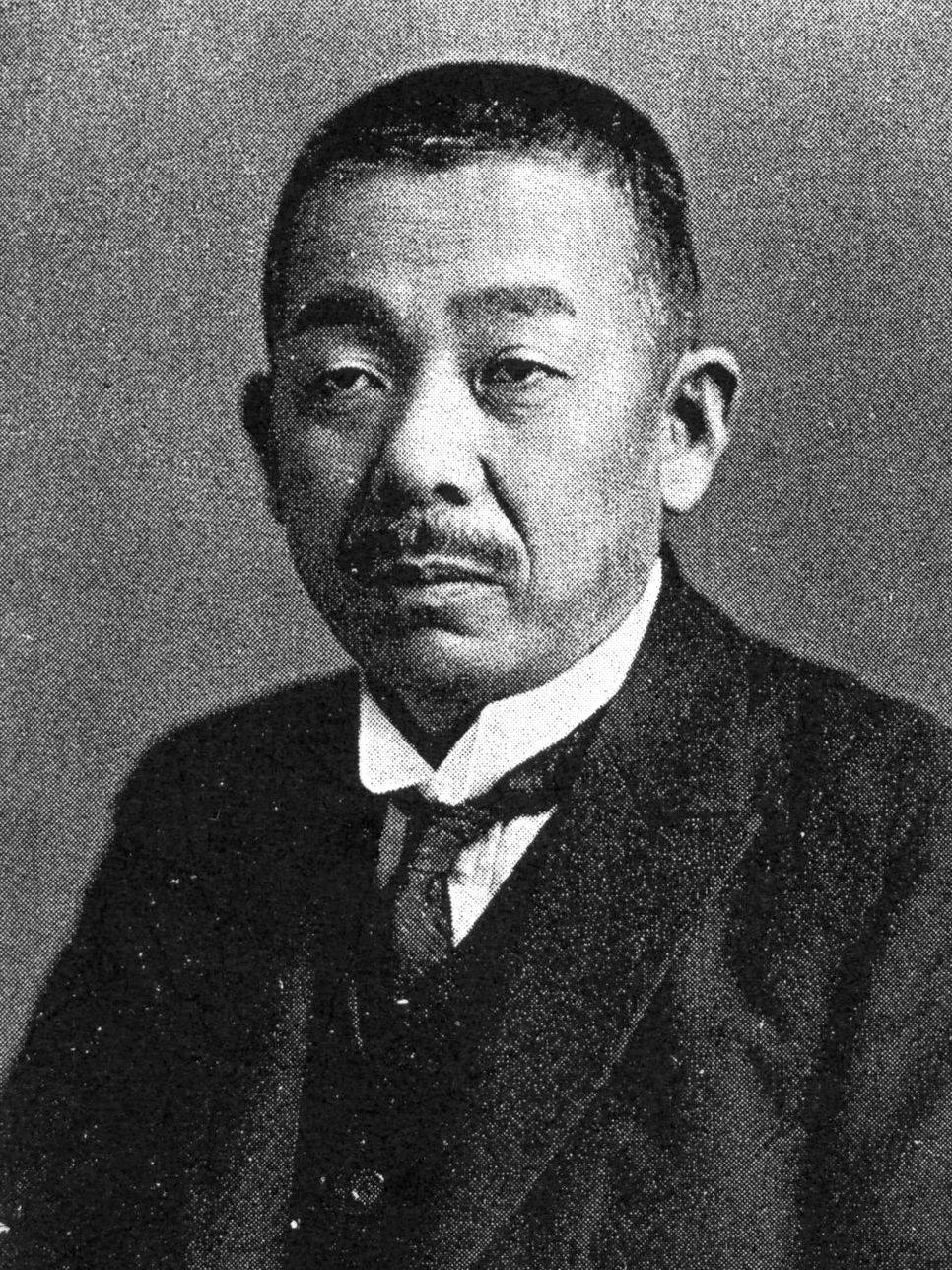
- Ogawa in 1929

Minister of Railways
- In office 28 September 1940 – 18 July 1941
- Prime Minister: Fumimaro Konoe
- Preceded by: Shōzō Murata
- Succeeded by: Shōzō Murata

Minister of Commerce and Industry
- In office 28 March 1936 – 2 February 1937
- Prime Minister: Kōki Hirota
- Preceded by: Kawasaki Takukichi
- Succeeded by: Takuo Godō

Member of the House of Representatives
- In office 10 May 1924 – 1 April 1945
- Preceded by: Moriya Matsunosuke
- Succeeded by: Constituency abolished
- Constituency: Okayama 5th (1924–1928); Okayama 2nd (1928–1945)
- In office 20 April 1917 – 26 February 1920
- Preceded by: Katō Kotarō
- Succeeded by: Constituency abolished
- Constituency: Kyoto City

Personal details
- Born: 9 June 1876 Satoshō, Okayama, Japan
- Died: 1 April 1945 (aged 68) East China Sea
- Party: IRAA (1940–1945)
- Other political affiliations: Shinseikai (1917–1920); Seiyūhontō (1924–1927); CDP (1927–1940)
- Education: Kaisei Academy; First Higher School
- Alma mater: Tokyo Imperial University; Kyoto Imperial University

Gōtarō Ogawa (小川郷太郎, Ogawa Gōtarō; 9 June 1876 – 1 April 1945) was an economist, educator, politician and cabinet minister in the pre-war Empire of Japan.

== Early life and education ==
Ogawa was born in Satoshō, Okayama as the son of Murayama Kikuzo, but was adopted into a prominent family of doctors in Okayama. He graduated from Tokyo Imperial University Imperial College of Law in 1903 with honors, from the Department of Political Science, and obtained a post at the Ministry of Finance. However, the following year, he was recruited by Kyoto Imperial University, which had just established a Department of Economics, and was sent to Europe for six years to study public finance in Germany and Austria. On his return, he worked at Kyoto Imperial University as a professor of economics, specializing on the economic effects of war. In 1917, he was awarded a doctorate in law.

== Political career ==
Ogawa then entered politics, winning a seat in the House of Representatives of Japan in the 1917 general election, and was subsequently re-elected to the same seat in the Okayama constituency a total of eight times. Initially with the Shinseikai, he later assisted in the formation of the Seiyu Hontō political party, subsequently serving as president of its policy research committee, and joined the Rikken Minseitō when the Seiyu Hontō merged with the Kenseikai.

Ogawa left Kyoto Imperial University in 1924 to accept the post of dean of Takushoku University. In 1929, he served as parliamentary under-secretary for Finance under the Hamaguchi Cabinet.

In 1936, Prime Minister Kōki Hirota asked that Ogawa accept the post of Minister of Commerce and Industry. In this position, he opposed many of the ministry bureaucrats who were pushing towards increased state control over the economy, and forced a number, including Nobusuke Kishi, to resign.

In 1940 he served in the Second Konoe Cabinet as Railway Minister. After the start of World War II, in 1943, he took charge of the committee of internal affairs of the Taisei Yokusankai. However, later in 1943, he was invited to the nominally independent State of Burma by President Ba Maw as a special advisor on economics and finance. He spent the remainder of the war years in Burma, attempting to set the country on a secure footing through financial consolidation.

== Death ==
On April 1, 1945, while attempting to return to Japan, Ogawa was killed as a passenger on the Awa Maru, which was sunk by the US submarine USS Queenfish (SS-393) in the East China Sea despite its status as a hospital ship under Red Cross protection. In 1968, he was posthumously awarded with the Order of the Rising Sun, 3rd class.

Political offices
Preceded by Takukichi Kawasaki	Minister of Commerce and Industry; Mar 1936 – Feb 1937	Succeeded by Takuo Godō
Preceded by Shōzō Murata	Minister of Railway; Sept 1940 – July 1941	Succeeded by Shōzō Murata
