= Masanori Katsu =

Japanese politician

- 勝 正憲
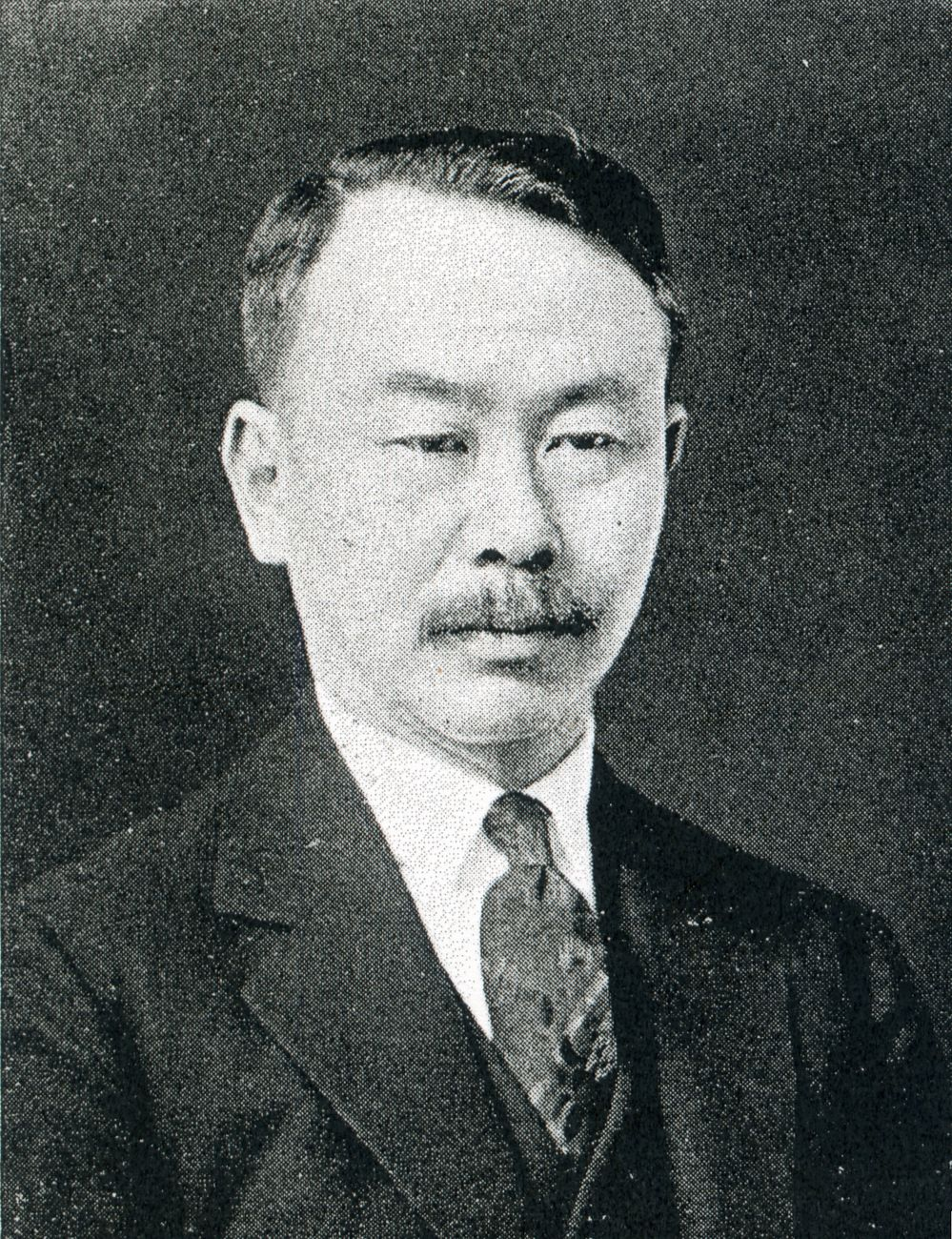
- Katsu in 1929

Minister of Communications
- In office 16 January 1940 – 22 July 1940
- Prime Minister: Mitsumasa Yonai
- Preceded by: Ryūtarō Nagai
- Succeeded by: Shōzō Murata

Member of the House of Representatives
- In office 20 February 1928 – 18 December 1945
- Preceded by: Constituency established
- Succeeded by: Constituency abolished
- Constituency: Fukuoka 4th

Personal details
- Born: 21 May 1879 Fukuoka Prefecture, Japan
- Died: 11 November 1957 (aged 78)
- Party: Rikken Minseitō (1928–1940)
- Other political affiliations: IRAA (1940–1945); JPP (1945–1946)
- Education: Tokyo Imperial University

Masanori Katsu (勝 正憲, Katsu Masanori; 21 May 1879 – 11 November 1957) was a Japanese bureaucrat, politician and cabinet minister in the Taishō and early Shōwa periods of the Japan.

== Biography ==
Katsu was born in Fukuoka Prefecture, as the eldest son of a samurai retainer of Kokura Domain. He graduated with a law degree from Tokyo Imperial University in 1905, after which he worked as a bureaucrat at the Ministry of Finance, and was assigned to various local and regional tax offices and customs offices in the course of his career.

In 1928, Katsu was elected in the Japanese general election of 1928 to the lower house of the Diet of Japan, under the Rikken Minseitō party. He was reelected six times to the same seat. In 1928, he was appointed Parliamentary Under-Secretary for Finance under the Hamaguchi administration and Vice-Minister for Commerce and Industry under the Okada administration in 1934. In January 1940, he was appointed Communications Minister in the Yonai administration . An early supporter of the Imperial Rule Assistance Association, he was chairman of General Affairs. After the surrender of Japan, he was one of the members of the short-lived Japan Progressive Party (Shinpo-tō) led by Inukai Takeru. However, in 1946 he was purged from public office by the American occupation authorities.

Political offices
| Preceded by Ryūtarō Nagai | Minister of Communications; 16 January – 22 July 1940 | Succeeded by Shōzō Murata |
