= Jōji Matsumoto =

Japanese politician (1877–1954)

- 松本 烝治
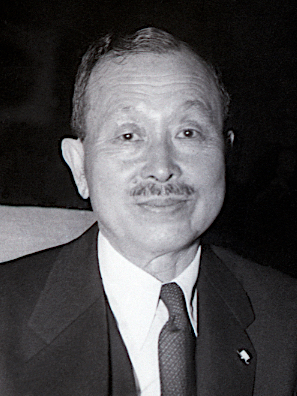

Minister of State (in charge of the Committee to Study Constitutional Problems)
- In office 9 October 1945 – 22 May 1946
- Prime Minister: Kijūrō Shidehara
- Preceded by: Position established
- Succeeded by: Position abolished

Minister of Commerce and Industry
- In office 9 February 1934 – 8 July 1934
- Prime Minister: Saitō Makoto
- Preceded by: Kumakichi Nakajima
- Succeeded by: Machida Chūji

Director-General of the Legislative Bureau
- In office 2 September 1923 – 7 January 1924
- Prime Minister: Yamamoto Gonnohyōe
- Preceded by: Eiichi Baba
- Succeeded by: Sango Satake

Member of the House of Peers
- In office 2 January 1924 – 25 June 1946 Nominated by the Emperor

Personal details
- Born: 14 October 1877 Tokyo, Japan
- Died: 8 October 1954 (aged 76) Tokyo, Japan
- Resting place: Tama Cemetery
- Party: Independent
- Relatives: Kōtarō Tanaka (son-in-law)
- Education: Tokyo Imperial University
- Occupation: Legal scholar, cabinet minister
- Awards: Order of the Rising Sun

Jōji Matsumoto (松本烝治, Matsumoto Jōji; 14 October 1877 – 8 October 1954) was a legal scholar, politician and cabinet minister in the pre-war Empire of Japan. He is also the author of the “Matsumoto Draft”, a proposal for revision of the Constitution of the Empire of Japan in the immediate post-war period.

== Early life and education ==
Matsumoto was born in Tokyo to an ex-samurai family. He graduated from Tokyo Imperial University and was accepted into the Ministry of Agriculture and Commerce as a bureaucrat, before returning to Tokyo Imperial University as an assistant professor in 1903. He travelled to Europe from 1906 to 1909 for further studies and returned to Tokyo Imperial University in 1910 to join as a full professor.

== Career ==
In 1919, Matsumoto accepted a post on the board of directors of the South Manchurian Railway Company and eventually rose to the position of vice-president. From 1923, under the second Yamamoto and the Kiyoura administrations, he served as Assistant Director-General of the Cabinet Legislation Bureau. Matsumoto was elected to the Imperial Academy in 1924 and also became the President of Kansai University the same year.

In 1934, Prime Minister Saito Makoto asked that Matsumoto replace Kumakichi Nakajima as Minister of Commerce and Industry. In 1938, he supervised the implementation of a new commercial law.

Matsumoto returned to the government after World War II under the Shidehara administration as a Minister of State, in charge of the “Committee to Study Constitutional Problems” established by order of General Douglas MacArthur to study constitutional amendment, informally known as the “Matsumoto Committee”. However, the Committee soon decided that only minor changes were needed. Their proposals (i.e. the “Matsumoto Proposal”) were immediately rejected as being too conservative, and a draft of what later became the post-war Constitution of Japan prepared by the Supreme Commander of the Allied Powers was issued instead.

== Later life and death ==
Matsumoto then went into the private sector, opening a legal office, providing legal advice on commercial issues, and acting as a statutory auditor. He also served as a member of the organizing committee for the Tokyo Symphony Orchestra. Matsumoto died in 1954 and was posthumously awarded the Order of the Rising Sun, 1st class. His grave is at the Tama Cemetery in Tokyo.

== Notes ==
Political offices
Preceded by Kumakichi Nakajima	Minister of Commerce and Industry; Feb 1934 – Jul 1934	Succeeded by Machida Chūji
