= Home Ministry =

Japanese government ministry (1873–1947)

- 内務省; Naimu-shō

Agency overview
- Formed: November 10, 1873
- Dissolved: December 31, 1947
- Superseding agencies: National Police Agency; Ministry of Health and Welfare; Ministry of Construction; Ministry of Home Affairs
- Jurisdiction: Japan
- Headquarters: Chiyoda-ku, Tokyo, Japan
- Parent agency: Empire of Japan

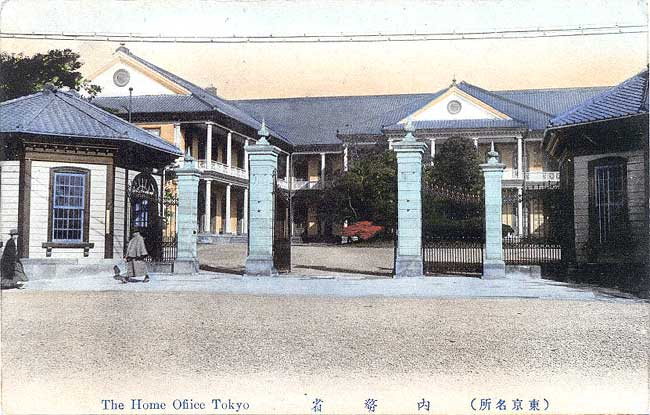
Home Ministry (Naimu-shō) offices, Tokyo, pre-1923

The Home Ministry (内務省, Naimu-shō) was a Cabinet-level ministry established under the Meiji Constitution that managed the internal affairs of Empire of Japan from 1873 to 1947. Its duties included local administration, elections, police, monitoring people, social policy and public works. In 1938, the HM's social policy was detached from itself, then the Ministry of Health and Welfare was established. In 1947, the HM was abolished under the Supreme Commander for the Allied Powers restoration, then its administrative affairs were proceeded to the National Police Agency, the Ministry of Construction, the Ministry of Home Affairs and so on.

In 2001, the MOHA was integrated with the Management and Coordination Agency and the Ministry of Posts and Telecommunications, then the Ministry of Public Management, Home affairs, Posts and Telecommunications was established. In 2004, the MPHPT changed its English name into the Ministry of Internal Affairs and Communications.

== History ==
=== Early Meiji period ===
After the Meiji Restoration, the leaders of the new Meiji government envisioned a highly centralized state to replace the old feudal order. Within months after Emperor Meiji's Charter Oath, the ancient ritsuryō structure from the late Heian period was revived in a modified form with an express focus on the separation of legislative, administrative, and judicial functions within a new Daijō-kan system.

Having just returned from the Iwakura Mission in 1873, Ōkubo Toshimichi pushed forward a plan for the creation of an "Interior ministry" within the Daijō-kan modeled after similar ministries in European nations, headed by himself. The Home Ministry was established as government department in November 1873, initially as an internal security agency to deal with possible threats to the government from increasingly disgruntled ex-samurai, and political unrest spawned by the Seikanron debate. In addition to controlling the police administration, the new department was also responsible for the Family register, civil engineering, topographic surveys, censorship, and promotion of agriculture. In 1874, administration of the post office was added to its responsibilities. In 1877, overview of religious institutes was added. The head of the Home Ministry was referred to as the "Home Lord" and effectively functioned as the Head of Government.

The Home Ministry also initially had the responsibility for promoting local industry, but this duty was taken over by the Ministry of Agriculture and Commerce in 1881.

=== Under the Meiji Constitution ===
In 1885, with the establishment of the cabinet system, the Home Ministry was reorganized by Yamagata Aritomo, who became the first Home Minister. Bureaus were created with responsibilities for general administration, local administration, police, public works, public health, postal administration, topographic surveys, religious institutions and the national census. The administration of Hokkaidō and Karafuto Prefectures also fell under the direct jurisdiction of the Home Ministry, and all prefectural governors (who were appointed by the central government) came under the jurisdiction of the Home Ministry. In 1890, the Railroad Ministry and in 1892, the Communications Ministry were created, removing the postal administration functions from the Home Ministry.

On the other hand, with the establishment of State Shinto, a Department of Religious Affairs was added to the Home Ministry in 1900. Following the High Treason Incident, the Tokko special police force was also created in 1911. The Department of Religious Affairs was transferred to the Ministry of Education in 1913.

From the 1920s period, faced with the growing issues of agrarian unrest and Bolshevik-inspired labor unrest, the attention of the Home Ministry was increasingly focused on internal security issues. Through passage of the Peace Preservation Law#Public Security Preservation Law of 1925, the Home Ministry was able to use its security apparatus to suppress political dissent and the curtail the activities of the socialists, communists and the labor movement. The power of the Tokkō was expanded tremendously, and it expanded to include branches in every Japanese prefecture, major city, and overseas locations with a large Japanese population. In the late 1920s and 1930s, the Tokkō launched a sustained campaign to destroy the Japanese Communist Party with several waves of mass arrests of known members, sympathizers and suspected sympathizers (March 15 incident).

In 1936, an Information and Propaganda Committee was created within the Home Ministry, which issued all official press statements, and which worked together with the Publications Monitoring Department on censorship issues. In 1937, jointly with the Ministry of Education, the Home Ministry administered the National Spiritual Mobilization Movement, and the Home Ministry assisted in implementation of the National Mobilization Law in 1938 to place Japan on a total war footing. The public health functions of the Ministry were separated into the Ministry of Health in 1938.

In 1940, the Information and Propaganda Department (情報部, Jōhōbu) was elevated to the Information Bureau (情報局, Jōhōkyoku), which consolidated the previously separate information departments from the Imperial Japanese Army, Imperial Japanese Navy and Foreign Ministry under the aegis of the Home Ministry. The new Jōhōkyoku had complete control over all news, advertising and public events. In February 1941 it distributed among editors a black list of writers whose articles they were advised not to print anymore.

Also in 1940, with the formation of the Taisei Yokusankai political party, the Home Ministry strengthened its efforts to monitor and control political dissent, also through enforcement of the tonarigumi system, which was also used to coordinate civil defense activities through World War II. In 1942, the Ministry of Colonial Affairs was abolished, and the Home Ministry extended its influence to Japanese external territories.

=== Post-war Home Ministry and dissolution ===
After the surrender of Japan, the Home Ministry coordinated closely with the Allied occupation forces to maintain public order in occupied Japan.

One of the first actions of the post-war Home Ministry was the creation of an officially sanctioned brothel system under the aegis of the "Recreation and Amusement Association", which was created on August 28, 1945. The intention was officially to contain the sexual urges of the occupation forces, protect the main Japanese populace from rape and preserve the "purity" of the "Japanese race". However, by October 1945, the scope of activities of the Home Ministry was increasingly limited, with the disestablishment of State Shinto and the abolishment of the Tokkō, and with censorship and monitoring of labor union activities taken under direct American supervision. Many of the employees of the Home Ministry were purged from office.

The American authorities felt that the concentration of power into a single ministry was both a cause and a symptom of Japan's pre-war totalitarian mentality, and also felt that the centralization of police authority into a massive centrally controlled ministry was dangerous for the democratic development of post-war Japan.

The Home Ministry was formally abolished on 31 December 1947 under the Removal of Restrictions on Political, Civil, and Religious Liberties. Its functions were dispersed to the Ministry of Home Affairs (自治省 Jiji-shō), now the Ministry of Internal Affairs and Communications, Ministry of Health and Welfare (厚生省 Kōsei-shō), now the Ministry of Health, Labour and Welfare, National Public Safety Commission (国家公安委員会 Kokka-kōan-iinkai), Ministry of Construction (建設省 Kensetsu-shō), now the Ministry of Land, Infrastructure and Transport.

== Lords of Home Affairs ==
	Name	Date in office	Date left office
1	Ōkubo Toshimichi	29 November 1873	14 February 1874
2	Kido Takayoshi	14 February 1874	27 April 1874
3	Ōkubo Toshimichi	27 April 1874	2 August 1874
4	Itō Hirobumi	2 August 1874	28 November 1874
5	Ōkubo Toshimichi	28 November 1874	14 May 1878
6	Itō Hirobumi	15 May 1878	28 February 1880
7	Matsukata Masayoshi	28 February 1880	21 October 1881
8	Yamada Akiyoshi	21 October 1881	12 December 1883
9	Yamagata Aritomo	12 December 1883	22 December 1885

== Ministers of Home Affairs ==
	Name	Cabinet	Date in office	Comments
1	Yamagata Aritomo	1st Itō	22 December 1885	
2	Yamagata Aritomo	Kuroda	30 April 1888	
3	Yamagata Aritomo	1st Yamagata	24 December 1889	Concurrently Prime Minister
4	Saigō Tsugumichi	1st Yamagata	17 May 1890	
5	Saigō Tsugumichi	1st Matsukata	6 May 1891	
6	Shinagawa Yajirō	1st Matsukata	1 June 1891	
7	Soejima Taneomi	1st Matsukata	11 March 1892	
8	Matsukata Masayoshi	1st Matsukata	8 June 1892	Concurrently Prime Minister & Finance Minister
9	Kōno Togama	1st Matsukata	14 July 1892	
10	Inoue Kaoru	2nd Itō	8 August 1892	
11	Nomura Yasushi	2nd Itō	15 October 1894	
12	Yoshikawa Akimasa	2nd Itō	3 February 1896	Concurrently Justice Minister
13	Itagaki Taisuke	2nd Itō	14 April 1896	
14	Itagaki Taisuke	2nd Matsukata	14 April 1896	
15	Kabayama Sukenori	2nd Matsukata	20 September 1896	
16	Yoshikawa Akimasa	3rd Itō	12 January 1898	
17	Itagaki Taisuke	1st Ōkuma	30 June 1898	
18	Saigō Tsugumichi	2nd Yamagata	8 November 1898	
19	Suematsu Kenchō	4th Itō	19 October 1900	
20	Utsumi Tadakatsu	1st Katsura	2 June 1901	
21	Kodama Gentarō	1st Katsura	15 July 1903	Concurrently Minister of Education
22	Katsura Tarō	1st Katsura	12 October 1903	Concurrently Prime Minister
23	Yoshikawa Akimasa	1st Katsura	20 February 1904	
24	Kiyoura Keigo	1st Katsura	16 September 1905	Concurrently Minister of Agriculture & Commerce
25	Hara Takashi	1st Saionji	7 January 1906	Concurrently Minister of Communications
26	Hirata Tosuke	2nd Katsura	14 July 1908	
27	Hara Takashi	2nd Saionji	30 August 1911	
28	Ōura Kanetake	3rd Katsura	21 December 1912	
29	Hara Takashi	1st Yamamoto	20 February 1913	
30	Ōkuma Shigenobu	2nd Ōkuma	16 April 1914	Concurrently Prime Minister
31	Ōura Kanetake	2nd Ōkuma	7 January 1915	
32	Ōkuma Shigenobu	2nd Ōkuma	30 July 1915	Concurrently Prince Minister
33	Ichiki Kitokurō	2nd Ōkuma	10 August 1915	
34	Gotō Shinpei	Terauchi	9 October 1916	
35	Mizuno Rentarō	Terauchi	24 April 1918	
36	Tokonami Takejirō	Hara	29 September 1918	
37	Tokonami Takejirō	Takahashi	13 November 1921	
38	Mizuno Rentarō	Katō Tomosaburō	12 June 1922	
39	Gotō Shinpei	2nd Yamamoto	2 September 1923	
40	Mizuno Rentarō	Kiyoura	7 January 1924	
41	Wakatsuki Reijirō	Katō Takaaki	11 June 1924	
42	Wakatsuki Reijirō	1st Wakatsuki	30 January 1926	Concurrently Prime Minister
43	Osachi Hamaguchi	1st Wakatsuki	3 June 1926	
44	Suzuki Kisaburō	Tanaka	20 April 1927	
45	Tanaka Giichi	Tanaka	4 May 1928	Concurrently Prime Minister
46	Mochizuki Keisuke	Tanaka	23 May 1928	
47	Adachi Kenzō	Hamaguchi	2 July 1929	
48	Adachi Kenzō	2nd Wakatsuki	14 April 1931	
49	Nakahashi Tokugorō	Inukai	13 December 1931	
50	Inukai Tsuyoshi	Inukai	16 March 1932	Concurrently Prime Minister
51	Suzuki Kisaburō	Inukai	25 March 1932	
52	Yamamoto Tatsuo	Saitō	26 May 1932	
53	Fumio Gotō	Okada	8 July 1934	
54	Shigenosuke Ushio	Hirota	9 March 1936	Concurrently Minister of Education
55	Kakichi Kawarada	Hayashi	2 February 1937	
56	Eiichi Baba	1st Konoe	4 June 1937	
57	Nobumasa Suetsugu	1st Konoe	14 December 1937	
58	Kōichi Kido	Hiranuma	5 January 1939	
59	Naoshi Ohara	Abe	30 August 1939	Concurrently Minister of Health
60	Hideo Kodama	Yonai	15 January 1940	
61	Ejii Yasui	2nd Konoe	22 July 1940	
62	Hiranuma Kiichirō	2nd Konoe	21 December 1940	
63	Harumichi Tanabe	3rd Konoe	18 July 1941	
64	Hideki Tōjō	Tōjō	18 October 1941	Concurrently Prime Minister, Minister of Munitions
65	Michio Yuzawa	Tōjō	17 February 1942	
66	Kisaburō Andō	Tōjō	20 April 1943	
67	Shigeo Ōdachi	Koiso	22 July 1944	
68	Genki Abe	Suzuki	7 April 1945	
69	Iwao Yamazaki	Higashikuni	17 August 1945	
70	Zenjirō Horikiri	Shidehara	9 October 1945	
71	Chūzō Mitsuji	Shidehara	13 January 1946	
72	Seiichi Ōmura	1st Yoshida	22 April 1946	
73	Etsujirō Uehara	1st Yoshida	31 January 1947	
—	Tetsu Katayama	Katayama	24 May 1947	Acting; concurrently Prime Minister
74	Kozaemon Kimura	Katayama	1 June 1947	Office abolished 31 December 1947
