= Inukai cabinet =

Cabinet of Japan (1931–1932)

Inukai Cabinet
- 29th Cabinet of Japan

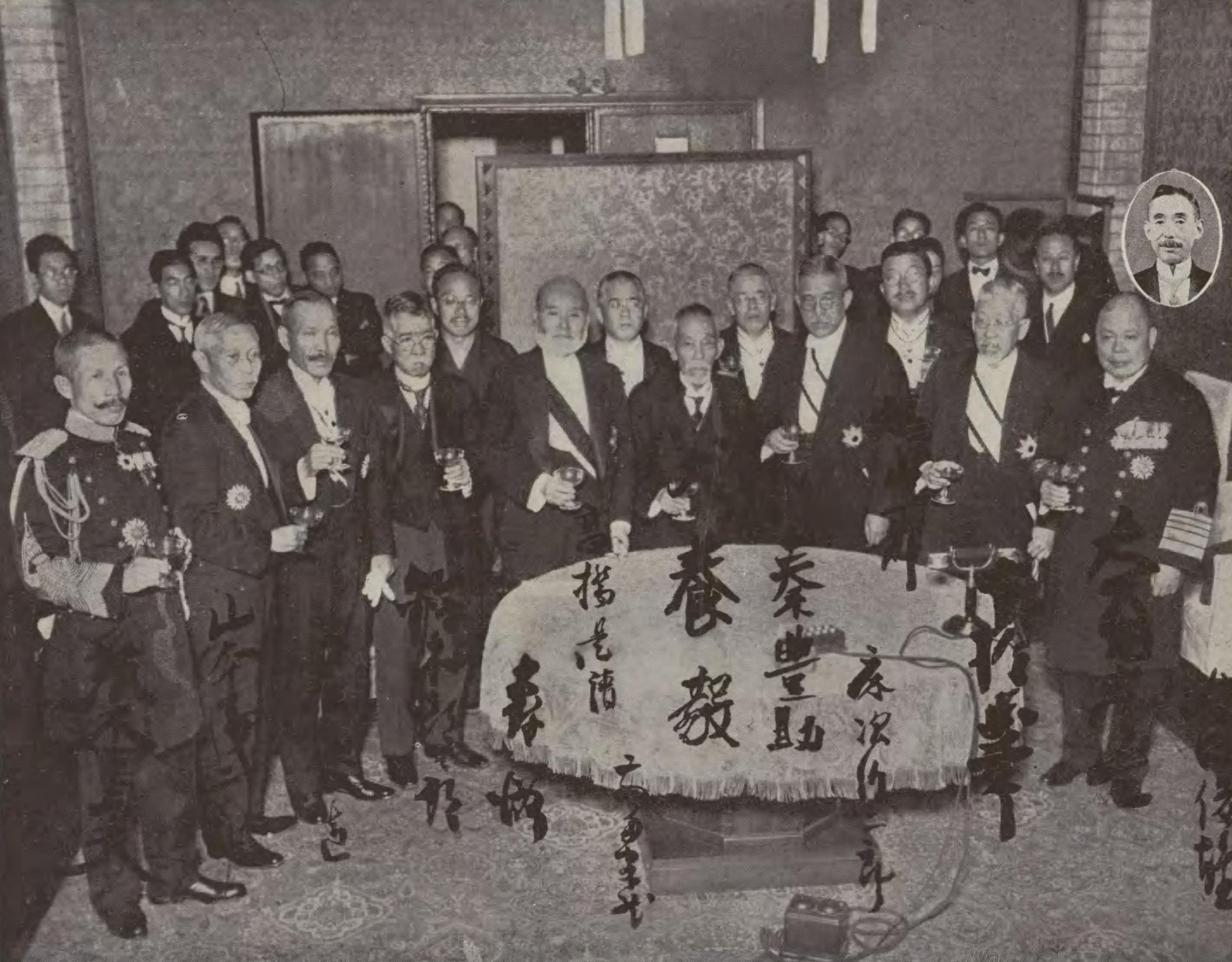
- Date formed: December 13, 1931
- Date dissolved: May 26, 1932

People and organisations
- Emperor: Shōwa
- Prime Minister: Inukai Tsuyoshi; Takahashi Korekiyo (acting)
- Member party: HoR Blocs: Rikken Seiyūkai; HoP Blocs: Kenkyūkai; Kōuyu Club

History
- Election: 1932 general election
- Legislature terms: 60th Imperial Diet; 61st Imperial Diet
- Predecessor: Second Wakatsuki Cabinet
- Successor: Saitō Cabinet

The Inukai Cabinet is the 29th Cabinet of Japan led by Inukai Tsuyoshi from December 13, 1931, to May 26, 1932.

== Cabinet ==
Ministers
Portfolio	Name	Political party	Term start	Term end
Prime Minister	Inukai Tsuyoshi	Rikken Seiyūkai	December 13, 1931	May 15, 1932
Prime Minister	Takahashi Korekiyo (acting) (Note: Following Prime Minister Inukai Tsuyoshi's assassination on May 15, 1932, Takahashi Korekiyo served as acting Prime Minister from May 15 to 26, 1932.)	Rikken Seiyūkai	May 15, 1932	May 26, 1932
Minister for Foreign Affairs	Inukai Tsuyoshi	Rikken Seiyūkai	December 13, 1931	January 14, 1932
Minister for Foreign Affairs	Kenkichi Yoshizawa	Independent	January 14, 1932	May 26, 1932
Minister of Home Affairs	Nakahashi Tokugorō	Rikken Seiyūkai	December 13, 1931	March 16, 1932
Minister of Home Affairs	Inukai Tsuyoshi	Rikken Seiyūkai	March 16, 1932	March 25, 1932
Minister of Home Affairs	Suzuki Kisaburō	Rikken Seiyūkai	March 25, 1932	May 26, 1932
Minister of Finance	Takahashi Korekiyo	Rikken Seiyūkai	December 13, 1931	May 26, 1932
Minister of the Army	Sadao Araki	Military (Army)	December 13, 1931	May 26, 1932
Minister of the Navy	Mineo Ōsumi	Military (Navy)	December 13, 1931	May 26, 1932
Minister of Justice	Suzuki Kisaburō	Rikken Seiyūkai	December 13, 1931	March 25, 1932
Minister of Justice	Kawamura Takeji	Independent	March 25, 1932	May 26, 1932
Minister of Education	Ichirō Hatoyama	Rikken Seiyūkai	December 13, 1931	May 26, 1932
Minister of Agriculture, Forestry and Fisheries	Yamamoto Teijirō	Rikken Seiyūkai	December 13, 1931	May 26, 1932
Minister of Commerce and Industry	Yonezō Maeda	Rikken Seiyūkai	December 13, 1931	May 26, 1932
Minister of Communications	Mitsuchi Chōzō	Rikken Seiyūkai	December 13, 1931	May 26, 1932
Minister of Railways	Tokonami Takejirō	Rikken Seiyūkai	December 13, 1931	May 26, 1932
Minister of Colonial Affairs	Toyosuke Hata	Rikken Seiyūkai	December 13, 1931	May 26, 1932
Chief Cabinet Secretary	Mori Kaku	Rikken Seiyūkai	December 13, 1931	May 26, 1932
Director-General of the Cabinet Legislation Bureau	Toshio Shimada	Rikken Seiyūkai	December 13, 1931	May 26, 1932
Parliamentary Vice-Ministers
Portfolio	Name	Political party	Term start	Term end
Parliamentary Vice-Minister for Foreign Affairs	Viscount Takanori Iwaki	Independent	December 15, 1931	May 26, 1932
Parliamentary Vice-Minister of Home Affairs	Matsuno Tsuruhei	Rikken Seiyūkai	December 15, 1931	May 26, 1932
Parliamentary Vice-Minister of Finance	Horikiri Zenbee	Rikken Seiyūkai	December 15, 1931	May 26, 1932
Parliamentary Vice-Minister of the Army	Wakamiya Sadao	Rikken Seiyūkai	December 15, 1931	May 26, 1932
Parliamentary Vice-Minister of the Navy	Count Hotta Masatsune	Independent	December 15, 1931	May 26, 1932
Parliamentary Vice-Minister of Justice	Kumagaya Naota	Rikken Seiyūkai	December 15, 1931	May 26, 1932
Parliamentary Vice-Minister of Education	Andō Masazumi	Rikken Seiyūkai	December 15, 1931	May 26, 1932
Parliamentary Vice-Minister of Agriculture, Forestry and Fisheries	Sunada Shigemasa	Rikken Seiyūkai	December 15, 1931	May 26, 1932
Parliamentary Vice-Minister of Commerce and Industry	Chikuhei Nakajima	Rikken Seiyūkai	December 15, 1931	May 26, 1932
Parliamentary Vice-Minister of Communications	Uchida Nobuya	Rikken Seiyūkai	December 15, 1931	May 26, 1932
Parliamentary Vice-Minister of Railways	Wakao Shōhachi	Independent	December 15, 1931	May 26, 1932
Parliamentary Vice-Minister of Colonial Affairs	Katō Kumeshirō	Rikken Seiyūkai	December 15, 1931	May 26, 1932
Parliamentary Undersecretaries
Portfolio	Name	Political party	Term start	Term end
Parliamentary Undersecretary for Foreign Affairs	Takahashi Kumajirō	Rikken Seiyūkai	December 15, 1931	May 26, 1932
Parliamentary Undersecretary of Home Affairs	Fujī Tatsuya	Rikken Seiyūkai	December 15, 1931	May 26, 1932
Parliamentary Undersecretary of Finance	Ōta Masataka	Rikken Seiyūkai	December 15, 1931	May 26, 1932
Parliamentary Undersecretary of the Army	Viscount Toki Akira	Independent	December 15, 1931	May 26, 1932
Parliamentary Undersecretary of the Navy	Nishimura Shigeo	Rikken Seiyūkai	December 15, 1931	May 26, 1932
Parliamentary Undersecretary of Justice	Nagawa Kanichi	Rikken Seiyūkai	December 15, 1931	May 26, 1932
Parliamentary Undersecretary of Education	Yamashita Taniji	Rikken Seiyūkai	December 15, 1931	May 26, 1932
Parliamentary Undersecretary of Agriculture, Forestry and Fisheries	Imai Takehiko	Rikken Seiyūkai	December 15, 1931	May 26, 1932
Parliamentary Undersecretary of Commerce and Industry	Katō Ryōgorō	Rikken Seiyūkai	December 15, 1931	May 26, 1932
Parliamentary Undersecretary of Communications	Sakai Daisuke	Rikken Seiyūkai	December 15, 1931	May 9, 1932
Parliamentary Undersecretary of Communications	Vacant		May 9, 1932	May 14, 1932
Parliamentary Undersecretary of Communications	Tōgō Minoru	Rikken Seiyūkai	May 14, 1932	May 26, 1932
Parliamentary Undersecretary of Railways	Noda Shunsaku	Rikken Seiyūkai	December 15, 1931	May 26, 1932
Parliamentary Undersecretary of Colonial Affairs	Makino Shizuo	Rikken Seiyūkai	December 15, 1931	May 26, 1932
