= Wakatsuki Cabinet =

Wakatsuki Cabinet may refer to:

- First Wakatsuki Cabinet, the Japanese government led by Wakatsuki Reijirō from 1926 to 1927
- Second Wakatsuki Cabinet, the Japanese government led by Wakatsuki Reijirō in 1931
