= Mizuno Rentarō =

Japanese politician (1868–1949)

- 水野 錬太郎
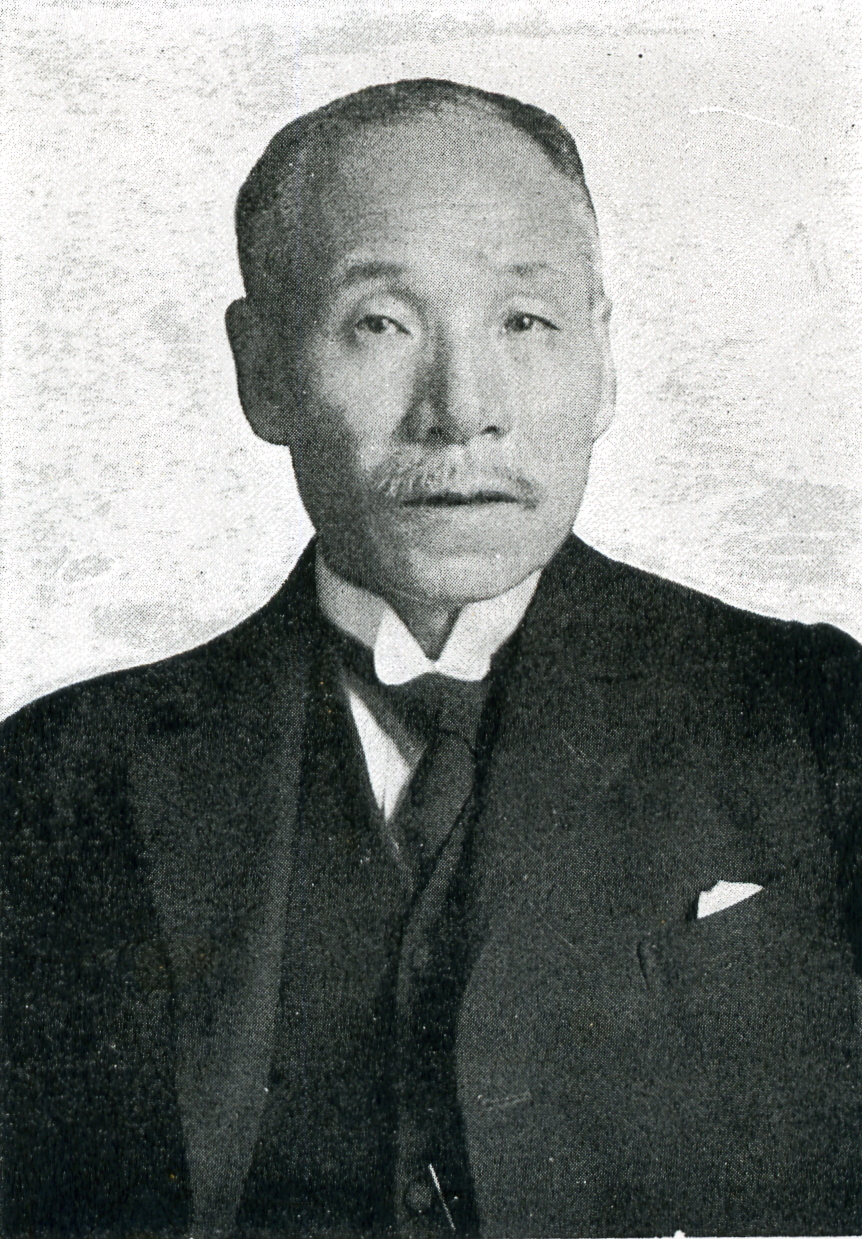
- Mizuno in 1932

Minister of Education
- In office 2 June 1927 – 25 May 1928
- Prime Minister: Tanaka Giichi
- Preceded by: Chūzō Mitsuchi
- Succeeded by: Kazue Shōda

Minister of Home Affairs
- In office 7 January 1924 – 11 June 1924
- Prime Minister: Kiyoura Keigo
- Preceded by: Gotō Shinpei
- Succeeded by: Wakatsuki Reijirō
- In office 12 June 1922 – 2 September 1923
- Prime Minister: Katō Tomosaburō
- Preceded by: Tokonami Takejirō
- Succeeded by: Gotō Shinpei
- In office 23 April 1918 – 29 September 1918
- Prime Minister: Terauchi Masatake
- Preceded by: Gotō Shinpei
- Succeeded by: Tokonami Takejirō

Chief of Political Affairs, Government-General of Korea
- In office 12 August 1919 – 12 June 1922
- Governor-General: Saitō Makoto
- Preceded by: Yamagata Isaburō
- Succeeded by: Chūichi Ariyoshi

Member of the House of Peers
- In office 5 December 1912 – 11 January 1946 Nominated by the Emperor

Personal details
- Born: 3 February 1868 Edo, Musashi, Japan
- Died: 25 November 1949 (aged 81)
- Party: Rikken Seiyūkai
- Education: Tokyo Imperial University

Mizuno Rentarō (水野錬太郎; 3 February 1868 – 25 November 1949) was a statesman, politician and cabinet minister in Taishō and early Shōwa period Japan.

== Early life ==
Mizuno was the son of a samurai in the service of Akita Domain, and was born at the Akita Domain's Edo residence in what is now the Asakusa area of Tokyo. He was a graduate of the law school of Tokyo Imperial University in 1892, where one of his classmates was future Prime Minister Wakatsuki Reijirō. Hozumi Nobushige introduced Mizuno to Shibusawa Eiichi, who offered him a position at his bank: however, Mizuno accepted Ume Kenjirō’s offer of an introduction to the Minister of Agriculture & Commerce and opted for a career as a government bureaucrat instead. In 1894, he changed to the Home Ministry, working initially for the Bureau of Mines, and subsequently serving in numerous other roles.

He was one of the Japanese delegates to the Berne Convention for the Protection of Literary and Artistic Works in Switzerland, which resulted in the promulgation of the initial version of the Copyright law of Japan in 1899.

== Political career ==
By the invitation of Hara Takashi, Mizuno joined the Rikken Seiyūkai and was appointed to the upper house of the Diet of Japan. Under the administration of Prime Minister Terauchi Masatake, he was appointed to the Cabinet as Home Minister for the first time.

From 1919 to 1922, Mizuno served as Parliamentary Commissioner of the Governor-General of Korea, a post which was effectively the head of the civilian administration of Korea under Japanese rule. Mizuno was regarded as particularly suited for this role, as he was familiar with the security apparatus for monitoring Korean residents in Japan and had experience in the suppression of civil disturbance due to his term as Home Minister during the Rice Riots of 1918. During his tenure in Korea, he greatly expanded the telephone infrastructure of the country, which had economic as well as security benefits, On 25 December 1920 Mizuno was awarded the Grand Cordon of the Order of the Rising Sun.

Mizuno returned to the Cabinet as Home Minister again under the Katō administration from 1922 to 1923, turning the post over to Gotō Shinpei the day after the 1923 Great Kantō earthquake.

Mizuno is infamous for his role in the 1923 Kantō Massacre. He stoked rumors that Koreans were committing crimes or taking revenge on the Japanese. An indiscriminate massacre of anyone suspected to be Korean followed. Over 6,000 Koreans were killed by Japanese civil militias.

At the end of 1923, after the Toranomon Incident, he was requested to return to the Cabinet as Home Minister for a third time, under the Keigo administration.

From 1927 to 1928, Mizuno served as Minister of Education. As Education Minister, he took steps to purge leftist professors from Japan's imperial universities and to ban radical leftist student groups.

In 1928, Prime Minister Tanaka Giichi attempted to appoint his close friend Fusanosuke Kuhara, a businessman noted for his radical right-wing politics and first-year member of the Diet to the post of Home Minister. Mizuno resigned in protest, which should have brought down Tanaka's Cabinet. However, Tanaka brought Mizuno a message from Emperor Hirohito asking Mizuno to withdraw his resignation. The incident caused an uproar in the House of Peers and threatened to precipitate a constitutional crisis, as this would mean that the Emperor was violating a long-standing rule of not interfering directly in politics and the action was perceived to be favorable to the Rikken Seiyūkai over their rivals, the Rikken Minseitō. Mizuno was forced to resign once again, and Tanaka fell increasingly out of favor with the Emperor; the incident was a major force in driving Tanaka from office in 1929.

== Later life ==
In his later years, Mizuno served as chairman of the Japanese Society for Rights of Authors, Composers and Publishers, and other posts. On 17 April 1938, Mizuno was awarded the Order of the Paulownia Flowers. At the end of World War II he was arrested by the Allied occupation forces and held in Sugamo Prison for Class-A war criminal charges for his position as honorary vice-chairman of the Dai-Nippon Koa Domei (Japan Pan-Asian Alliance), a war-time nationalist society, but was released on 1 September 1947 without coming to trial. He died on 25 November 1949 at the age of 81.

Political offices
Preceded by Chūzō Mitsuchi	Minister of Education; 2 June 1927 – 25 May 1928	Succeeded by Kazue Shōda
Preceded by Gotō Shinpei	Home Minister; 7 January 1924 – 11 June 1924	Succeeded by Wakatsuki Reijirō
Preceded by Tokonami Takejirō	Home Minister; 12 June 1922 – 2 September 1923	Succeeded by Gotō Shinpei
Preceded by Gotō Shinpei	Home Minister; 24 April 1918 – 29 September 1918	Succeeded by Tokonami Takejirō
