= Tama Cemetery =

Japanese cemetery

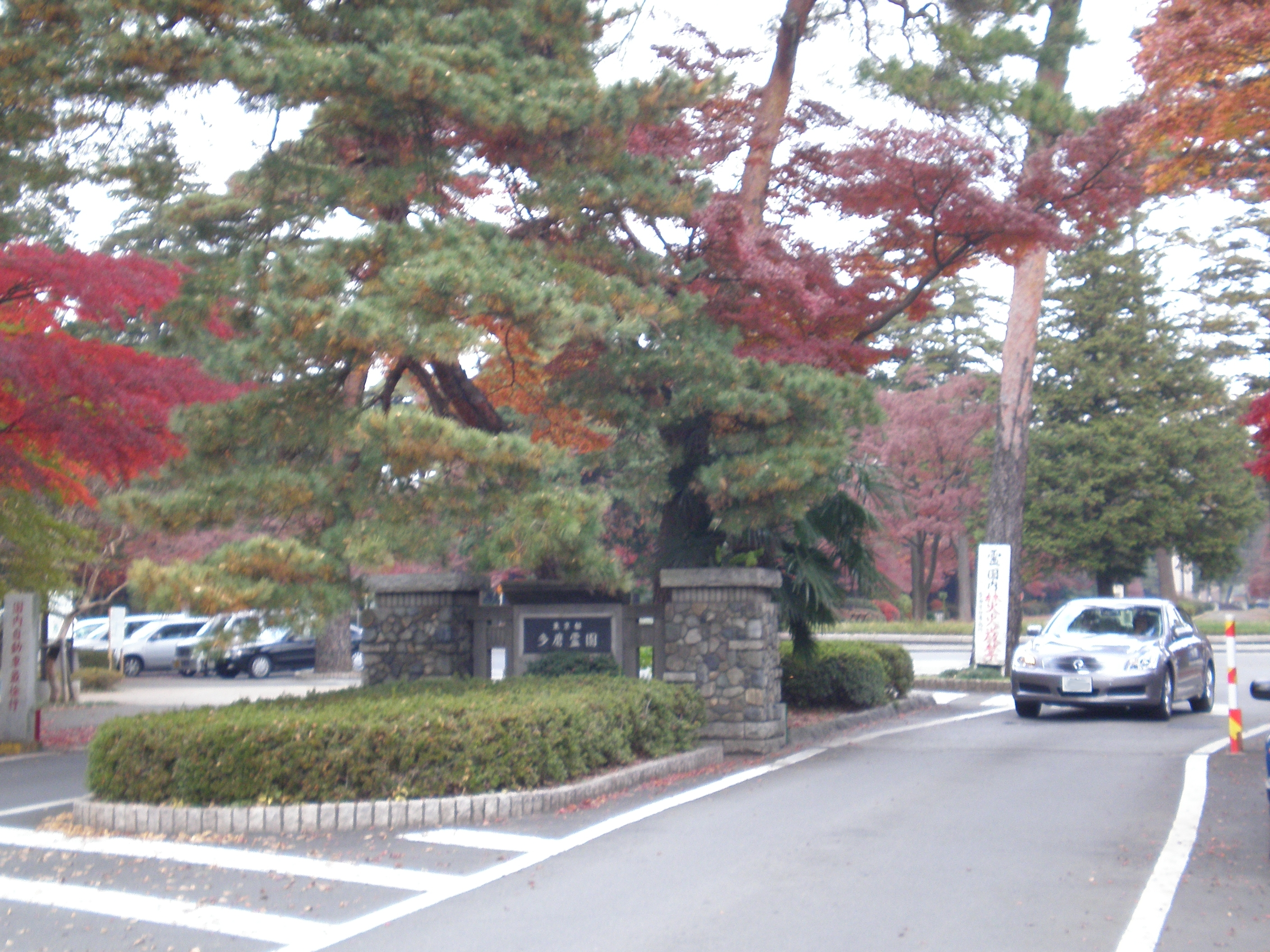
- Entry to Tama Cemetery in Fuchū, Tokyo
- Interactive map of Tama Cemetery

Details
- Established: 1923
- Location: Tokyo
- Country: Japan
- Coordinates: 35°41′00″N 139°30′37″E
- Type: Metropolitan
- Style: Park-type
- Owned by: City of Tokyo
- Size: 128 hectares (316 acres)

Tama Cemetery (多磨霊園, Tama Reien) in Tokyo is the largest municipal cemetery in Japan. It is split between the cities of Fuchu and Koganei within the Tokyo Metropolis. First established in April 1923 as Tama Graveyard (多磨墓地, Tama Bochi), it was redesignated Tama Cemetery in 1935. It is one of the largest green areas in Tokyo.

== History ==
Around 1900, Tokyo had five public cemeteries - Aoyama, Somei, Yanaka, Zoshigaya and Kameido. As the population of Tokyo grew, and cemetery space grew scarce, there was a need to build a cemetery outside of the city limits of Tokyo. In 1919, city park manager Kiyoshi Inoshita issued a plan to establish a large park/cemetery to the north, east and west of Tokyo. Tama, to the west of Tokyo, was selected in 1920, with construction started two years later. It was said that the site was chosen because of access to transportation infrastructure, such as the Kōshū Kaidō, Keiō Line, Seibu Tamagawa Line, and Chūō Main Line. The cemetery was opened in 1923. The planned northern and eastern cemeteries are Sodaira and Yahashira, respectively.

In 1934, Gensui The Marquis Tōgō, the naval war hero, was buried in Tama Cemetery, spreading the popularity of the cemetery. During World War II, Kawasaki Ki-61 from nearby Chofu Airfield were hidden and repaired in the cemetery. Some facilities in the cemetery still have bullet holes from U.S. strafing.

Use of the cemetery increased, with the last open spot used in 1963. Since 1963, only reburials and other such uses have opened up new spaces. In 1962 a green lawn-type cemetery was added, and in 1993, Mitama Hall, a columbarium, was added.

== Notable interments ==
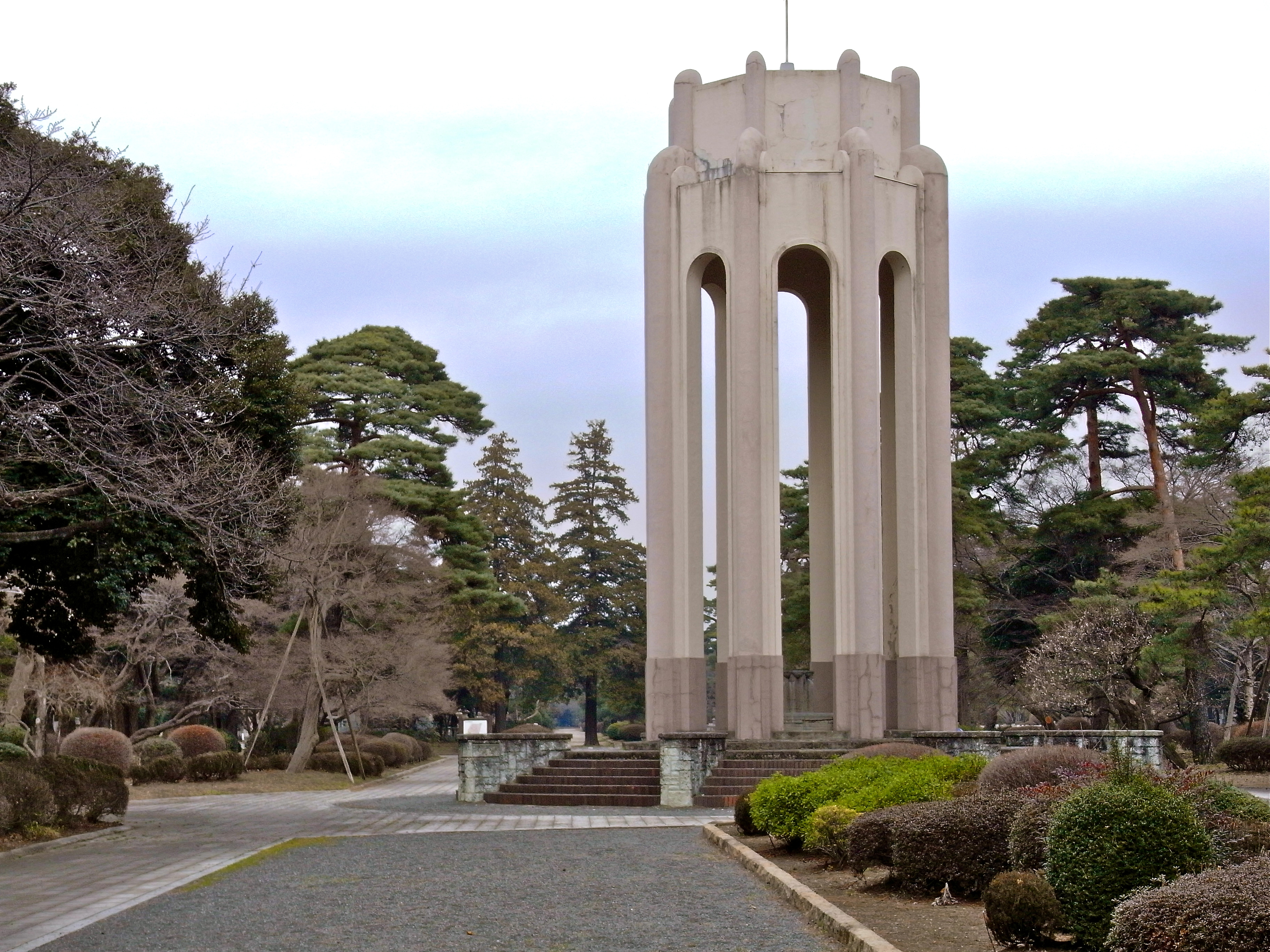
Fountain in Tama Cemetery

- Kunio Miura (1895–1963), politician and bureaucrat
- Aikawa Yoshisuke (1880–1967), the founder and first president of the Nissan zaibatsu between 1931 and 1945
- Tom Dakin Cochrane (1868–1937), one of the founding members of Universal Pictures and Pa-Sho. He also launch the distribution channel for Universal throughout Asia and Paramount's distribution channel in Japan.
- General Anami Korechika (1887–1945), a senior commander in the Imperial Japanese Army during World War II, and War Minister at the surrender of Japan. Although outspoken against the Japanese surrender to Allied forces in 1945, he is noted for his stance against the Kyūjō coup attempt. Due to his sense of honour and respect for the emperor's wish to end the war, he committed seppuku the morning after he joined in signing surrender documents.
- General Baron Araki Sadao (1877–1966), a senior commander in the Imperial Japanese Army before World War II and one of the principal nationalist right-wing political theorists in the late Japanese Empire
- Arita Hachirō (1884–1965), the Minister for Foreign Affairs for three terms, who is believed to have originated the concept of the Greater East Asia Co-Prosperity Sphere
- Azuma Ryōtarō (1893–1983), Governor of Tokyo from 1959 to 1967
- Vice Admiral Fukudome Shigeru (1891–1971), a senior commander in the Imperial Japanese Navy during World War II
- Lt-General Furushō Motoo (1882–1940), a senior commander in the Imperial Japanese Army
- Baron Tanaka Giichi (1864–1929), a general in the Imperial Japanese Army, and the 26th Prime Minister of Japan from 20 April 1927 to 2 July 1929
- Hara Shūjirō (1871–1934), a politician who served as Minister for Colonial Affairs in the Empire of Japan
- General Hayashi Senjūrō (1876–1943), the Imperial Japanese Army commander of the Chosen Army of Japan in Korea during the Mukden incident and the invasion of Manchuria, and 33rd Prime Minister of Japan from 2 February 1937 to 4 June 1937
- Gensui The Marquis Tōgō Heihachirō (1848–1934), a Gensui (or 'marshal-admiral') in the Imperial Japanese Navy and one of Japan's greatest naval heroes
- Baron Honjō Shigeru (1876–1945), a general in the Imperial Japanese Army during the early period of the Second Sino-Japanese War
- General Ichinohe Hyoe (1855–1931), a senior commander in the Imperial Japanese Army

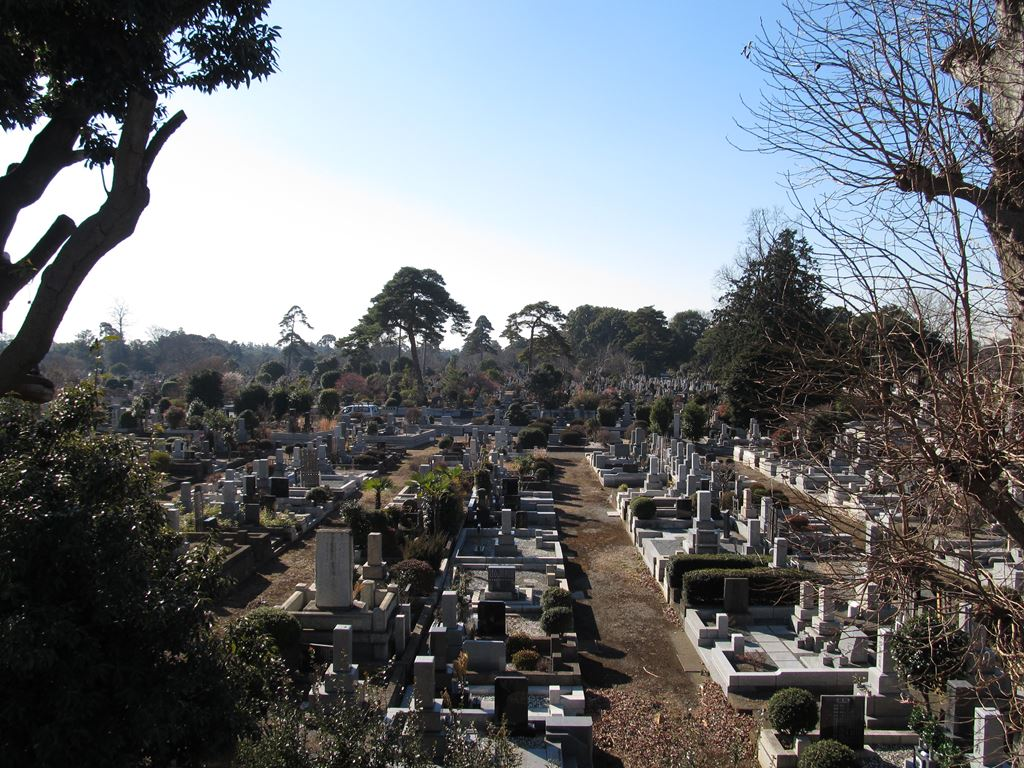
Tama Cemetery is a significant urban open space in the Tokyo metropolitan area

- Ino Hiroya (1891–1980), a politician and cabinet minister in Japan
- Lt-General Inoue Masakichi (1886–1975), a senior commander in the Imperial Japanese Army during World War II
- Admiral Inoue Shigeyoshi (1889–1975), a senior commander in the Imperial Japanese Navy during World War II and a Vice-Minister of the Navy
- Kanemitsu Tsuneo (1877–1955), politician and cabinet minister in the Empire of Japan
- Lt-General Kawagishi Bunzaburō (1882–1957), a senior commander in the Imperial Japanese Army during the early stages of the Second Sino-Japanese War
- Baron Den Kenjirō (1855–1930), a cabinet minister in the pre-war government of the Empire of Japan and the 8th Japanese Governor-General of Taiwan from October 29, 1919, to September 1923
- Baron Hiranuma Kiichirō (1867–1952), a prominent pre–World War II right-wing Japanese politician and the 35th Prime Minister of Japan from 5 January 1939 to 30 August 1939
- Kinoshita Mokutarō (1885–1945), a Japanese author, Dramaturge, poet, art historian and literary critic
- Kishida Ryūsei (1891–1929), a Taishō and Shōwa period painter
- Kitagawa Fuyuhiko (1900–1990), a Japanese poet and film critic
- Count Kodama Hideo (1876–1947), a politician, and wartime cabinet minister in the Empire of Japan
- Gensui Koga Mineichi (1885–1944), a commander-in-chief of the Imperial Japanese Navy's Combined Fleet
- Kurata Hyakuzō (1891–1943), a Japanese essayist and playwright on religious subjects that was active during the Taishō and early Shōwa periods
- Vice Admiral Kurita Takeo (1889–1977), a senior commander in the Imperial Japanese Navy during World War II
- Matsuda Genji (1876–1936), a politician and cabinet minister in the Empire of Japan
- Mishima Tokushichi (1893–1975), a Japanese metallurgist

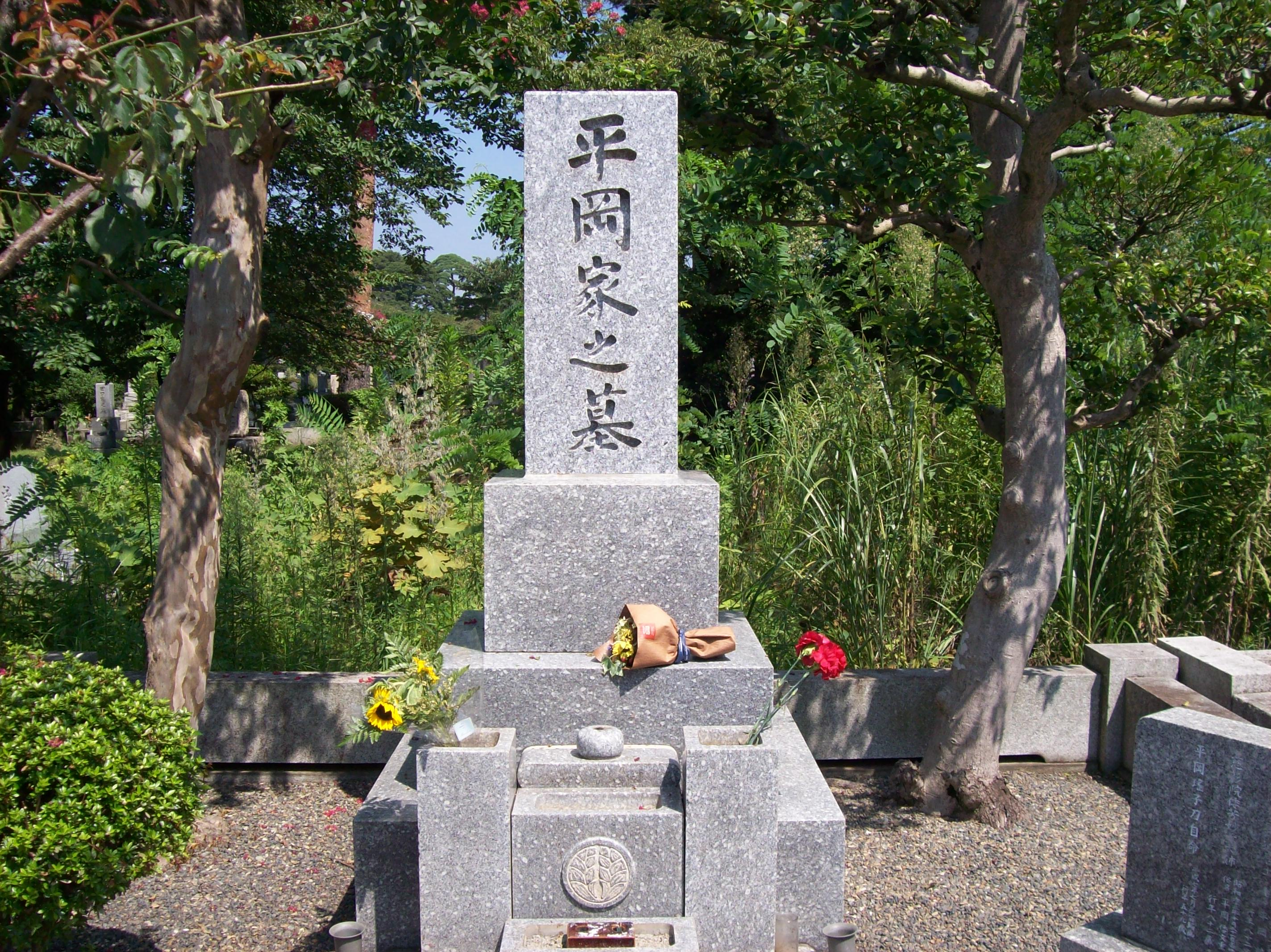
Grave of Mishima Yukio

- Mishima Yukio (1925–1970), a Japanese author, poet, playwright, actor, and film director
- Nakajima Chikuhei (1884–1949), founder of the Nakajima Aircraft Company and a cabinet minister for several posts
- Noda Kōgo (1893–1968), a Japanese screenwriter most famous for collaborating with film director Ozu Yasujirō
- Admiral Okada Keisuke (1868–1952), senior naval commander who served as the 31st Prime Minister of Japan from 8 July 1934 to 9 March 1936
- Lt-General Sakurai Shōzō (1889–1985), a senior commander in the Imperial Japanese Army during the Second Sino-Japanese War and World War II
- Admiral Baron Kataoka Shichirō (1854–1920), an early senior commander in the Imperial Japanese Navy

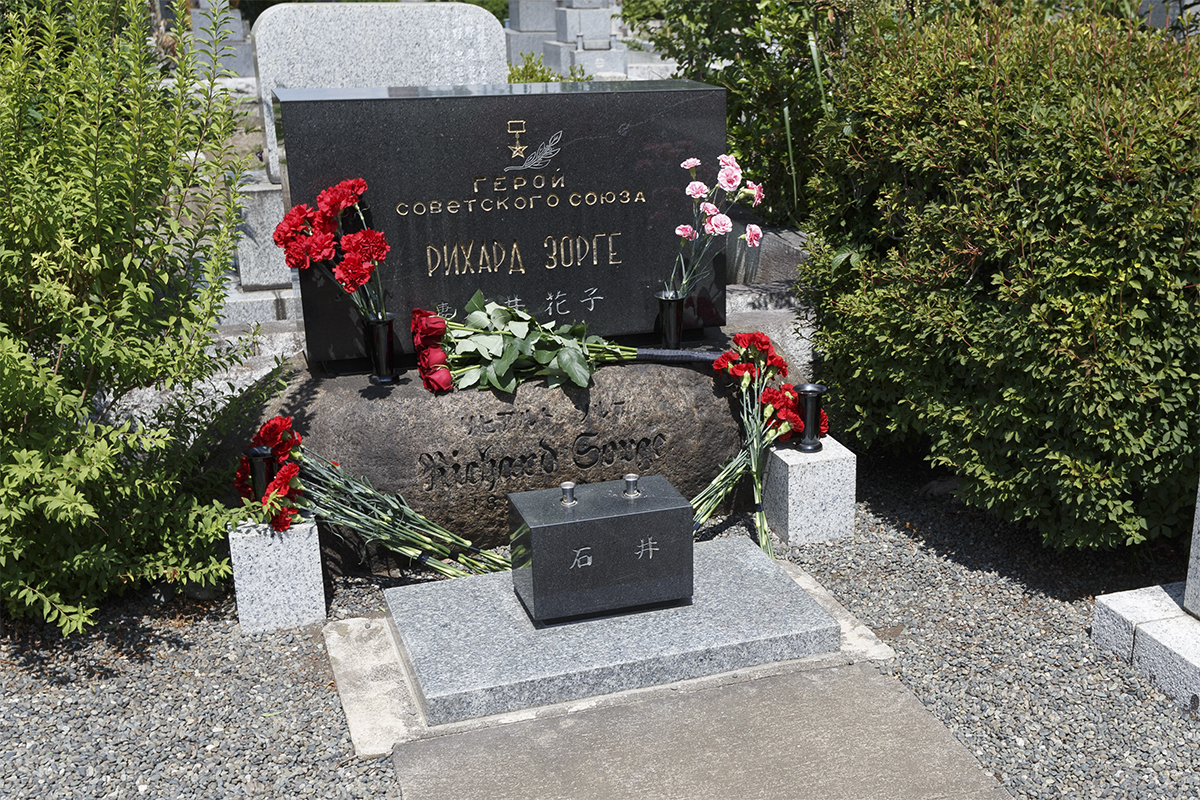
Grave of Richard Sorge

- Richard Sorge (1895–1944), a German communist and spy who worked for the Soviet Union
- Victor Starffin (1916–1957), the first professional baseball pitcher in Japan to win three hundred games
- Gensui Sugiyama Hajime (1880–1945), Chief of the Imperial Army General Staff Office and, later, Minister of War in the Imperial Japanese Government during World War II between 1937 and 1944
- Taniguchi Masaharu (1893–1985), a Japanese New Thought leader, founder of the Seicho-no-Ie religious movement
- Lt-General Tatekawa Yoshitsugu (1880–1945), a senior commander in the Imperial Japanese Army in World War II and ambassador to the Soviet Union that concluded the 1941 Soviet–Japanese Neutrality Pact
- Tokonami Takejirō (1866–1935), a Japanese politician who served as Home Minister and Railway Minister
- Tomoyuki Yamashita (1885–1946), a Japanese general, dubbed "The Tiger of Malaya", executed for war crimes
- Gensui The Marquis Saigō Tsugumichi (1843–1902), a Japanese politician and admiral in the Meiji period
- Admiral Tsukahara Nishizō (1887–1966), a senior commander in the Imperial Japanese Navy during World War II

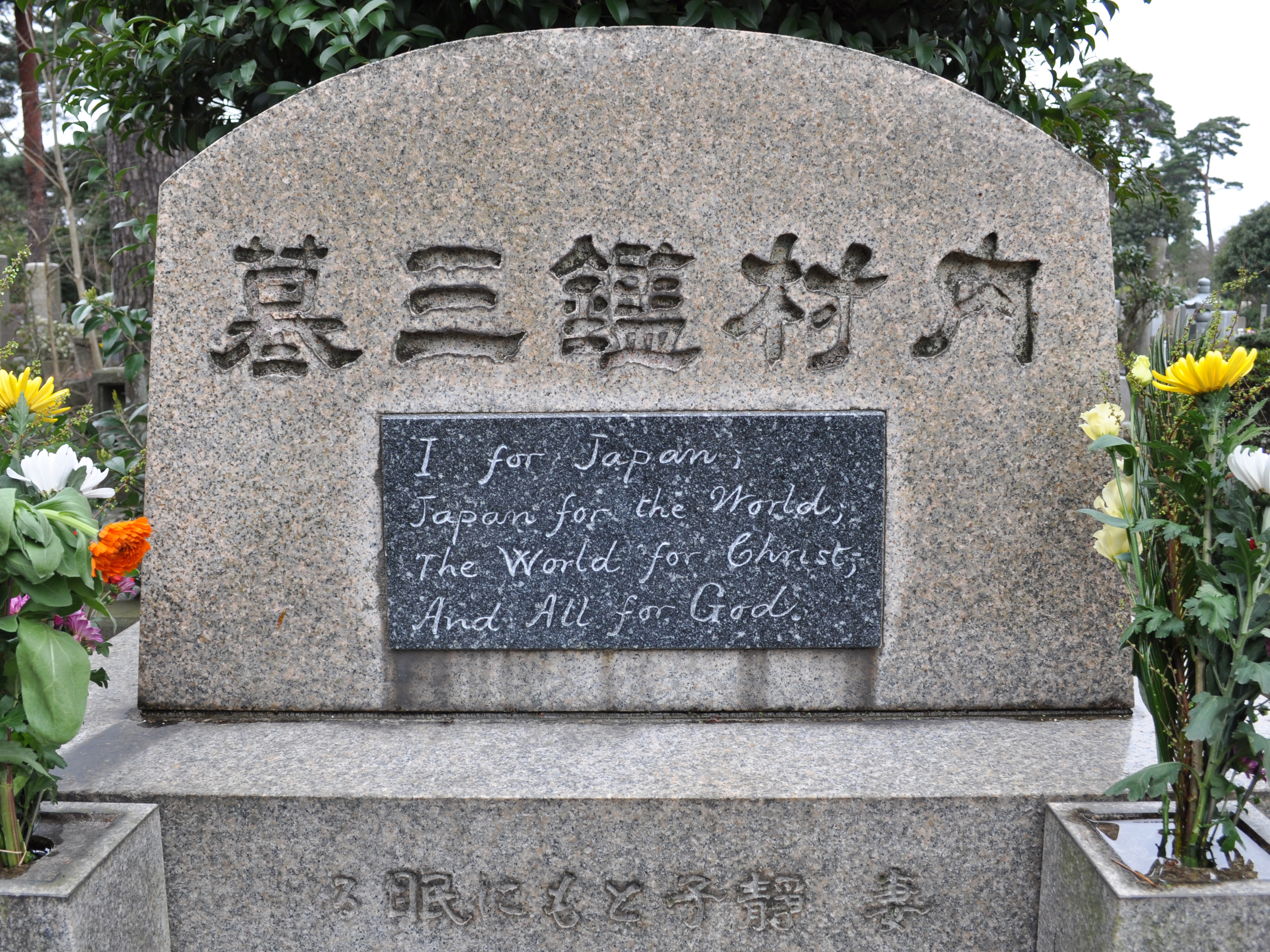
Tombstone of Uchimura Kanzō

- Uchimura Kanzō (1861–1930), author, Christian evangelist, and the founder of the Non-church Movement in the Meiji and Taishō period
- General Ugaki Kazushige (1868–1956), a senior commander in the Imperial Japanese Army, the 5th principal of Takushoku University, and twice Governor-General of Korea
- General Ushiroku Jun (1884–1973), a senior commander in the Imperial Japanese Army
- Vice Admiral Baron Shibayama Yahachi (1850–1927), a senior commander in the early Imperial Japanese Navy
- Yamamoto Jōtarō (1867–1936), a bureaucrat, politician and entrepreneur in late Meiji and early Taishō period
- Yamahata Yōsuke (1917–1966), a Japanese photographer best known for extensively photographing Nagasaki the day after it was bombed

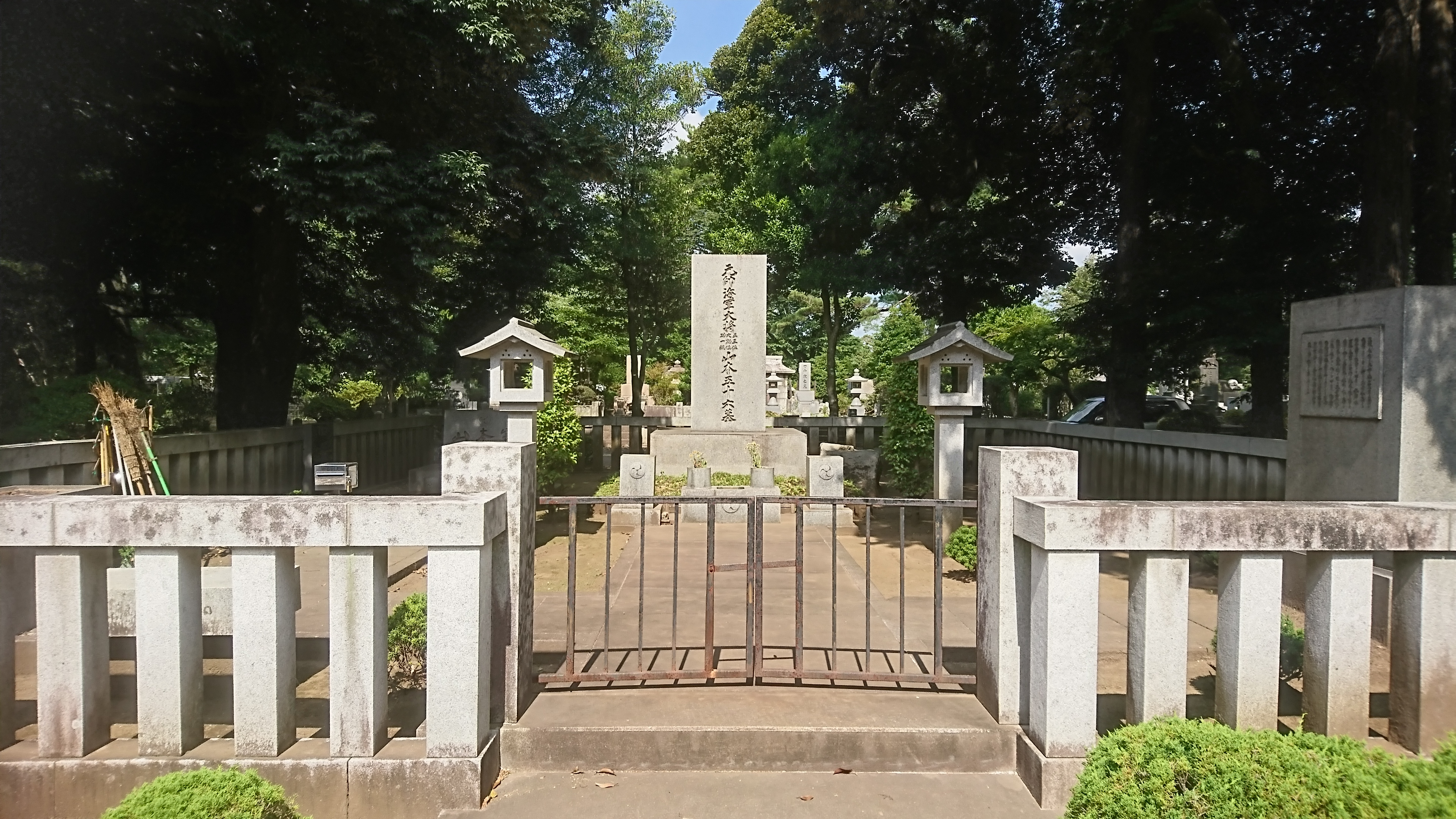
Grave of Isoroku Yamamoto

- Gensui Yamamoto Isoroku (1884–1943), a Japanese Marshal Admiral and the commander-in-chief of the Combined Fleet during World War II
- Yosano Akiko (1878- 1942), Japanese author, poet, pioneering feminist, pacifist, and social reformer
- Admiral Yoshida Zengo (1885–1966), a senior commander in the Imperial Japanese Navy during World War II
- General Kusunose Yukihiko (1858–1927), a senior commander in the early Imperial Japanese Army
- Shōhei Ōoka (1909–1988), novelist, literary critic, and translator of French literature. Best known for Nobi (Fires on the Plain, 1951).
- Edogawa Ranpo (1894–1965), Japanese author and critic who played a major role in the development of Japanese mystery fiction.
- Machiko Soga (1938–2006), Japanese voice actress and actress best known for her villainous roles in tokusatsu
- Jun Seba (1974–2010), Japanese record producer, DJ, composer, and arranger, better known by his stage name Nujabes
- Rash Behari Bose (1886–1945), Indian Revolutionary Activist and Father of Shinjuku Nakamuraya "Indian Curry" West Bengal
- Yasuo Yamada (1932–1995), Japanese singer, narrator and voice actor. Known for voicing Lupin III and for the Japanese dubbing of Kermit the Frog and Clint Eastwood.
- Seiichirō Yasui (1891–1962), Japanese politician and bureaucrat who served as Governor of Tokyo from 1947 to 1959.

== See also ==
- Tama-reien Station on the Keiō Line
- Tama Station, formerly named "Tamabochimae" ("In front of the Tama Cemetery") on the Seibu Tamagawa Line
