= Hyakuzō Kurata =

Kurata Hyakuzō
- 倉田 百三
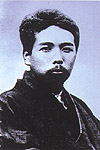
- Born: 23 February 1891; Shōbara, Hiroshima, Japan
- Died: 12 February 1943 (aged 51); Tokyo, Japan
- Resting place: Tama Cemetery, Fuchū, Tokyo, Japan
- Occupation: Writer
- Writing career
- Language: Japanese
- Genres: essays, stage plays
- Literary movement: Shirakaba

Hyakuzō Kurata (倉田 百三, Kurata Hyakuzō; 23 February 1891 – 12 February 1943) was a Japanese essayist and playwright who wrote on religious subjects. He was active during the Taishō and early Shōwa periods of Japan.

== Biography ==
Kurata was born in what is now rural Shōbara city, Hiroshima Prefecture, to a wealthy merchant family. He graduated from the No.1 High School in Tokyo and lived in a cottage on the banks of Ueno Pond. Highly influenced by the writings of Nishida Kitarō and his concepts of religious syncretism, he traveled to Kyoto to meet the philosopher in 1912. However, in 1913, Kurata was forced to leave Tokyo for health reasons, as he was suffering from both lung and bone tuberculosis and venereal disease. After a period in a hospital in Hiroshima, he traveled extensively around the Inland Sea region. He also became interested in the writings of philosopher and cult-leader Nishida Tenko, who had created an agrarian commune based on a mixture of Daoism, Christianity, Buddhism, and pacifism, and whose teachings were attracting a wide following in the slum areas near Japan's major cities. Nishida accepted Kurata as a follower in December 1915, and he came to the commune with his nurse and lover, Haru Kanda, who gave birth to his son in March 1917. However, Kurata was not physically strong enough for work at the commune, and his health quickly deteriorated.

In 1917, Kurata wrote Shukke to sono deshi ("The Priest and his Apprentice"), a stage play about the 13th-century Buddhist priest Shinran, which quickly became a best-seller. After initially contributing articles on philosophy and religion to the Shirakaba literary journal, he became acquainted with Mushanokōji Saneatsu. However, Mushanokoji had very little regard for Nishida Tenko and his ideas, and was somewhat indifferent to Kurata.

In July 1918, suffering from nervous stress, Kurata was hospitalized in Fukuoka. In January, still mostly bedridden, he moved to a Buddhist temple in Fukuoka and joined Mushanokōji's commune, Atarashiki-mura, as an external member. He organized public lectures, held concerts, and even installed a printing press near his bed. Thinking that Kurata was on his deathbed, Nishida sent a mortuary tablet with Kurata's posthumous name inscribed on it, which Kurata accepted with somewhat mixed feelings, as he wrote in a letter to Masao Kume in March 1919.

He also wrote Ai to ninshiki to no shuppatsu ("The Beginning of Love and Understanding", 1921), a collection of essays on diverse subjects ranging from love and sex to religion that became a classic with young people in pre-war Japan.

However, Kurata had a falling out with the Shirakaba group in 1922, after Mushanokōji joined critics in lambasting his most recent play Chichi no Shimpai ("A Father's Worry", 1921), and the Atarashiki-mura faced bankruptcy. His private life also attracted unfavorable press, as he was living polygamously with three women under the same roof. Politically, Kurata made a sharp turn to the religious right and embraced the concepts of fascism, advocating a theocracy based on the teachings of Shinran.

Kurata died in 1943 at his home in Magome, Tokyo, and his grave is in Tama Cemetery, at Fuchū, Tokyo.

== See also ==
- List of Japanese authors
