= Second Wakatsuki cabinet =

Cabinet of Japan (April 14 – December 13, 1931)

Second Wakatsuki Cabinet
- 28th Cabinet of Japan

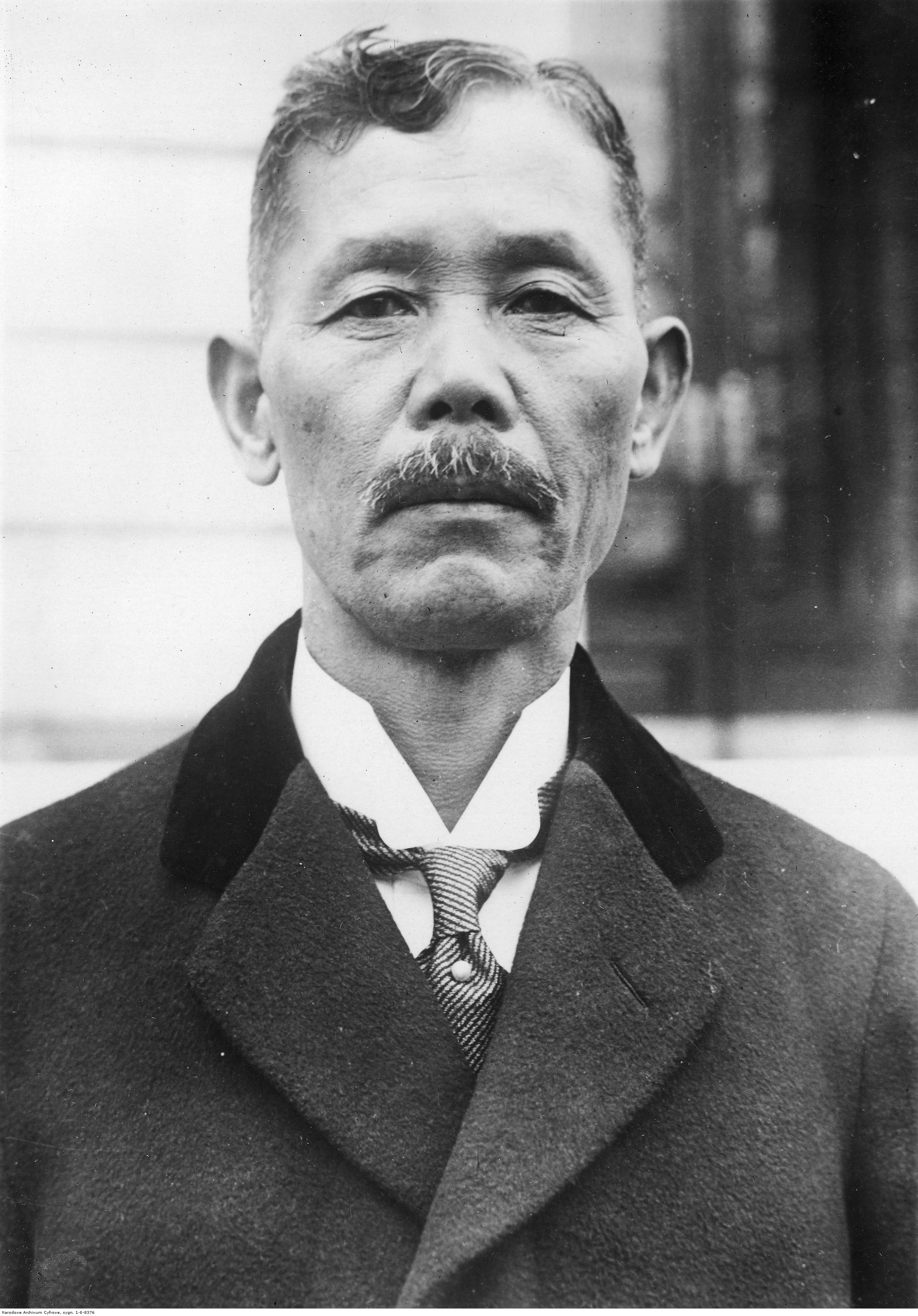
- Prime Minister Wakatsuki Reijirō
- Date formed: April 14, 1931
- Date dissolved: December 13, 1931

People and organisations
- Emperor: Shōwa
- Prime Minister: Wakatsuki Reijirō
- Member party: HoR Blocs: Rikken Minseitō; HoP Blocs: Kenkyūkai; Kōseikai; Dōwakai; Dōseikai

History
- Predecessor: Hamaguchi Cabinet
- Successor: Inukai Cabinet

The Second Wakatsuki Cabinet is the 28th Cabinet of Japan led by Wakatsuki Reijirō from April 14 to December 13, 1931.

== Cabinet ==
Ministers
| Portfolio | Name | Political party | Term start | Term end |
|---|---|---|---|---|
| Prime Minister | Baron Wakatsuki Reijirō | Rikken Minseitō | April 14, 1931 | December 13, 1931 |
| Minister for Foreign Affairs | Baron Kijūrō Shidehara | Independent | April 14, 1931 | December 13, 1931 |
| Minister of Home Affairs | Adachi Kenzō | Rikken Minseitō | April 14, 1931 | December 13, 1931 |
| Minister of Finance | Junnosuke Inoue | Rikken Minseitō | April 14, 1931 | December 13, 1931 |
| Minister of the Army | Jirō Minami | Military (Army) | April 14, 1931 | December 13, 1931 |
| Minister of the Navy | Baron Kiyokazu Abo | Military (Navy) | April 14, 1931 | December 13, 1931 |
| Minister of Justice | Viscount Watanabe Chifuyu | Independent | April 14, 1931 | December 13, 1931 |
| Minister of Education | Tanaka Ryūzō | Rikken Minseitō | April 14, 1931 | December 13, 1931 |
| Minister of Agriculture, Forestry and Fisheries | Machida Chūji | Rikken Minseitō | April 14, 1931 | December 13, 1931 |
| Minister of Commerce and Industry | Yukio Sakurauchi | Rikken Minseitō | April 14, 1931 | December 13, 1931 |
| Minister of Communications | Koizumi Matajirō | Rikken Minseitō | April 14, 1931 | December 13, 1931 |
| Minister of Railways | Egi Tasuku | Rikken Minseitō | April 14, 1931 | September 10, 1931 |
| Minister of Railways | Shūjirō Hara | Rikken Minseitō | September 10, 1931 | December 13, 1931 |
| Minister of Colonial Affairs | Shūjirō Hara | Rikken Minseitō | April 14, 1931 | September 10, 1931 |
| Minister of Colonial Affairs | Baron Wakatsuki Reijirō | Rikken Minseitō | September 10, 1931 | December 13, 1931 |
| Chief Cabinet Secretary | Kawasaki Takukichi | Rikken Minseitō | April 14, 1931 | December 13, 1931 |
| Director-General of the Cabinet Legislation Bureau | Takeuchi Sakuhei | Rikken Minseitō | April 14, 1931 | November 8, 1931 |
| Director-General of the Cabinet Legislation Bureau | Saitō Takao | Rikken Minseitō | November 8, 1931 | December 13, 1931 |
Parliamentary Vice-Ministers
| Portfolio | Name | Political party | Term start | Term end |
| Parliamentary Vice-Minister for Foreign Affairs | Baron Yabuki Shōzō | Independent | April 15, 1931 | December 13, 1931 |
| Parliamentary Vice-Minister of Home Affairs | Furuya Yoshitaka | Rikken Minseitō | April 15, 1931 | December 13, 1931 |
| Parliamentary Vice-Minister of Finance | Den Akira | Rikken Minseitō | April 15, 1931 | December 13, 1931 |
| Parliamentary Vice-Minister of the Army | Viscount Itō Jiromaru | Independent | April 15, 1931 | December 13, 1931 |
| Parliamentary Vice-Minister of the Navy | Makiyama Kōzō | Rikken Minseitō | April 15, 1931 | December 13, 1931 |
| Parliamentary Vice-Minister of Justice | Yatsunami Takeji | Rikken Minseitō | April 15, 1931 | December 13, 1931 |
| Parliamentary Vice-Minister of Education | Kintarō Yokoyama | Rikken Minseitō | April 15, 1931 | December 13, 1931 |
| Parliamentary Vice-Minister of Agriculture, Forestry and Fisheries | Nishimura Tanjirō | Rikken Minseitō | April 15, 1931 | December 13, 1931 |
| Parliamentary Vice-Minister of Commerce and Industry | Matsumura Giichi | Independent | April 15, 1931 | December 13, 1931 |
| Parliamentary Vice-Minister of Communications | Koike Nirō | Rikken Minseitō | April 15, 1931 | December 13, 1931 |
| Parliamentary Vice-Minister of Railways | Suematsu Kaiichirō | Rikken Minseitō | April 15, 1931 | December 13, 1931 |
| Parliamentary Vice-Minister of Colonial Affairs | Murayasu Shinkurō | Rikken Minseitō | April 15, 1931 | December 13, 1931 |
Parliamentary Undersecretaries
| Portfolio | Name | Political party | Term start | Term end |
| Parliamentary Undersecretary for Foreign Affairs | Tanaka Takeo | Rikken Minseitō | April 15, 1931 | December 13, 1931 |
| Parliamentary Undersecretary of Home Affairs | Koyama Tanizō | Rikken Minseitō | April 15, 1931 | December 13, 1931 |
| Parliamentary Undersecretary of Finance | Maeda Fusanosuke | Rikken Minseitō | April 15, 1931 | December 13, 1931 |
| Parliamentary Undersecretary of the Army | Hisa Shōhei | Rikken Minseitō | April 15, 1931 | December 13, 1931 |
| Parliamentary Undersecretary of the Navy | Viscount Nabeshima Naotada | Independent | April 15, 1931 | December 13, 1931 |
| Parliamentary Undersecretary of Justice | Tozawa Tamijūrō | Rikken Minseitō | April 15, 1931 | December 13, 1931 |
| Parliamentary Undersecretary of Education | Kudō Tetsuo | Rikken Minseitō | April 15, 1931 | December 13, 1931 |
| Parliamentary Undersecretary of Agriculture, Forestry and Fisheries | Okamoto Jitsutarō | Rikken Minseitō | April 15, 1931 | December 13, 1931 |
| Parliamentary Undersecretary of Commerce and Industry | Sakurai Hyōgorō | Rikken Minseitō | April 15, 1931 | December 13, 1931 |
| Parliamentary Undersecretary of Communications | Hirakawa Matsutarō | Rikken Minseitō | April 15, 1931 | December 13, 1931 |
| Parliamentary Undersecretary of Railways | Nakajima Yadanji | Rikken Minseitō | April 15, 1931 | December 13, 1931 |
| Parliamentary Undersecretary of Colonial Affairs | Sugiura Takeo | Rikken Minseitō | April 15, 1931 | December 13, 1931 |
