= Genji Matsuda =

Japanese politician

- 松田 源治
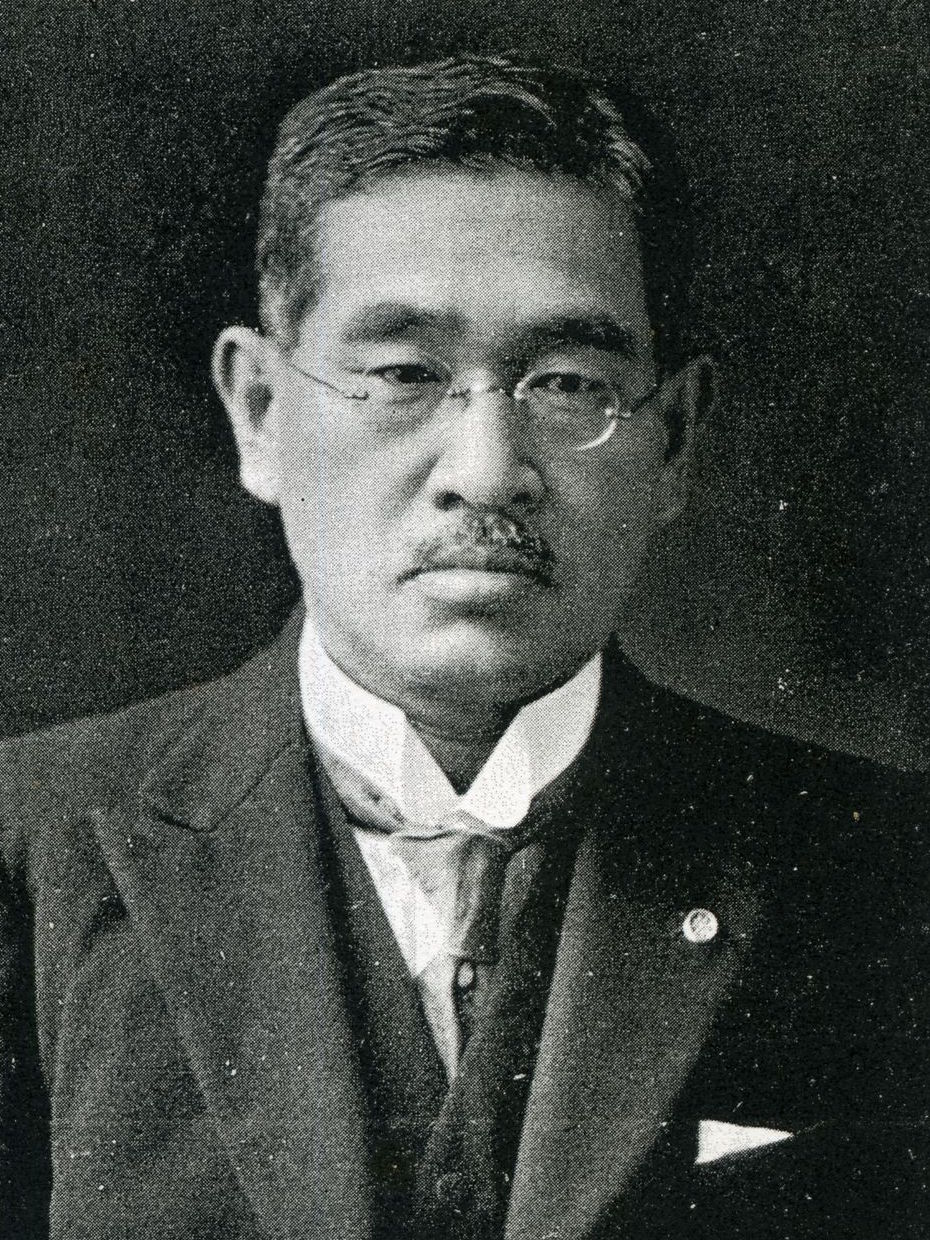

Minister of Education
- In office 8 July 1934 – 2 February 1936
- Prime Minister: Keisuke Okada
- Preceded by: Ichirō Hatoyama; Saitō Makoto (acting)
- Succeeded by: Kawasaki Takukichi

Minister of Colonial Affairs
- In office 2 July 1929 – 14 April 1931
- Prime Minister: Hamaguchi Osachi
- Preceded by: Tanaka Giichi
- Succeeded by: Shūjirō Hara

Vice Speaker of the House of Representatives
- In office 17 February 1923 – 31 January 1924
- Speaker: Kasuya Gizo
- Preceded by: Kasuya Gizo
- Succeeded by: Koizumi Matajirō

Member of the House of Representatives
- In office 29 November 1915 – 2 February 1936
- Preceded by: Narikiyo Hiroe
- Succeeded by: Ichinomiya Fusajirō
- Constituency: Ōita Prefecture (1915–1920); Ōita 7th (1920–1928); Ōita 1st (1928)
- In office 15 May 1908 – 25 December 1914
- Preceded by: Toshitaro Korenaga
- Succeeded by: Narikiyo Hiroe
- Constituency: Ōita Prefecture

Personal details
- Born: 4 October 1876 Usa, Ōita, Japan
- Died: 2 February 1936 (aged 59)
- Resting place: Tama Cemetery
- Party: Rikken Minseitō (1927–1936)
- Other political affiliations: Rikken Seiyūkai (1908–1924); Seiyūhontō (1924–1927)
- Education: Nihon University

Genji Matsuda (松田 源治, Matsuda Genji; October 4, 1876 – February 1, 1936), was a politician and cabinet minister in the Empire of Japan, serving as a member of the Lower House of the Diet of Japan nine times, and twice holding cabinet-level posts.

== Biography ==
Matsuda was born in Usa District, Ōita Prefecture, and was trained as a lawyer, graduating from the predecessor of Chuo University. He was first elected to the Lower House as a representative from Oita Prefecture in 1908. Joining the Rikken Seiyūkai political party, he switched to the Seiyūhontō in 1924, and Rikken Minseitō in 1927.

In October 1929, Matsuda was picked to be Minister of Colonial Affairs under the Hamaguchi administration, holding that post until April 1931. On July 8, 1934, he became Minister of Education under the Okada administration. During his tenure as Education Minister, he gained notoriety for a speech made on August 29, 1934, in which he blasted the use of the foreign words "mama" and "papa" by Japanese children when traditional Japanese words existed. The speech was widely reported in western media via Time, which also derided Matsuda for having previously stated that he was the "Lloyd George of the Far East" Matsuda created further controversy in 1935, when he attempted to interfere in selection of works for display in the Niten Exhibition held by the Japan Art Academy.

Matsuda died in 1936. His grave is at the Tama Cemetery in Fuchū, Tokyo.

Political offices
| Preceded by Tanaka Giichi | Minister of Colonial Affairs; Oct 1929 - Apr 1931 | Succeeded by Shūjirō Hara |
| Preceded by Makoto Saitō | Minister of Education; Jul 1934- Feb 1936 | Succeeded by Takukichi Kawasaki |
