= Shūjirō Hara =

Japanese politician

- 原 脩次郎
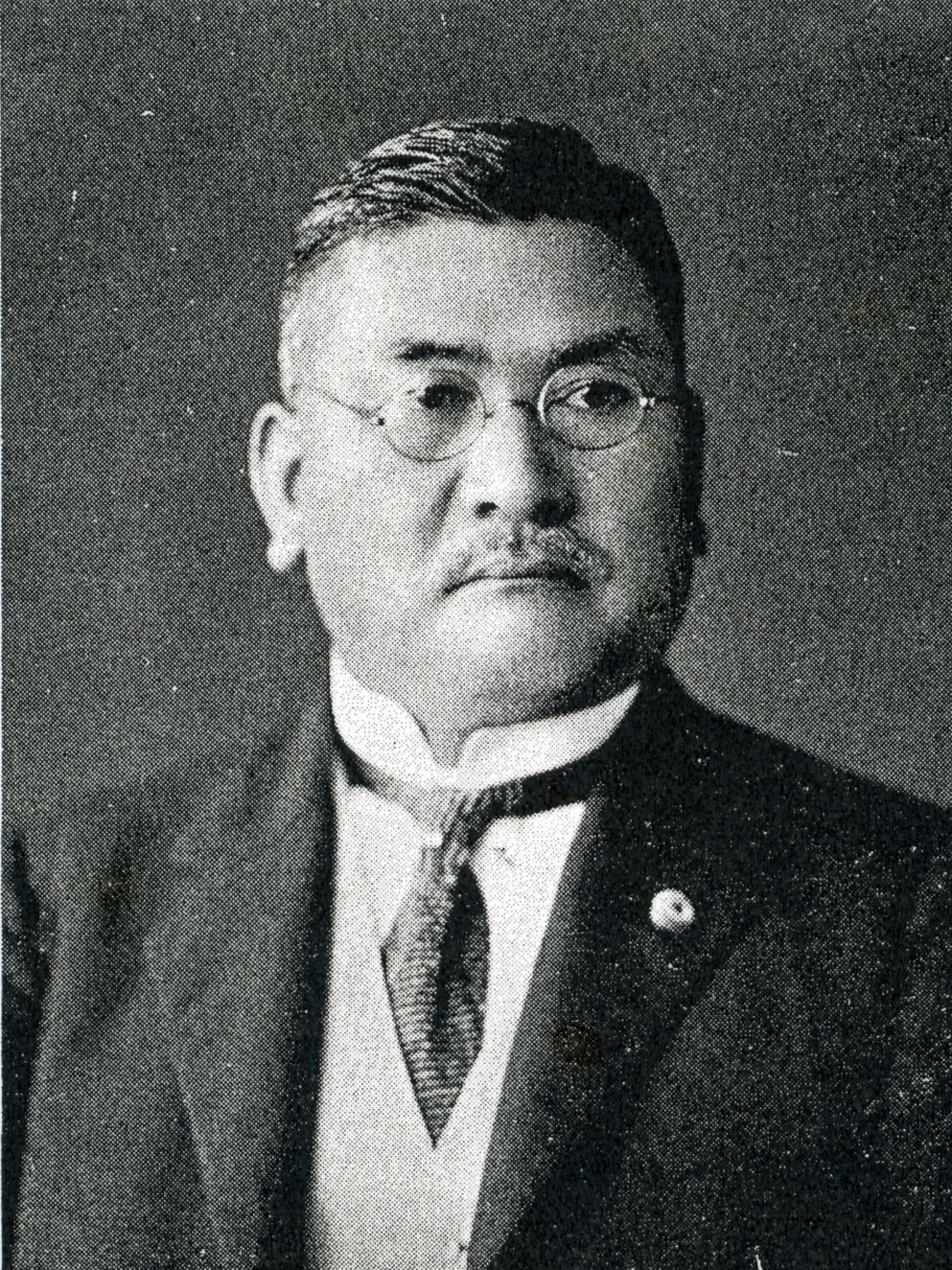
- Hara in 1929

Minister of Railways
- In office 10 September 1931 – 13 December 1931
- Prime Minister: Wakatsuki Reijirō
- Preceded by: Tasuku Egi
- Succeeded by: Tokonami Takejirō

Minister of Colonial Affairs
- In office 14 April 1931 – 10 September 1931
- Prime Minister: Wakatsuki Reijirō
- Preceded by: Genji Matsuda
- Succeeded by: Wakatsuki Reijirō

Member of the House of Representatives
- In office 10 May 1924 – 20 February 1932
- Preceded by: Teizō Ichimura
- Succeeded by: Horie Shōzaburō
- Constituency: Ibaraki 6th (1924–1928); Ibaraki 3rd (1928–1932)
- In office 15 May 1912 – 10 May 1920
- Preceded by: Multi-member district
- Succeeded by: Constituency abolished
- Constituency: Ibaraki Counties

Personal details
- Born: 4 October 1876 Ayabe, Kyoto, Japan
- Died: 6 March 1934 (aged 62) Tokyo, Japan
- Resting place: Tama Cemetery
- Party: Rikken Minseitō
- Other political affiliations: Rikken Kokumintō (1912–1913); Rikken Dōshikai (1913–1916); Kenseikai (1916–1927)
- Children: Takeshi Hara
- Relatives: Mitsuko Uchida (granddaughter)
- Education: Chuo University

Shūjirō Hara (原 脩次郎, Hara Shūjirō; July 1, 1871 – March 6, 1934), was a businessman, politician and cabinet minister in the Empire of Japan, serving as a member of the Lower House of the Diet of Japan six times, and twice as a cabinet minister.

== Biography ==
Hara was born in Ayabe City, Kyoto Prefecture, and was trained as a lawyer, graduating from the predecessor of Chuo University. In 1896, he moved to Hsinchu, Taiwan, where he worked as a judge for the new Japanese colonial government. In June 1901, he became head of the legal association of Tainan Prefecture, and in November 1901 was also made an assistant police commissioner under the Governor-General of Taiwan’s office in Tainan. Hara resigned in December 1904 to start his own sugar refining business. In December 1906, he was active in promoting the economic development of Taiwan’s east coast, becoming president of a joint venture company in August 1910 sponsoring immigration of Japanese settlers to Hualien County and a director of the company building Hualien Port, and the present of a company to supply electricity to the area.

Hara was first elected to the Lower House as a representative from his wife’s home prefecture of Ibaraki in the 1912 General Election. He was subsequently reelected five times.

On April 14, 1931, Hara was picked to be Minister of Colonial Affairs under the Second Wakatsuki Cabinet. On September 10, 1931, he traded that portfolio for that of Railway Minister, which he held to December 13, 1931. He subsequently served as a senior leader of the Rikken Minseitō political party.

Hara died at age 63, and his grave is at the Tama Cemetery in Fuchū, Tokyo. A bronze bust of Hara is located in the Kameshiro Park in Tsuchiura, Ibaraki.

He is the maternal grandfather of Mitsuko Uchida.

Political offices
Preceded by Genji Matsuda	Minister of Colonial Affairs; April 1931 – September 1931	Succeeded by Reijirō Wakatsuki
Preceded by Tasuku Egi	Minister of Railways; September 1931 – December 1931	Succeeded by Takejirō Tokonami
