= Wakatsuki Reijirō =

Prime Minister of Japan 1926–1927, 1931

Senior Second Rank Baron Wakatsuki Reijirō
- 若槻 礼次郎
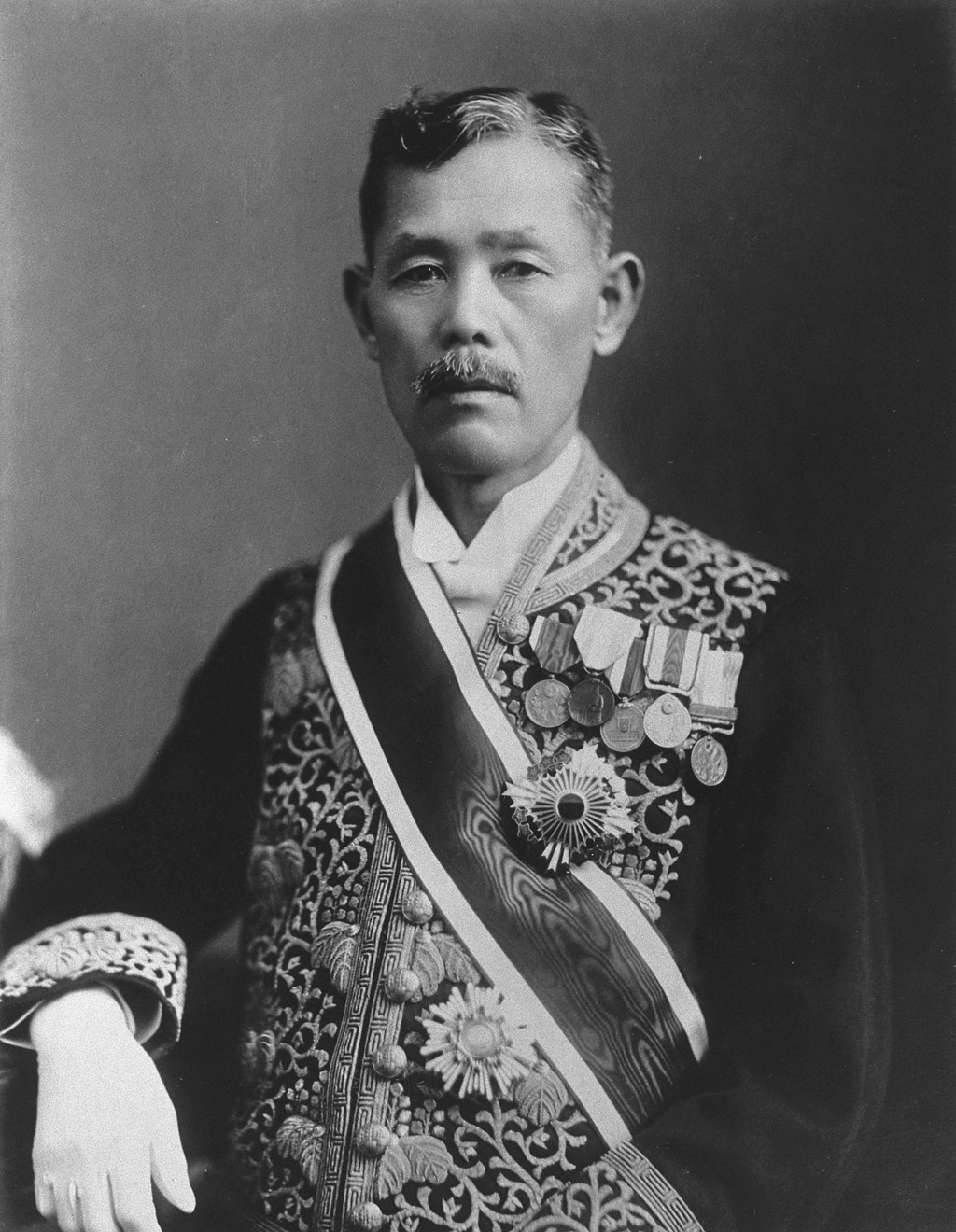

Prime Minister of Japan
- In office 14 April 1931 – 13 December 1931
- Monarch: Shōwa
- Preceded by: Hamaguchi Osachi
- Succeeded by: Inukai Tsuyoshi
- In office 30 January 1926 – 20 April 1927; Acting: 28 January 1926 – 30 January 1926
- Monarchs: Taishō; Shōwa
- Regent: Hirohito
- Preceded by: Katō Takaaki
- Succeeded by: Tanaka Giichi

President of the Rikken Minseitō
- In office 13 April 1931 – 1 November 1934
- Preceded by: Hamaguchi Osachi
- Succeeded by: Machida Chūji

President of the Kenseikai
- In office 29 January 1926 – 1 June 1927
- Preceded by: Katō Takaaki
- Succeeded by: Position abolished
Ministerial offices
Minister of Colonial Affairs
In office 10 September 1931 – 13 December 1931
Prime Minister	Himself
Preceded by	Shūjirō Hara
Succeeded by	Toyosuke Hata
Minister of Home Affairs
In office 11 June 1924 – 3 June 1926
Prime Minister	Katō Takaaki; Himself
Preceded by	Mizuno Rentarō
Succeeded by	Hamaguchi Osachi
Minister of Finance
In office 16 April 1914 – 10 August 1915
Prime Minister	Ōkuma Shigenobu
Preceded by	Takahashi Korekiyo
Succeeded by	Taketomi Tokitoshi
In office 21 December 1912 – 20 February 1913
Prime Minister	Katsura Tarō
Preceded by	Yamamoto Tatsuo
Succeeded by	Takahashi Korekiyo

Member of the House of Peers
- In office 24 August 1911 – 2 May 1947 Nominated by the Emperor

Personal details
- Born: 21 March 1866 Matsue, Izumo, Japan
- Died: 20 November 1949 (aged 83) Itō, Shizuoka, Japan
- Resting place: Somei Cemetery, Tokyo
- Party: Rikken Minseitō (1927–1940)
- Other political affiliations: Rikken Dōshikai (1913–1916); Kenseikai (1916–1927)
- Spouse: Wakatsuki Tokuko (m. 1892)
- Education: Tokyo Imperial University

Baron Wakatsuki Reijirō (若槻 禮次郎; 21 March 1866 – 20 November 1949) was a Japanese politician who twice served as Prime Minister of Japan from 1926 to 1927, and again in 1931.

== Early life and education ==
Wakatsuki Reijirō, né Okumura, was born on 21 March 1866, in Matsue, Izumo Province (present day Shimane Prefecture), the second son of ashigaru Okumura Sensaburō and his wife Kura. The family was of the samurai status, but was of the lowest class and very poor, so they worked side jobs to support themselves. When Reijirō was three years old, his mother died. As the father and the eldest brother were ordered to work in Yamazaki, Kyoto by the Matsue Domain, the responsibilities of the house fell onto Reijirō's 11-year-old elder sister Iwa who took care of the three-year-old Reijirō while having a side job. The Okumura family were low-ranking, and the family could not have a residence near the center of Sakaimachi. For this reason, the family lived in a rented house on the outskirts of the town, but by the time Reijirō was born, his father had just constructed a small house in Nishitanaka.

At the time, samurai were required to wear their katana (typically two), and Reijirō commuted to temple school wearing only one wooden sword on his hip. After graduating from elementary school, he entered a Chinese literary school, but quit the following year entering a middle school in Matsue. However, he was forced to quit middle school in just eight months because his family could not afford the tuition fees. After quitting school, he collected firewood in the mountains and helped with house chores.

At the age of 16, he began working as an elementary school substitute teacher. In 1883, he decided to enter the Imperial Japanese Army Academy as the tuition fees were government expensed, but failed the physical examination. The next year, he heard about student recruitment by the Law School of the Ministry of Justice, which also had its tuition fees covered by the government. However, the examination took place in Tokyo, and the travel fees were not covered. He consulted his uncle, Wakatsuki Kei, who was the head of Nogi District, and was able to borrow 30 yen from him. In 1884, Reijirō left Matsue at the age of 19.

Since Kei had no male heir, Reijirō was adopted by him, took the surname Wakatsuki, and married his daughter Tokuko. Wakatsuki Reijirō enrolled in the Tokyo Imperial University in 1892 and studied law.

== Political career ==
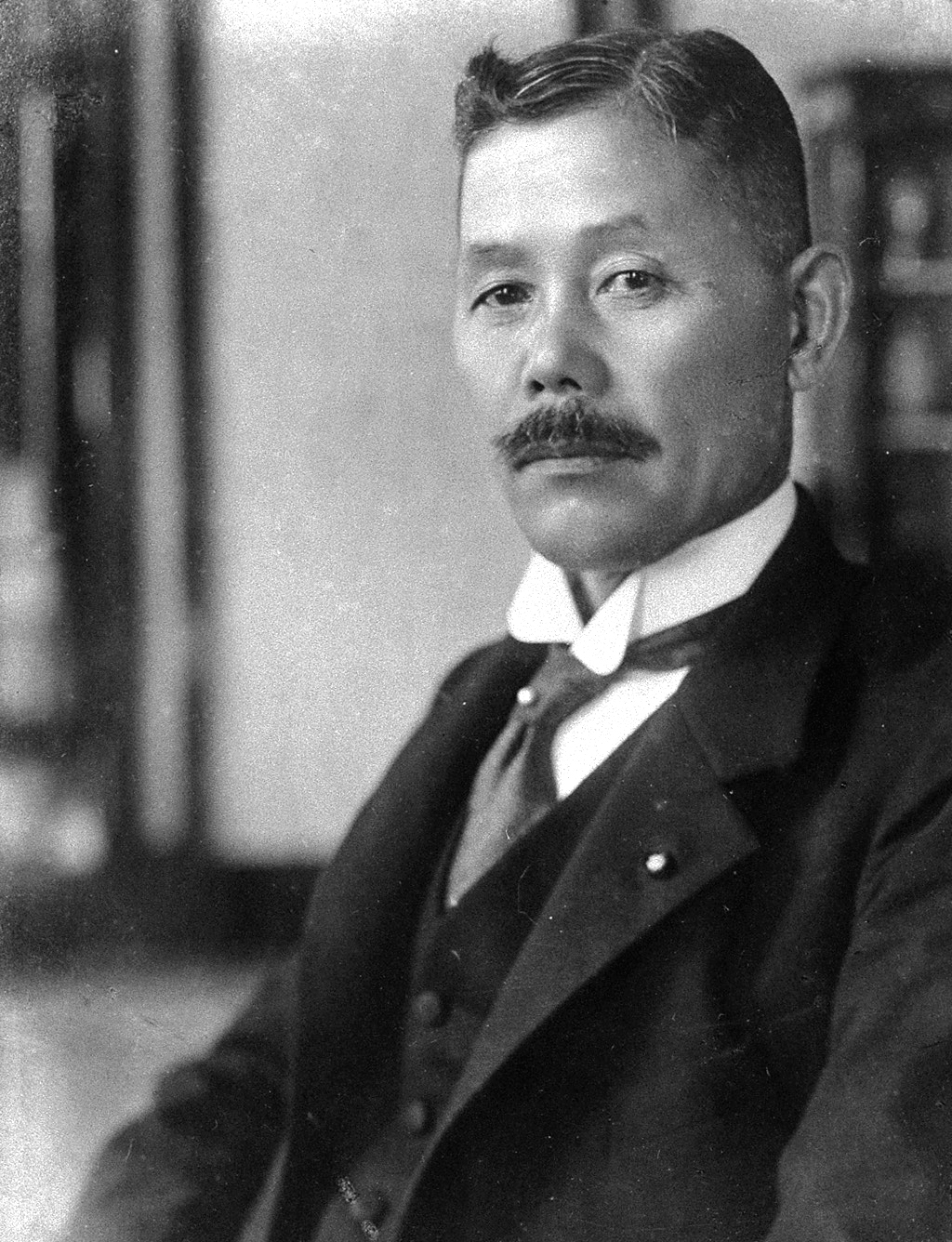
- Wakatsuki in 1926
- Premiership of Wakatsuki Reijirō
- Monarchs: Emperor Taishō; Emperor Shōwa
- Party: Kenseikai (1926–1927); Rikken Minseitō (1931)
- Seat: Naikaku Sōri Daijin Kantei
- First term 28 January 1926 – 20 April 1927
- Cabinet: First Wakatsuki Cabinet
- Second term 14 April 1931 – 13 December 1931
- Cabinet: Second Wakatsuki Cabinet
- Emblem of the Government of Japan

After graduation, Wakatsuki worked in the Ministry of Finance as tax bureau director and later as vice-minister. In 1911, he was appointed to the House of Peers. He then served as Minister of Finance under the 3rd Katsura administration and 2nd Ōkuma administration in the early 1910s and became a leading member of the Rikken Dōshikai political party, and its successor the Kenseikai, in 1914.

In June 1924, Wakatsuki was named Home Minister in the cabinet of Prime Minister Katō Takaaki, and worked to enact the Universal Manhood Suffrage Law and the Peace Preservation Law in 1925.

== First premiership (1926–1927) ==
On 30 January 1926, on Katō's unexpected death in office, Wakatsuki took over as Prime Minister of Japan. His first term lasted to 20 April 1927 when he was forced to resign during the Shōwa financial crisis.

== Out of office (1927–1931) ==
Wakatsuki remained physically active in his senior years, enjoying jiu-jitsu, archery, fishing, and sailing. During a sailing excursion as prime minister, with two bodyguards and his secretary, Wakatsuki's sampan struck a log and overturned. The bodyguards could not swim so the 60-year-old Wakatsuki and his secretary kept the group afloat until another boat arrived to assist them.

Wakatsuki was awarded the Order of the Paulownia Flowers on 10 November 1928. After serving as chief delegate plenipotentiary to the London Naval Conference 1930, Wakatsuki pushed strongly for speedy ratification of the disarmament treaty, thus earning the wrath of the Japanese military and various ultranationalist groups.

== Second premiership (1931) ==
After Prime Minister Hamaguchi was forced out of office by the severe injuries incurred in an assassination attempt, Wakatsuki assumed the leadership of the Rikken Minseitō, the successor to the Kenseikai. He was elevated to the rank of baron (danshaku) in the kazoku peerage system in April 1931. Wakatsuki once again became Prime Minister from 14 April 1931 to 13 December 1931. During Wakatsuki's second term, he failed to control the Imperial Japanese Army. He was unable either to prevent the Manchurian Incident from occurring, or to rein in the Army from further escalation in China afterwards despite orders to cease hostilities. This frustration culminated in his resignation, which finally allowed for the unleashing of the full force of the Kwantung Army's northern operation.

== Later life ==
After his retirement as Prime Minister, Wakatsuki became president of the Rikken Minseitō in July 1934. Despite the growing militarism in Japanese society, he continued to oppose the Second Sino-Japanese War, and was adamantly opposed to extending the war to include the United States and other western powers. Even after the declaration of hostilities in World War II, he publicly stated the war should end as quickly as possible. In May 1945, on hearing of the collapse of Nazi Germany, he emerged from retirement to urge Prime Minister Kantarō Suzuki to open negotiations with the United States as soon as possible. In August, he participated in the government panel recommending unconditional acceptance of the Potsdam Declaration.

After the surrender of Japan, Wakatsuki was subpoenaed by the Supreme Commander of the Allied Powers in June 1946 as a prosecution witness at The International Military Tribunal for the Far East. Wakatsuki died of Angina pectoris at his summer home in Itō, Shizuoka on 20 November 1949. His grave is at the Somei Cemetery in downtown Tokyo.

== Honours ==
From the corresponding article in the Japanese Wikipedia

- Grand Cordon of the Order of the Sacred Treasure (24 August 1911; Fifth Class: 28 December 1902)
- Grand Cordon of the Order of the Rising Sun (14 July 1916; Second Class: 1 April 1906)
- Grand Cordon of the Order of the Rising Sun with Paulownia Flowers (10 November 1928)
- Baron (11 April 1931)

== See also ==
- History of Japan

== Notes ==
Political offices
Preceded by Katō Takaaki	Prime Minister of Japan; 30 January 1926 – 20 April 1927	Succeeded by Tanaka Giichi
Preceded by Hamaguchi Osachi	Prime Minister of Japan (acting); 28 January 1931 – 30 January 1931	Succeeded by Inukai Tsuyoshi
Preceded by Mizuno Rentarō	Home Minister; 11 June 1924 – 3 January 1926	Succeeded by Hamaguchi Osachi
Preceded by Yamamoto Tatsuo	Minister of Finance; 21 December 1912 – 20 February 1913	Succeeded by Takahashi Korekiyo
Preceded by Takahashi Korekiyo	Minister of Finance; 16 April 1914 – 10 August 1915	Succeeded by Taketomi Tomitoshi
Preceded by Shūjirō Hara	Minister of Colonial Affairs (acting); 10 September 1931 – 13 December 1931	Succeeded by Toyosuke Hata
