= Tokonami Takejirō =

Japanese politician (1866-1935)

- 床次 竹二郎
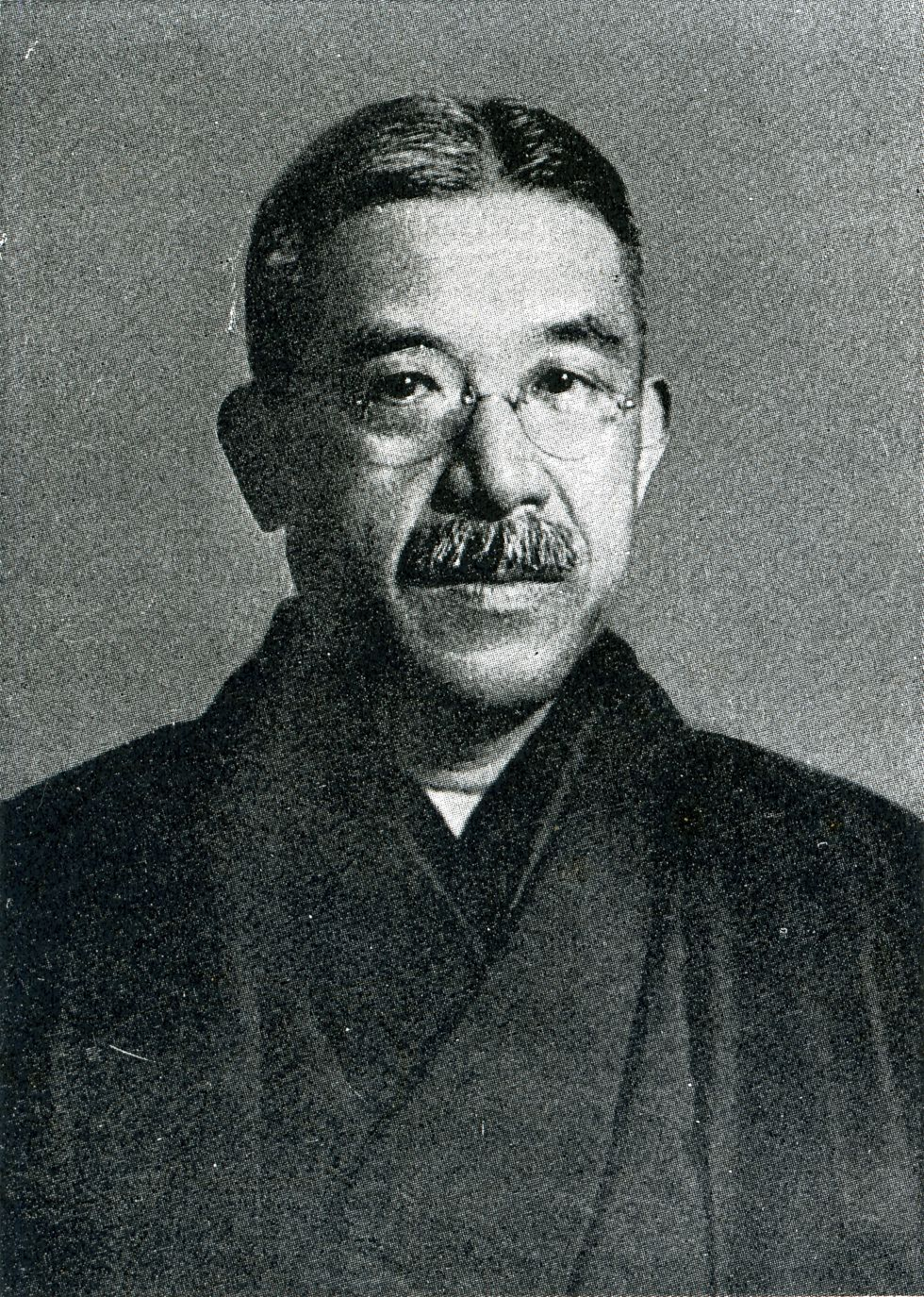
- Tokonami Takejirō

Minister of Communications
- In office 8 June 1934 – 8 September 1935
- Prime Minister: Keisuke Okada
- Preceded by: Minami Hiroshi
- Succeeded by: Okada Keisuke

Minister of Railways
- In office 13 December 1931 – 26 May 1932
- Prime Minister: Tsuyoshi Inukai
- Preceded by: Shūjirō Hara
- Succeeded by: Chūzō Mitsuchi

President of the Seiyūhontō
- In office 29 January 1924 – 1 June 1927
- Preceded by: Position established
- Succeeded by: Position abolished

Minister of Home Affairs
- In office 29 September 1918 – 21 June 1922
- Prime Minister: Hara Takashi; Takahashi Korekiyo
- Preceded by: Mizuno Rentarō
- Succeeded by: Mizuno Rentarō

Member of the House of Representatives; from Kagoshima
- In office 22 April 1914 – 8 September 1935
- Preceded by: Sumitaka Haseba
- Succeeded by: Seigo Imakiire
- Constituency: Counties district (1914–1917); Kagoshima City (1917–1920); 1st district (1920–1928); 1st district (1928–1935)

Director of the Karafuto Agency
- In office 24 April 1908 – 12 June 1908
- Monarch: Meiji
- Preceded by: Kusunose Yukihiko
- Succeeded by: Sadatarō Hiraoka

Governor of Akita Prefecture
- In office 31 December 1905 – 17 January 1906
- Monarch: Meiji
- Preceded by: Oka Kishichirō
- Succeeded by: Seino Chōtarō

Governor of Tokushima Prefecture
- In office 25 January 1904 – 31 December 1905
- Monarch: Meiji
- Preceded by: Eizaburō Kamei
- Succeeded by: Iwao Saburō

Personal details
- Born: 6 January 1866 Kagoshima, Satsuma, Japan
- Died: 9 August 1935 (aged 69) Yodobashi, Tokyo, Japan
- Resting place: Tama Cemetery
- Party: Rikken Seiyūkai (1913–1924; 1929–1934)
- Other political affiliations: See list: Shinsei Club (1924); Seiyūhontō (1924–1927); Shintō Club (1927); Rikken Minseitō (1927–1928); Shintō Club (1928–1929); Daiichi Hikaeshitsu (1934–1935); Mushozoku Shitsu (1935)
- A: Single-member district B: Multi-member district

Takejirō Tokonami (床次 竹二郎, Tokonami Takejirō; 6 January 1866 – 8 September 1935) was a Japanese statesman, politician and cabinet minister in Taishō and early Shōwa period Japan. Tokonami was involved in several government agencies throughout his career, and served in the leadership of different political parties. He was regarded by his contemporaries as a rather opportunistic politician eager for an opportunity to become prime minister.

== Early life ==
Tokonami was born January 1866 in Kagoshima, where his father was a samurai in the service of the Shimazu clan of Satsuma Domain. After the Meiji Restoration, his father moved to Tokyo and served as a judge within the Ministry of Justice, and also was a self-taught oil painter, noted for a portrait painting of Itō Hirobumi, among other works. Takejirō, his eldest son, graduated from the law school at the Tokyo Imperial University. One of his classmates was future president of the Privy Council Hara Yoshimichi.

== Bureaucratic career ==
On graduation, Tokonami entered the Ministry of Finance, and later the Home Ministry. He served as Vice-Governor of Miyagi Prefecture, Chief of Police of Okayama Prefecture, and Chief Secretary of Tokyo Prefecture before being assigned the post of Governor of Tokushima Prefecture from 1904 to 1905, followed by Akita Prefecture from 1905 to 1906.

Appointed vice-minister of the Home Ministry in 1906, he assisted Home Minister Hara Takashi in his efforts to abolish the rural district as an administrative unit over the opposition of the House of Peers. Tokonami was appointed Director of the Karafuto Agency, governing the Karafuto Prefecture from 24 April 1908 to 12 June 1908.

Returning to the Home Ministry, he rose to the post of Vice-Minister for Local Affairs in 1912. While vice-minister, Tokonami arranged a conference between Japanese Shintoist, Buddhist and Christian leaders in February 1912 to coordinate efforts towards social work projects and to counter political radicalism. He also worked towards government intervention in sponsoring negotiations towards rapid resolution of labor disputes through a combination of threats and negotiations supporting labor union activity on one hand, while simultaneously using police powers to control or limit strikes. Tokonami subsequently served as President of the Japanese Government Railways in 1913.

== Political career ==
Tokonami officially joined the Rikken Seiyūkai political party in 1913, although he had been active in party affairs prior to this time. He was elected to the House of Representatives of Japan from the Kagoshima No.1 electoral district in the Japanese General Election, 1915, and subsequently held the same seat through eight elections until his death in 1935.

Tokonami became Home Minister in the Hara administration from 1918, while concurrently retaining the post of Railway Minister He supported the Kyōchōkai, which took a Neo-Confucianist and reformist-conservative view towards social reform. His response to the Rice Riots of 1918 was to issue directives to all prefectural governors to encourage thrift and frugality among the general public, blaming the riots on the public's infatuation with luxury.

During this time, he also presided over electoral district reforms. After Hara's assassination in 1921, Tokonami continued in the same post under the Takahashi administration. However, in 1924, when Kiyoura Keigo became Prime Minister, Takahashi and many other Seiyūkai members rebelled against his non-party cabinet. Tokonami and Yamamoto Tatsuo organized the Seiyu Hontō party supporting Kiyoura. Tokonami continued to serve in a leadership role when the Seiyu Hontō and Kenseikai merged to form the Rikken Minseitō in 1927. However, in August 1928, he formed the Shintō Kurabu, with some 30 former Minseitō members, which cooperated with the Seiyūkai on a variety of issues, including the strengthening of the Peace Preservation Laws. He also cooperated with the Seiyūkai on a gerrymandering scheme to replace the existing large electoral districts with single-seat districts in rural areas (a Seiyūkai stronghold) and smaller two-three seat urban districts. The plan was derided by the Minseitō as "Tokomandering".

Tokonami was accused of taking a bribe of 500,000 yuan from Warlord of Manchuria Zhang Xueliang in 1928.

Tokonami re-joined the Rikken Seiyūkai party in July 1929. He was selected to become Railway Minister under the Inukai administration in December 1931. After Inukai's assassination in the May 15 Incident, he unsuccessfully campaigned for head of the party, but was persuaded by party elders to drop out and allow Suzuki Kisaburō to remain party head. Tokonami returned to the cabinet as Communications Minister in the Okada administration in July 1934, over considerable internal opposition within the party, as Tokonami belonged to a group of politicians that had previously opposed him. Tokonami suffered from a heart attack while in office, and died on 8 September 1935 at his home in Tokyo. His grave is at the Tama Cemetery in Fuchū, Tokyo. He was posthumously awarded the Order of the Paulownia Flowers.

== Bibliography ==
- Impressions of Europe and America.

Political offices
| Preceded by Minami Hiroshi | Minister of Communications; 8 June 1934 – 8 September 1935 | Succeeded by Okada Keisuke |
| Preceded by Hara Osamu | Railway Minister; 13 December 1931 – 26 May 1932 | Succeeded by Chūzō Mitsuchi |
| Preceded by Mizuno Rentarō | Home Minister; 13 December 1931 – 26 May 1932 | Succeeded by Mizuno Rentarō |
| Preceded by Kusunose Yukihiko | Director of the Karafuto Agency; 24 April 1908 – 23 June 1908 | Succeeded by Hiraoka Teitarou |
| Preceded by Okada Kishichōrō | Governor of Tokushima Prefecture; 31 Dec 1905 – 17 Jan 1906 | Succeeded by Seino Chōtarō |
| Preceded by Kamei Eizaburō | Governor of Tokushima Prefecture; 25 Jan 1904 – 31 Dec 1905 | Succeeded by Iwao Saburō |
