= Tanaka Giichi =

Japanese general, prime minister from 1927 to 1929

Baron Tanaka Giichi
- 田中 義一
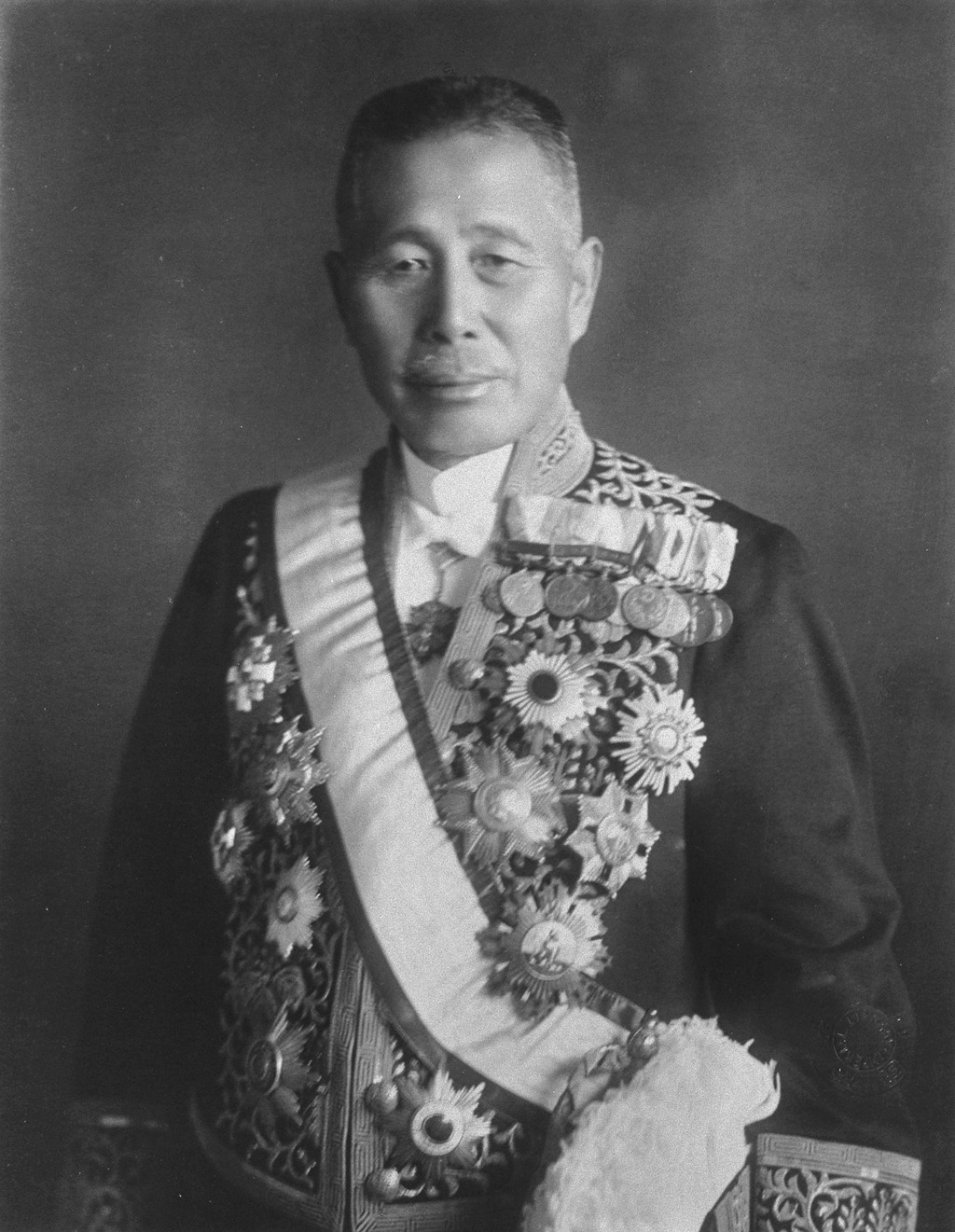

Prime Minister of Japan
- In office 20 April 1927 – 2 July 1929
- Monarch: Shōwa
- Preceded by: Wakatsuki Reijirō
- Succeeded by: Hamaguchi Osachi

President of the Rikken Seiyūkai
- In office 10 April 1925 – 29 September 1929
- Preceded by: Takahashi Korekiyo
- Succeeded by: Inukai Tsuyoshi
Ministerial offices
Minister of Colonial Affairs
In office 10 June 1929 – 2 July 1929
Prime Minister	Himself
Preceded by	Office established
Succeeded by	Genji Matsuda
Minister for Foreign Affairs
In office 20 April 1927 – 2 July 1929
Prime Minister	Himself
Preceded by	Kijūrō Shidehara
Succeeded by	Kijūrō Shidehara
Minister of Home Affairs
In office 4 May 1928 – 23 May 1928
Prime Minister	Himself
Preceded by	Suzuki Kisaburō
Succeeded by	Mochizuki Keisuke
Minister of the Army
In office 2 September 1923 – 7 January 1924
Prime Minister	Yamamoto Gonnohyōe
Preceded by	Yamanashi Hanzō
Succeeded by	Ugaki Kazushige
In office 20 September 1918 – 9 June 1921
Prime Minister	Hara Takashi
Preceded by	Ōshima Ken'ichi
Succeeded by	Yamanashi Hanzō

Member of the House of Peers
- In office 29 January 1926 – 29 September 1929 Nominated by the Emperor

Personal details
- Born: 22 June 1864 Hagi, Nagato, Japan
- Died: 29 September 1929 (aged 65) Kōjimachi, Tokyo, Japan
- Resting place: Tama Cemetery
- Party: Rikken Seiyūkai
- Spouse: Tanaka Sute (m. 1893)
- Children: Tanaka Tatsuo
- Education: Imperial Japanese Army Academy; Army War College
- Military career
- Allegiance: Empire of Japan
- Branch: Imperial Japanese Army
- Service years: 1874–1924
- Rank: General

Baron Tanaka Giichi (Japanese: 田中 義一; IPA: [ta̠na̠ka̠ ɡʲiːt͡ɕi]; 22 June 1864 – 29 September 1929) was a Japanese general and politician who served as Prime Minister of Japan from 1927 to 1929.

Born to a samurai family in the Chōshū Domain, Tanaka became an officer in the Imperial Japanese Army and rose through the ranks. He served as Minister of the Army under Prime Ministers Hara Takashi and Yamamoto Gonnohyōe. After retiring from active duty he accepted the presidency of the Rikken Seiyūkai, a major conservative party. Following the resignation of the Wakatsuki Cabinet in 1927, Tanaka was appointed Prime Minister. In foreign affairs, he pursued a hawkish policy; in domestic affairs, he sought to suppress communist and socialist movements. Criticised for his handling of the unauthorised assassination of Zhang Zuolin by a Kwangtung Army officer, he resigned in 1929 and died soon afterwards.

== Early life and military career ==
Tanaka was born as the third son of a low-ranking samurai family in the service of Chōshū Domain in Hagi, Nagato Province (modern day Yamaguchi Prefecture), Japan. At the age of 13, he participated in the Hagi Rebellion. He had an interest in politics from an early age, serving on a village council and as an elementary school teacher. He only joined the Imperial Japanese Army at the age of 20.

He graduated from the former 8th class of Imperial Japanese Army Academy and the 8th class of the Army War College in 1892, and served as a junior officer during the First Sino-Japanese War. After the end of the war, he was sent as a military attaché to Moscow and Petrograd, and was in Russia at the same time as Takeo Hirose of the Imperial Japanese Navy, with whom he became close friends. Tanaka was fluent in the Russian language, which he learned while attending mass every Sunday at a Russian Orthodox church, which enabled him to practice his Russian at church social events, although it is uncertain if he ever actually converted to Christianity. As one of the few Russian experts within the military, he was an invaluable resource to Army planners during the Russo-Japanese War, and served as aide to General Kodama Gentarō in Manchuria.

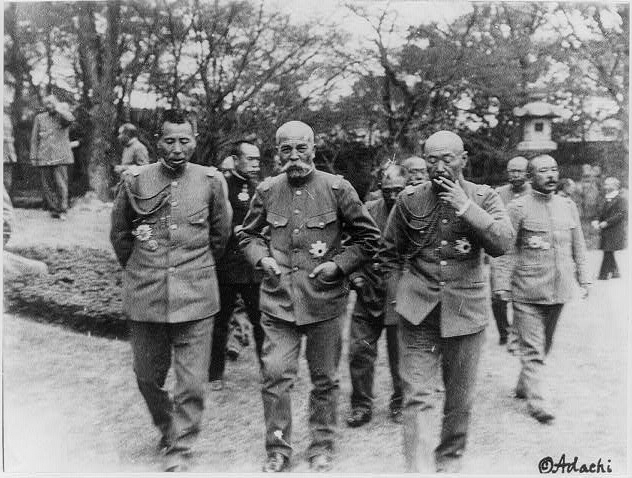
Tanaka (left) walking with Generals Ōshima Ken'ichi (center) and Uehara (right), 1918

In 1906, Tanaka helped draft a defense plan which was so highly regarded by the Imperial Japanese Army General Staff and General Yamagata Aritomo that it was adopted as basic policy until World War I. He was also awarded the Order of the Golden Kite (3rd class) in April 1906.

In 1910, he established a Veterans Association. Tanaka was promoted to major general in 1911, and was made director of the Military Affairs Bureau at the Ministry of the Army, where he recommended an increase in the strength of the standing army by two additional infantry divisions. He was awarded the Order of the Sacred Treasure (1st class) in September 1918. He joined the cabinet of Prime Ministers Hara Takashi as Army Minister from September 1918 to June 1921. He was promoted to full general in 1920 and was awarded the Order of the Rising Sun (1st class). He was also elevated to the title of danshaku (baron) under the kazoku peerage system. However, the Hara cabinet came under unceasing criticism due to the Nishihara Loans, the disastrous Nikolayevsk incident and accusations of Army misappropriation of secret funds, and supporting unsavory figures such as White Movement general Roman von Ungern-Sternberg. After suffering from an attack of angina, Tanaka resigned all posts, and retired to his summer home in Oiso, Kanagawa.

== Political career ==
Tanaka returned as Army Minister in the 2nd Yamamoto administration from September 1923 to January 1924. After retiring from the army, Tanaka was invited to accept the post of party president of the Rikken Seiyūkai political party in 1925 and was made a member of the House of Peers in January 1926. He had been scheduled to be promoted to the rank of Field Marshal at the time of his retirement. However, Tanaka's expected promotion to field marshal was blocked after controversy arose over 3 million yen in political funds that he brought with him upon assuming the presidency of the Rikken Seiyūkai. Critics alleged that the money originated from Army secret funds, but the prosecution was dropped four years later due to insufficient evidence.

=== Premiership (1927–1929) ===
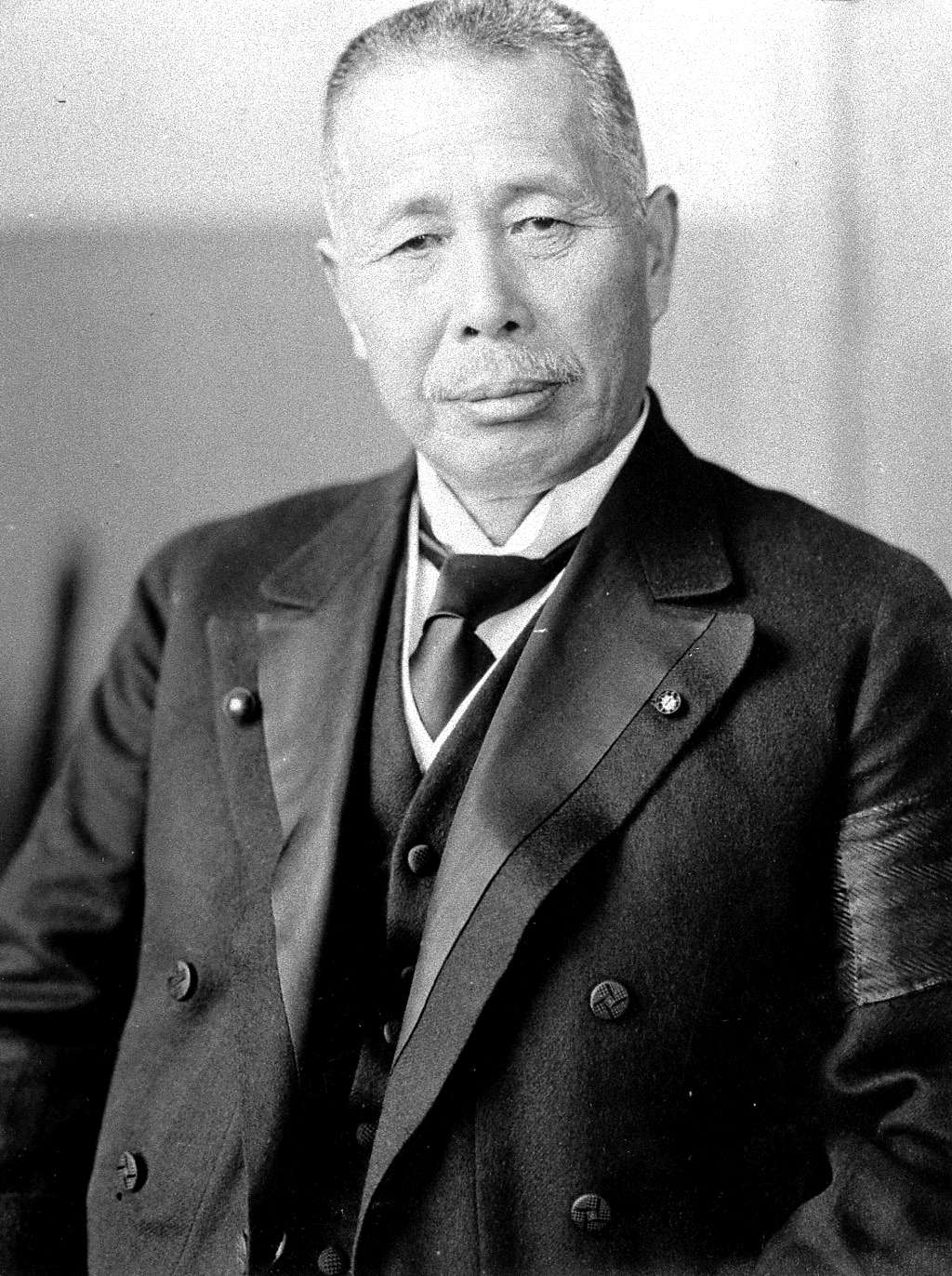
- Tanaka, before 1929
- Premiership of Tanaka Giichi; 20 April 1927 – 2 July 1929
- Monarch: Emperor Shōwa
- Cabinet: Tanaka Giichi Cabinet
- Party: Rikken Seiyūkai
- Election: 1928
- Seat: Naikaku Sōri Daijin Kantei
- Emblem of the Government of Japan

Tanaka became Prime Minister of Japan on 20 April 1927, during the Shōwa financial crisis, serving simultaneously as the Foreign Affairs Minister. He later added the posts of Home Minister (4 May 1928 to 23 May 1928), and Colonial Affairs Minister (10 June 1929 to 2 July 1929) to his portfolio.

On the domestic front, Tanaka attempted to suppress communists and socialists and their sympathizers through widespread arrests (the 15 March incident of 1928, and the 19 April incident of 1929).

On foreign policy, Tanaka differed from his predecessor Shidehara both tactically and strategically. Whereas Shidehara preferred to evacuate Japanese residents where conflicts occurred with local people, Tanaka preferred using military force. While Shidehara theoretically respected China's sovereignty, Tanaka openly pursued a "separation of Manchuria and Inner Mongolia policy" (満蒙分離政策, Man-Mō bunri seisaku) to create a sense of difference between those areas and the rest of China. On three separate occasions in 1927 and 1928 he sent troops to intervene militarily in Shandong Province to block Chiang Kai-shek's Northern Expedition to unify China under Kuomintang rule, in what became known as the Jinan Incident.

Tanaka came into office even as forces were already beginning to converge that would draw Japan into World War II. In 1928, however, the machinations of the ultranationalist secret societies and the Kwantung Army resulted in a crisis: the assassination of the Manchurian warlord Zhang Zuolin and the failed attempt to seize Manchuria. Tanaka himself was taken by surprise by the assassination plot and argued that the officers responsible should be publicly court-martialed for homicide. The military establishment, from which Tanaka was by now estranged, insisted on covering up the facts of the incident, which remained an official secret. Bereft of support, and under mounting criticism in the Diet and even from emperor Hirohito himself, Tanaka and his cabinet resigned en masse on 2 July 1929.

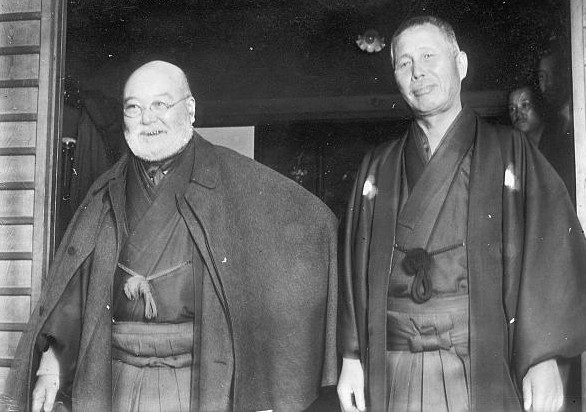
Prime Ministers Korekiyo Takahashi (1854–1936, in office 1921–22, left) and Giichi Tanaka (1864–1929, in office 1927–29)

=== Death ===
Tanaka was succeeded by Hamaguchi Osachi, and died a few months after his resignation. He was awarded the Order of the Paulownia Flowers on his death. His grave is at the Tama Cemetery in Fuchū, Tokyo.

== Tanaka Memorial ==
In 1929, China accused Tanaka of having authored the "Tanaka Memorial Imperialist Conquest Plan," which advocated the conquest of Manchuria, Mongolia, and eventually the whole of China. He was alleged to have presented the plan to the emperor in 1927. The plan was presented as fact in the wartime propaganda film series Why We Fight, which claimed that the plan envisaged the conquest of America after East Asia. In a memoir published in the mid-1950s, a Japanese-born Taiwanese businessman, Tsai Chih-Kan, claimed that he had personally copied the "Plan" from the Imperial Library on the night of 20 June 1928 in a covert action assisted by several of Japan's leading prewar politicians and officers, who were opposed to Tanaka. Today, most historians regard the document as a forgery.

== Awards and decorations ==
From the corresponding article in the Japanese Wikipedia

=== Japanese ===
==== Peerages and titles ====
- Baron (7 September 1920)

==== Court ranks ====
- Senior second rank (29 September 1929; posthumous)

==== Decorations ====
Year awarded	Ribbon	Decoration	Notes
29 November 1889		Imperial Constitution Promulgation Medal	
12 October 1895		Order of the Sacred Treasure, 6th class	
12 October 1895		Order of the Golden Kite, 5th class	
18 November 1895		First Sino-Japanese War Medal	
30 November 1901		Order of the Sacred Treasure, 5th class	
30 May 1905		Order of the Sacred Treasure, 4th class	
1 April 1906		Order of the Golden Kite, 3rd class	
1 August 1912		Korean Annexation Commemorative Medal	
1 November 1915		Order of the Sacred Treasure, 2nd Class	
7 November 1915		First World War Medal (1914–1915)	
10 November 1915		Emperor Taishō Enthronement Commemorative Medal	
29 September 1918		Order of the Sacred Treasure, 1st Class	
7 September 1920		Grand Cordon of the Order of the Rising Sun	
7 September 1920		First World War Medal (1914–1920)	
7 September 1920		World War I Victory Medal	
1 July 1921		First National Census Commemorative Medal	
29 September 1929		Grand Cordon of the Order of the Rising Sun with Paulownia Flowers	(posthumous)
29 September 1929		Imperial Capital Rehabilitation Commemorative Medal	(posthumous)

=== Foreign ===
Year awarded	Country	Ribbon	Decoration	Notes
8 December 1903	Russian Empire		Order of Saint Anna, 2nd class	
21 May 1909	Russian Empire		Order of Saint Stanislaus, 2nd class	
25 November 1909	Qing dynasty		Order of the Double Dragon, Class II Grade II	
11 March 1913	Russian Empire		Order of Saint Stanislaus, 1st class	
18 September 1914	Kingdom of Bulgaria		Order of Saint Alexander, 2nd class	
19 January 1916	Russian Empire		Order of Saint Anna, 1st class	
28 March 1918	Republic of China		Order of the Striped Tiger, 2nd class	
3 July 1918	United Kingdom		Honorary Knight Commander of the Order of St. Michael and St. George	
19 December 1918	Republic of China		Order of the Striped Tiger, 1st class	
15 April 1920	France		Grand Cross of the Legion d'Honneur	
29 April 1920	Kingdom of Greece		Order of George I, 1st class	
28 July 1920	Kingdom of Romania		Grand Cross of the Star of Romania, with Swords	
16 November 1921	Spain		Cross of Military Merit, with White Decoration	
10 May 1922	United States		Distinguished Service Medal	
29 August 1922	Czechoslovakia		War Cross 1918, 3rd award	
5 October 1927	Poland		Order of Polonia Restituta, Grand Cordon	
29 July 1929	Denmark		Grand Cross of the Order of the Dannebrog	
28 September 1929	United Kingdom		Honorary Knight Grand Cross of the Order of St. Michael and St. George	

== Sources ==
- Dower, John W. (1987). War Without Mercy: Race and Power in the Pacific War. Pantheon. ISBN 0-394-75172-8.
- Gluck, Carol. Japan's Modern Myths. Princeton University Press (1987). ISBN 0-691-00812-4
- Hane, Mikiso. Modern Japan: A Historical Survey. Westview Press (2001). ISBN 0-8133-3756-9
- Harries, Meirion. Soldiers of the Sun: The Rise and Fall of the Imperial Japanese Army. Random House; Reprint edition (1994). ISBN 0-679-75303-6
- Morton, William Finch. Tanaka Giichi and Japan's China Policy. New York: St. Martin's Press, 1980.
- Fukagawa, Hideki (1981). (陸海軍将官人事総覧 (陸軍篇)) Army and Navy General Personnel Directory (Army). Tokyo: Fuyo Shobo. ISBN 4829500026.
- Dupuy, Trevor N. (1992). Encyclopedia of Military Biography. I B Tauris & Co Ltd. ISBN 1-85043-569-3.
- Hata, Ikuhiko (2005). (日本陸海軍総合事典) Japanese Army and Navy General Encyclopedia. Tokyo: St. Martin's Press. ISBN 4130301357.
