= Toyosuke Hata =

Japanese politician

Senior Third Rank Toyosuke Hata
- 秦 豊助
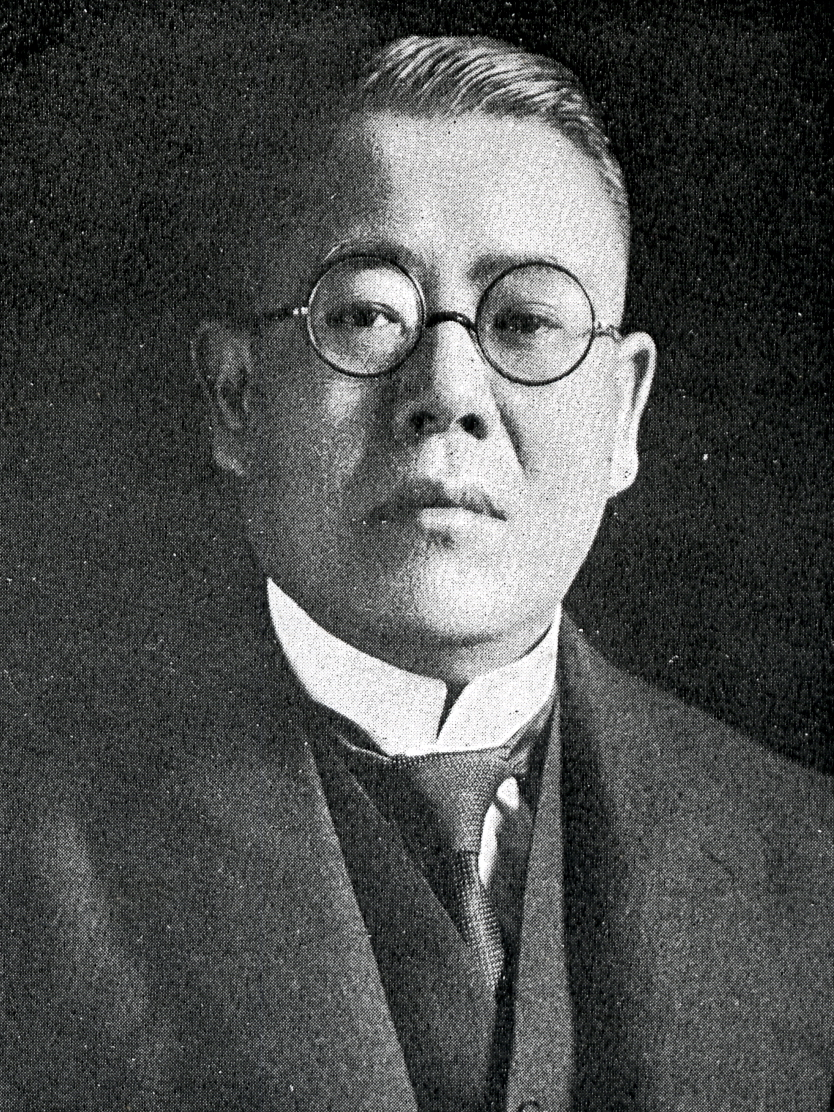

Minister of Colonial Affairs
- In office 13 December 1931 – 26 May 1932
- Prime Minister: Inukai Tsuyoshi
- Preceded by: Wakatsuki Reijirō
- Succeeded by: Ryūtarō Nagai

Member of the House of Representatives; from Saitama
- In office 25 March 1915 – 4 February 1933
- Preceded by: Multi-member district
- Succeeded by: Yasutaro Suzuki
- Constituency: Prefecture district (1915–1920); 1st district (1920–1928); 1st district (1928–1928)

Governor of Tokushima Prefecture
- In office 28 April 1914 – 8 January 1915
- Monarch: Taishō
- Preceded by: Katsusaburō Watanabe
- Succeeded by: Riheita Kameyama

Governor of Akita Prefecture
- In office 28 March 1912 – 28 April 1914
- Monarchs: Meiji; Taishō
- Preceded by: Mori Masataka
- Succeeded by: Saburo Sakamoto

Personal details
- Born: 29 September 1872 Tsukiji, Tokyo, Japan
- Died: 4 February 1933 (aged 60) Tsukiji, Tokyo, Japan
- Party: Rikken Seiyūkai
- Education: Tokyo Imperial University
- A: Single-member district B: Multi-member district

Toyosuke Hata (秦 豊助, Hata Toyosuke; 29 September 1872 – 4 February 1933), was a politician and cabinet minister in the Empire of Japan, serving as governor of Akita Prefecture and of Tokushima Prefecture, and as a member of the Lower House of the Diet of Japan seven times, and once as a cabinet minister.

== Biography ==
Hata was born in Tsukiji, Tokyo, where his father, a shipping magnate, was Vice-Speaker of the Tokyo Metropolitan Assembly. Hata graduated from the law school of Tokyo Imperial University, and found a position as a bureaucrat within the Home Ministry in 1896.

In May 1897, Hata was appointed a legal councilor to Fukui Prefecture. This was followed by assignments in Ehime, Chiba and Kanagawa Prefectures. In April 1905, he was sent to Europe for studies, returning in May 1906. In July 1906 he was sent to Nagasaki Prefecture has the head representative of the Home Ministry.

In March 1912, Hata assumed the post of governor of Akita Prefecture, which he held to 1914. He was then assigned the post of governor of Tokushima Prefecture from 1914 to 1915. Hata made his debut in national politics during the 1915 General Election and was elected to the Lower House as a representative from Saitama. He was subsequently reelected six times. He served in a number of vice ministerial posts, and became Secretary-General of the Rikken Seiyūkai political party in July 1927.

In December 1931, Hata was picked to be Minister of Colonial Affairs under the Inukai administration, which he held until the collapse of that administration following the May 15 Incident in May 1932. Hata died the following year at age 61.

Political offices
Preceded by Reijirō Wakatsuki	Minister of Colonial Affairs; December 1931 – May 1932	Succeeded by Ryūtarō Nagai
