= Ministry of Colonial Affairs (Japan) =

Government ministry of Japan from 1929 to 1942

- 拓務省; Takumushō

Agency overview
- Formed: June 10, 1929
- Dissolved: November 1, 1942
- Superseding agency: Colonization Bureau
- Parent agency: Empire of Japan

The Ministry of Colonial Affairs (拓務省, Takumushō) was a cabinet-level government ministry of the Empire of Japan from 1929 to 1942.

== History ==
The original Ministry of Colonial Affairs was the short-lived Hokkaidō Colonization Office, established in the early Meiji period by Prime Minister Kuroda Kiyotaka to protect Japan's sparely populated northern frontier against encroachment by the Russian Empire by encouraging the settlement of ex-soldiers as militia-farmers in Hokkaidō.

This was followed by the even shorter-lived Colonial Administration Department within the office of the Governor-General of Taiwan. Established on 2 April 1896 by General Takashima Tomonosuke, it was intended to encourage Japanese investment and settlement in Taiwan, after the acquisition of that island by Japan as a result of the First Sino-Japanese War. The office was abolished on 2 September 1897.

Japan acquired Korea, Karafuto (South Sakhalin), and the Kwantung Leased Territory as a result of the Russo-Japanese War, and a Colonization Bureau (拓務局, Takumukyoku) was established within the Japanese Home Ministry on 22 June 1910. The bureau came under much criticism for its ineffectiveness, and on 10 June 1929, it was elevated into a separate cabinet-level ministry under Prime Minister Giichi Tanaka.

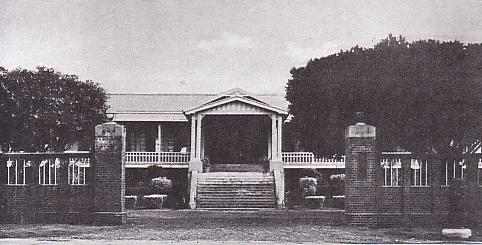
Headquarters of the government of the South Seas Mandate in Saipan

The new ministry was intended to coordinate emigration and settlement in all exterior territories of Japan, and had supervisory responsibility for Japanese controlled territory of Korea (朝鮮, Chōsen), of Taiwan (台湾, Taiwan), of Karafuto (樺太, Karafuto) (or South Sakhalin), of Nanyo (南洋, Nan'yō) (or South Seas Mandate), and the Kwantung Leased Territory (関東, Kantō).

However, the ministry did not actually sponsor emigration to those territories. It only provided advice and cooperated with private emigration sponsorship companies.

The ministry also oversaw operations of the South Manchuria Railway Company, but its authority did not extend to Manchuria due to strong resistance by the Ministry of War, who wanted to keep control over the future economic development of Manchuria to itself.

Likewise, the Governor-General of Korea, who was accustomed to virtual autonomy, rejected the new ministry's control and continued to administer Korea with little interference.

On 1 November 1942, the Ministry of Colonial Affairs was abolished, and its functions divided between the Japanese Foreign Ministry and the newly created Ministry of Greater East Asia.

== List of ministers of colonial affairs ==
Portrait	Name	Term of office		Cabinet
1	Baron Tanaka Giichi 田中 義一	10 June 1929	2 July 1929	Tanaka
2	Matsuda Genji 松田 源治	2 July 1929	14 April 1931	Hamaguchi
3	Hara Shūjirō 原 脩次郎	14 April 1931	9 September 1931	2nd Wakatsuki
4	Baron Wakatsuki Reijirō 若槻 礼次郎	9 September 1931	13 December 1931	2nd Wakatsuki
5	Hata Toyosuke 秦 豊助	13 December 1931	26 May 1932	Inukai
6	Nagai Ryūtarō 永井 柳太郎	26 May 1932	8 July 1934	Saitō
7	Okada Keisuke 岡田 啓介	8 July 1934	9 October 1934	Okada
8	Count Kodama Hideo 兒玉 秀雄	9 October 1934	9 March 1936	Okada
9	Nagata Hidejirō 永田秀次郎	9 March 1936	2 February 1937	Hirota
10	Yūki Toyotarō 結城 豊太郎	2 February 1937	4 June 1937	Hayashi
11	Ōtani Sonyu 大谷 尊由	4 June 1937	26 May 1938	1st Konoe
12	Ugaki Kazushige 宇垣 一成	26 May 1938	30 September 1938	1st Konoe
13	Prince Konoe Fumimaro 近衞 文麿	30 September 1938	29 October 1938	1st Konoe
14	Hatta Yoshiaki 八田 嘉明	29 October 1938	7 April 1939	1st Konoe
15	Koiso Kuniaki 小磯國昭	7 April 1939	30 August 1939	Hiranuma
16	Kanemitsu Tsuneo 金光 庸夫	30 August 1939	16 January 1940	Abe
17	Koiso Kuniaki 小磯國昭	16 January 1940	22 July 1940	Yonai
18	Matsuoka Yōsuke 松岡 洋右	22 July 1940	28 September 1940	2nd Konoe
19	Akita Kiyoshi 秋田 清	28 September 1940	18 July 1941	2nd Konoe
20	Toyoda Teijirō 豊田 貞次郎	18 July 1941	18 October 1941	3rd Konoe
21	Tōgō Shigenori 東郷茂徳	18 October 1941	2 December 1941	Tōjō
22	Ino Hiroya 井野 碩哉	2 December 1941	2 November 1942	Tōjō

== Bibliography ==
- Beasley, W.G. (1991). Japanese Imperialism 1894-1945. Oxford University Press. ISBN 0-19-822168-1.
- Ching, Leo T.S. (2001). Becoming Japanese: Colonial Taiwan and the Politics of Identity Formation. University of California Press. ISBN 0-520-22553-8.
- Myers, Raymond; Mark R Peattie (1987). The Japanese Colonial Empire, 1895-1945. Princeton University Press. ISBN 0-691-10222-8.
- Townsend, Susan C. (2000). Yanihara Tadao and Japanese Colonial Policy: Redeeming Empire. RoutledgeCurzon. ISBN 0-7007-1275-5.
