= 1913 in rail transport =

This article lists events related to rail transport that occurred in 1913.

== Events ==
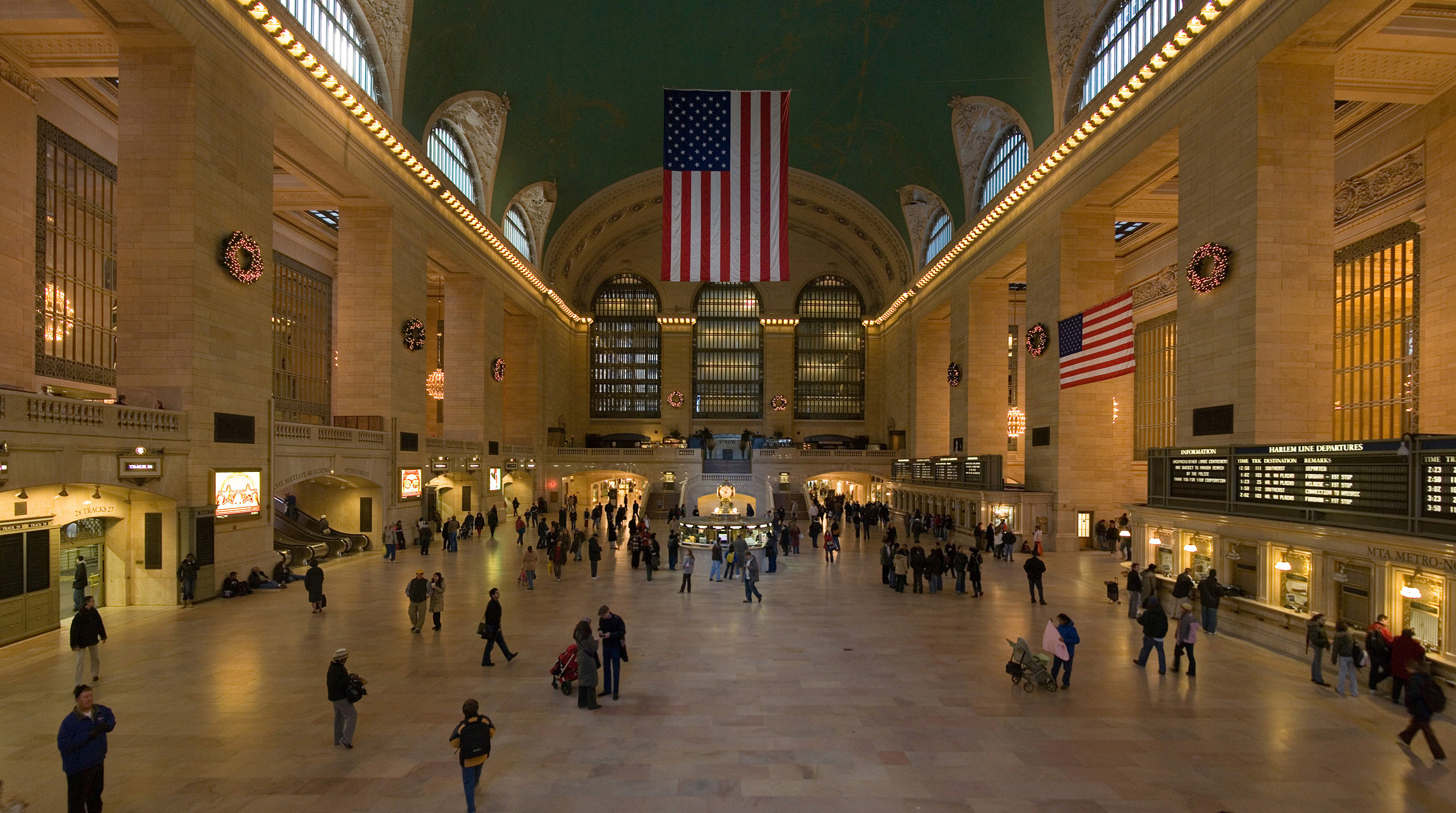
Grand Central Terminal, New York January 2006

=== January events ===
- January 13 - Julius Kruttschnitt leaves Union Pacific Railway and succeeds Robert S. Lovett as Chairman of the Executive Committee for the Southern Pacific Railroad.

=== February events ===
- February 1 - New York City's Grand Central Terminal opens as the world's largest train station to date.

=== May events ===
- May 7 - Tracklaying begins on the Graysonia, Nashville and Ashdown Railroad (a predecessor of Kansas City Southern Railway) between Murfreesboro and Shawmut, Arkansas.

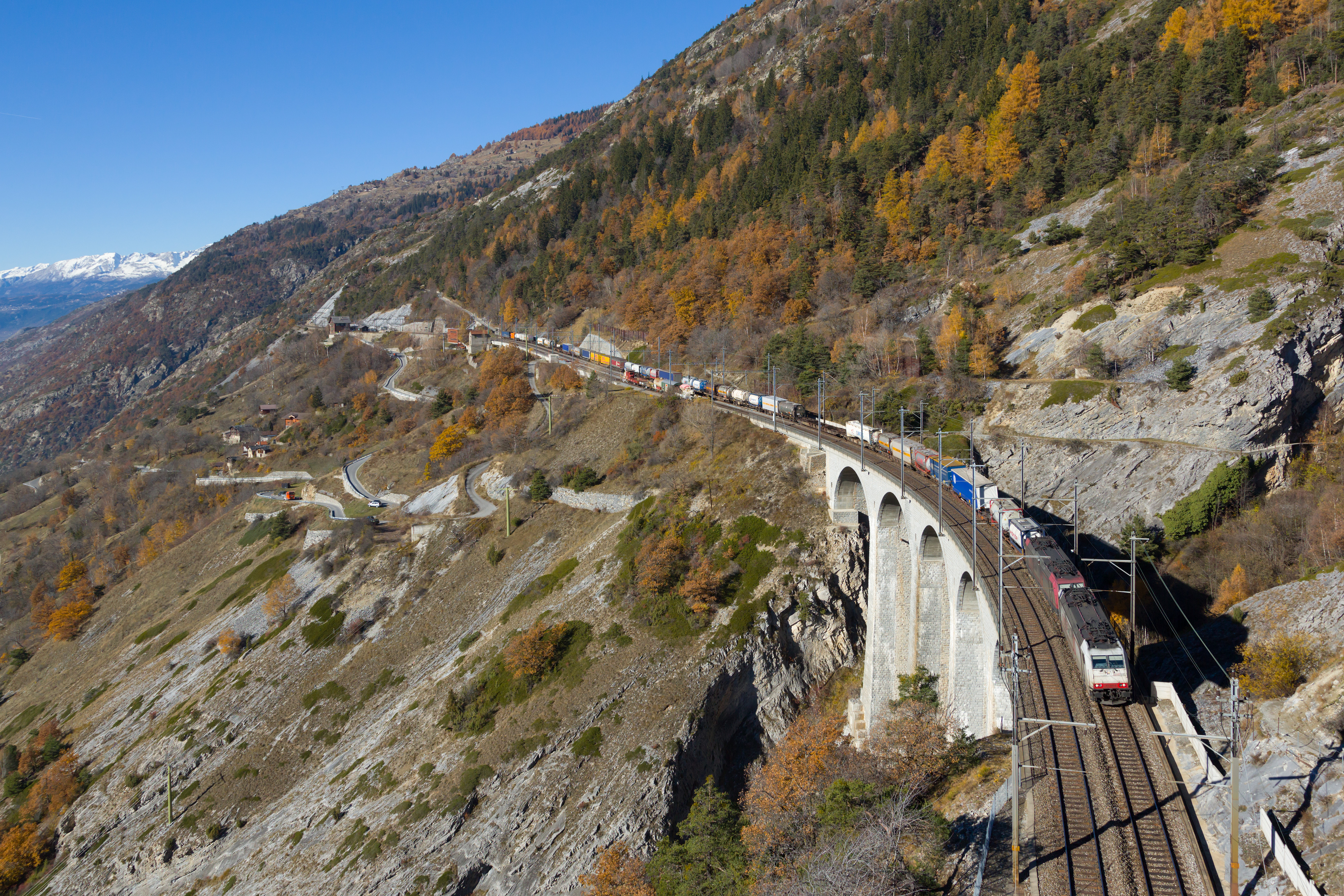
Lötschberg line

=== June events ===
- June 28/29 - Bever–Scuol-Tarasp railway opens in Switzerland.

=== July events ===
- July 2 - General Electric produces a gas-electric locomotive which is sold to the Electric Line of Minnesota as its #100 Dan Patch.
- July 15 - Opening of the Bern–Lötschberg–Simplon railway's Lötschberg railway line in Switzerland, including the 14.6 km (9.1 mi) Lötschberg Tunnel.

=== August events ===
- August 1 - The Alton and Southern Railroad is formed through the merger of the Alton and Southern Railroad Company, the Denverside Connecting Railroad and the Alton and Southern Railway.
- August 13 - Stainless steel (which will soon be used to construct passenger car bodies) is invented by Harry Brearley in Sheffield.
- August 21 - Construction begins on the Morrisburg and Ottawa Electric Railway just south of Billings Bridge, Ottawa.

=== September events ===
- September 1 – Howard Elliott succeeds Charles Sanger Mellen as president of New York, New Haven and Hartford Railroad.
- September 2 – Traveling at 40 miles per hour (64 km/h) in heavy fog north of New Haven, Connecticut, the White Mountain Express crashes through two cars of the Bar Harbor Express and overturns a third coach, killing 21 and injuring 50.

=== October events ===
- October 20 - The Chicago, Burlington and Quincy Railroad's tracks reach Casper, Wyoming, making Casper the busiest rail junction in Wyoming.

=== December events ===
- December 1 - First section of Buenos Aires Metro opened, the earliest metro system in the Southern Hemisphere or the Hispanophone world, and the southernmost.
- December 18 - Korekimi Nakamura steps down as president of South Manchuria Railway.
- December 19 - Ryutaro Nomura succeeds Korekimi Nakamura as president of South Manchuria Railway.
- December 26 - A major fire at its predecessor forces the new Michigan Central Station in Detroit to open early.

=== Unknown date events ===
- The Nickel Plate Road completes its grade separation project in Cleveland, Ohio.
- The Supreme Court of the United States orders the Union Pacific Railroad to sell all of its stock in the Southern Pacific Railroad.
- ALCO ceases new steam locomotive production at the former Rogers Locomotive Works plant in Paterson, New Jersey; ALCO continues producing new locomotives at its other plants.
- First examples of Class 140 C steam locomotives delivered to Chemins de Fer de l'État in France; 340 will eventually be built.
- The world’s first rail vehicle with diesel-electric transmission, and the first diesel of any type in regular revenue main line service, a 75 bhp (56 kW) railcar built by Atlas-Deva/Asea, enters service on the Södermanland Mellersta Railway in Sweden. It will remain in use until 1939.
- The Butte, Anaconda and Pacific Railway, a copper ore-hauling short line in Montana, electrifies using a 2,400 Volts DC system engineered by General Electric, the first primarily freight railroad in North America to electrify.
- Hejaz Railway Station opened in Damascus.
- First on-train cinema set up, on the Trans-Siberian Railway.
- William Finley is succeeded by Fairfax Harrison as president of the Southern Railway.
- Mary Averell Harriman, wife of the late Edward H. Harriman, creates the E. H. Harriman Award to recognize outstanding achievements in railway safety.

== Births ==
=== April births ===
- April 21 - Richard Beeching, chairman of the British Railways Board 1961–1965 (died 1985).

=== December births ===
- December 27 - Ian David Sinclair, president of Canadian Pacific Railway 1969-1981, is born (died 2006).

== Deaths ==
=== March deaths ===
- March 31 - J. P. Morgan, American financier who helped to finance United States Steel Corporation (born 1837).

=== April deaths ===
- April 22 - John Saxby, English railway signalling engineer (born 1821).

=== May deaths ===
- May 20 - Henry Morrison Flagler, visionary and builder of the Florida East Coast Railway (born 1830).

=== September deaths ===
- September 25 - Herbert William Garratt, English steam locomotive builder and inventor of the Garratt locomotive (born 1864).
