= Seijirō =

- Gender: Male

Origin
- Origin: Japanese
- Meaning: Different meanings depending on the kanji used

Seijirō, Seijiro or Seijirou (written: 征二郎 or 晴二郎) is a masculine Japanese given name. Notable people with the name include:

- Hirai Seijirō (平井 晴二郎) (1856–1926), Japanese railroad engineer
- Seijirō Kōyama (神山 征二郎) (born 1941), Japanese film director
