= Higher school (Japan) =

Tertiary education institution

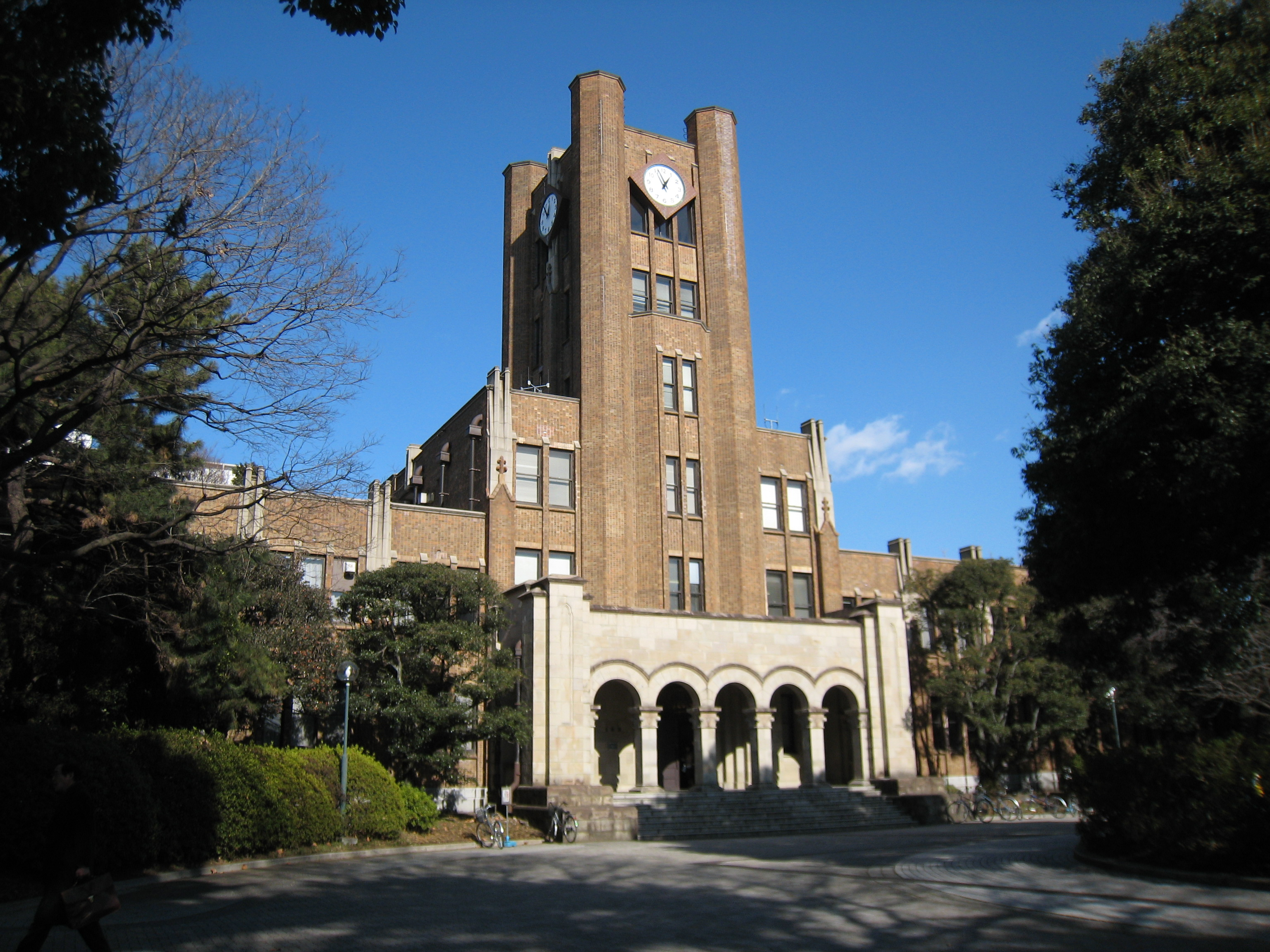
First Higher School's Main Hall (now Komaba Campus, University of Tokyo)

Higher school (高等学校, Kōtō Gakkō or 旧制高等学校, Kyūsei Kōtō Gakkō) was an institution of higher education in Japan, which was a preparatory institution for imperial universities and national medical colleges until the educational reform in occupied Japan.

Apart from the Imperial Japanese Army Academy and the Imperial Japanese Naval Academy, higher schools were the most prestigious pre-university higher education institutions in Japan and provided liberal arts education based on 'Kyōyōshugi' instead of specialised education.

The higher schools have now been converted or merged into universities. Despite the same name, Kōtō Gakkō (高等学校), higher schools are completely different to high schools (新制高等学校, Shinsei Kōtō Gakkō) after WW2.

== List ==
=== 3-year Schools ===
==== Number Schools ====
school name	The First Order of Higher Education (1894) era	The Second Order of Higher Education (1919)	Later part of
First Higher School (Tokyo)	Daigaku Yoka	Kōtōka	University of Tokyo
First Higher School (Tokyo)	Facultyl of Medicine (Chiba)	Independent as Chiba Medical College (1901)	Chiba Medical College (now Chiba University School of Medicine)
Second Higher School (Sendai)	Daigaku Yoka	Kōtōka	Tohoku University
Second Higher School (Sendai)	Faculty of medicine	Independent as Sendai Medical College (1901)	Tohoku Imperial University School of Medicine (Tohoku University School of Medicine)
Third Higher School (Kyoto)	Faculty of Law	1901 abolished	――――
Third Higher School (Kyoto)	Faculty of Engineering	1901 abolished	――――
Third Higher School (Kyoto)	Faculty of Medicine (Okayama)	Independent as Okayama Medical College (1901)	Okayama Medical College (now Okayama University School of Medicine)
Third Higher School (Kyoto)	Daigaku Yoka (1897)	Kōtōka	Kyoto University
Fourth Higher School (Kanazawa)	Daigaku Yoka	Kōtōka	Kanazawa University
Fourth Higher School (Kanazawa)	Faculty of medicine	Independent as Kanazawa Medical College (1901)	Kanazawa University School of Medicine
Fifth Higher School (Kumamoto)	Daigaku Yoka	Kōtōka	Kumamoto University
Fifth Higher School (Kumamoto)	Faculty of Medicine (Nagasaki)	Independent as Nagasaki Medical College (1901)	Nagasaki University School of Medicine
Fifth Higher School (Kumamoto)	Faculty of Engineering (1897)	Independent as Kumamoto Higher Technical School (1906)	Kumamoto University
Sixth Higher School (Okayama)	Daigaku Yoka (1900)	Kōtōka	Okayama University
Seventh Higher School, Zōshikan (Kagoshima)	Daigaku Yoka (1901)	Kōtōka	Kagoshima University
Eighth Higher School (Nagoya)	Daigaku Yoka (1908)	Kōtōka	Nagoya University

=== Name Schools ===
Year of establishment	school name	New university
1886	Yamaguchi Higher School	Yamaguchi University
1919	Niigata Higher School	Niigata University
1919	Matsumoto Higher School	Shinshu University
1919	Yamaguchi Higher School	Yamaguchi University
1919	Matsuyama Higher School	Ehime University
1920	Mito Higher School	Ibaraki University
1920	Yamagata Higher School	Yamagata University
1920	Saga Higher School	Saga University
1920	Hirosaki Higher School	Hirosaki University
1920	Matsue Higher School	Shimane University
1921	Osaka Higher School	Osaka University
1921	Urawa Higher School	Saitama University
1921	Fukuoka Higher School	Kyushu University
1922	Shizuoka Higher School	Shizuoka University
1922	Kochi Higher School	Kochi University
1923	Himeji Higher School	Kobe University (Himeji Branch)
1923	Hiroshima Higher School	Hiroshima University
1940	Ryojyun Higher School (Lushun, Manchukuo)	(abolition)
1943	Toyama Higher School	University of Toyama

==== Postwar Special Higher School ====
Predecessor medical and dental college of	school name	New university
Japan Women's Dental College	Nihon Higher School	Japan Women's Health Junior College (Now Kanagawa Dental University)
Toyo Women's Dental College	Toyo Higher School	Toyo Women's Junior College (now Toyo Gakuen University)
Akita Prefectural Women's Medical College	Akita Prefectural Higher School	(Closed in 1950, converted into Akita University)
Yamanashi Prefectural Medical College	Yamanashi Prefectural Higher School	(Closed in 1951, converted into Yamanashi University)
Yamanashi Prefectural Women's Medical College	Yamanashi Prefectural Higher School	(Closed in 1951, converted into Yamanashi University)
Tokushima Medical College	Tokushima Higher School	Tokushima University
Fukuoka Prefectural Medical and Dental College, Department of Medicine	Fukuoka Prefectural Higher School	(Closed in 1951, converted into Kyushu Dental University)
Nagasaki Medical University College of Medicine	Nagasaki Higher School	Nagasaki University

=== 7-year Schools ===
kinds	Year of establishment	school name	New university	New junior high school / high school
national	1921	Tokyo Higher School	University of Tokyo	Junior and Senior High School, University of Tokyo
national	1922	Taihoku Higher School (Taipei)	(Abolished, converted to National Taiwan Normal University)	
public	1923	Toyama Higher School	(Transferred to a national school in 1943, abolished the vulgaris department)	
public	1926	Naniwa Higher School (Osaka)	Osaka University	(Abolition of vulgar department)
public	1929	Tokyo Metropolitan Higher School (Tokyo)	Tokyo Metropolitan University	Metropolitan New Institution of Higher Education
private	1922	Musashi Higher School (Tokyo)	Musashi University	Musashi Junior and Senior High School
private	1923	Konan Higher School (Hyogo)	Konan University	Konan Junior and Senior High School
private	1925	Seikei Higher School (Tokyo)	Seikei University	Seikei Junior and Senior High School
private	1926	Seijo Higher School (Tokyo)	Seijo University	Seijo Gakuen Junior High School and High School

== See also ==
- Imperial Universities (帝国大学)
- Daigaku Yoka (大学予科)
- Specialized School (Japan) (旧制専門学校)
- Gakushuin Higher School (旧制学習院高等科)

== Sources ==
- Lewis, R.E. (1903). The Educational Conquest of the Far East. F.H. Revell. ISBN 978-0-524-03586-3.
