= Japan–Russia Secret Agreements =

Four treaties between 1907 and 1916

The Japan–Russia Secret Agreements were a series of four secret treaties signed between the Japanese Empire and the Russian Empire after the Russo-Japanese War, in order to secure and recognize the rights of both sides in areas of the East Asia, specifically the Korean Peninsula, Manchuria, and Mongolia. They were signed four times between 30 July 1907 and around 3 July 1916, however they were abrogated by the Soviet government after the Russian Revolution in 1917.

== Background ==
After the First Sino-Japanese War, Japan was faced with a conflict with Russia over its interests in Manchuria. There were two opinions in Japan, one that war between the two countries was inevitable and that Japan should prepare for it, and the other that every effort should be made to avoid war between the two countries. the Japanese Prime Minister Itō Hirobumi, preferred the second view and considered concluding a "Japan–Russia agreement" in which Japan would recognize Russia's interests in Manchuria and Russia would recognize Japan's interests on the Korean peninsula in exchange for the interests of Manchuria and Korea. However, this opinion was opposed by hardliners in Japan and the Russo-Japanese Agreement was replaced by the Anglo-Japanese Alliance (1902) with Russia as the imaginary enemy, which led to the Russo-Japanese War in 1904.

== Treaties ==
=== The First Treaty ===
After the Russo-Japanese War, the First Treaty was signed on 30 July 1907 by Motono Ichirō, the Japanese Ambassador in Moscow, and Alexander Izvolsky, the Foreign Minister of Russia. The treaty was divided into two parts: one is open agreement, which respected the treaties concluded between the two countries and China, respected China's independence, promoted open doors, and achieved equal opportunities and another is secret agreement, which defined the scope of Japan's interests in Southern Manchuria and Russia's interests in Northern Manchuria and Japan recognized Russia's interests in Outer Mongolia, and Russia recognized Japan's interests in the Korean Peninsula.

Anglo-Russian Convention was signed one month prior, permitted Russia to shift attention away from Central Asia and Persia towards normalizing relations with Japan. It stabilized Russia's western Asian front, reducing the threat of multi-front crises.

=== The Second Treaty ===
The Second Russo-Japanese Treaty was signed on 4 July 1910 by Motono Ichirō, the Japanese Ambassador in Moscow, and Alexander Izvolsky, the Russian Minister of Foreign Affairs, which explicitly rejected the United States' proposed South Manchurian Railway Neutrality Act (the Knox's proposal) and ensured the rights and interests of both sides in Manchuria. The treaty also provided for the suppression and extradition of Korean independence activists in Russia.

=== The Third Treaty ===
On 8 July 1912, Ambassador Motono Ichirō and Russian Foreign Minister Sergei Sazonov signed the Third Treaty against the background that, as a result of the outbreak of the 1911 Revolution in China, the Republic of China replaced the Qing Dynasty and Japan and Russia divided the spheres of influence of the two countries in Inner Mongolia, with the treaty stipulating that the western sphere of influence of Inner Mongolia belonged to Russia and the eastern sphere of influence of Inner Mongolia to Japan.

=== The Fourth Treaty ===
On 3 July 1916, Ambassador Motono Ichirō and Russian Foreign Minister Sergei Sazonov signed the Fourth Treaty, which strengthened the alliance between the two countries during World War I and protected their rights and interests in Manchuria and Mongolia from Chinese challenges. The Russo-Japanese alliance ended in 1918 with the fall of the Tsarist Empire at the end of World War I.

== Historical influence ==
With the outbreak of the Russian Revolution in 1917, the Soviet Union replaced the Tsarist Empire and although the Soviet government abrogated the treaty, the Soviet Union still inherited interests in Northern Manchuria and Outer Mongolia. In order to avoid clashes with the Japanese Empire, some level of cooperation similar to that existing under the secret treaties had to be reestablished. As a result, a basic agreement to regulate relations between the Soviet Union and the Japanese Empire was concluded in Beijing in 1925. In 1921 The Soviet Union assisted the Mongolian People's Revolutionary Party in expelling the Chinese Beiyang government's garrison in Outer Mongolia and was at war with Zhang Xueliang's Northeastern Army over the Chinese Eastern Railway conflict in 1929 can be seen as a continuation of Soviet interests in these areas. But on the other hand, both the Tsarist Empire and the Soviet Union were wary of Japanese power in Manchuria due to Russia's defeat in the Russo-Japanese War, and in the forty years following the Russo-Japanese War, the Tsarist and later Soviet governments were careful to maintain a balance of power with Japan in the Far East and did not offend Japanese interests in Southern Manchuria and Inner Mongolia. After the Mukden Incident, faced with Japan bringing all of Manchuria under its control, the Soviet Union sold its right and interest in the Chinese Eastern Railway to Manchukuo and withdrew from Manchuria in 1935.

However, the Soviet Union still maintained its interests in Outer Mongolia, and in 1939 the Soviet Union and Japan fought a four-month war at Khalkh River the border between Outer Mongolia and Manchuria because the Soviet Union believed that Japan had violated the Soviet Union's sphere of influence in Outer Mongolia. On 14 March 1941, the Soviet–Japanese Neutrality Pact signed by the Soviet Union and Japan reaffirmed the respective spheres of influence in Manchuria and in Inner and Outer Mongolia, which became the basis for the determination of the statehood of Outer Mongolia (Mongolian People's Republic) in the Yalta Agreement of February 1945. The Japan-Russia Secret Agreement ultimately led to the complete separation between Outer Mongolian and Inner Mongolia.
