= Mayors of Tokyo =

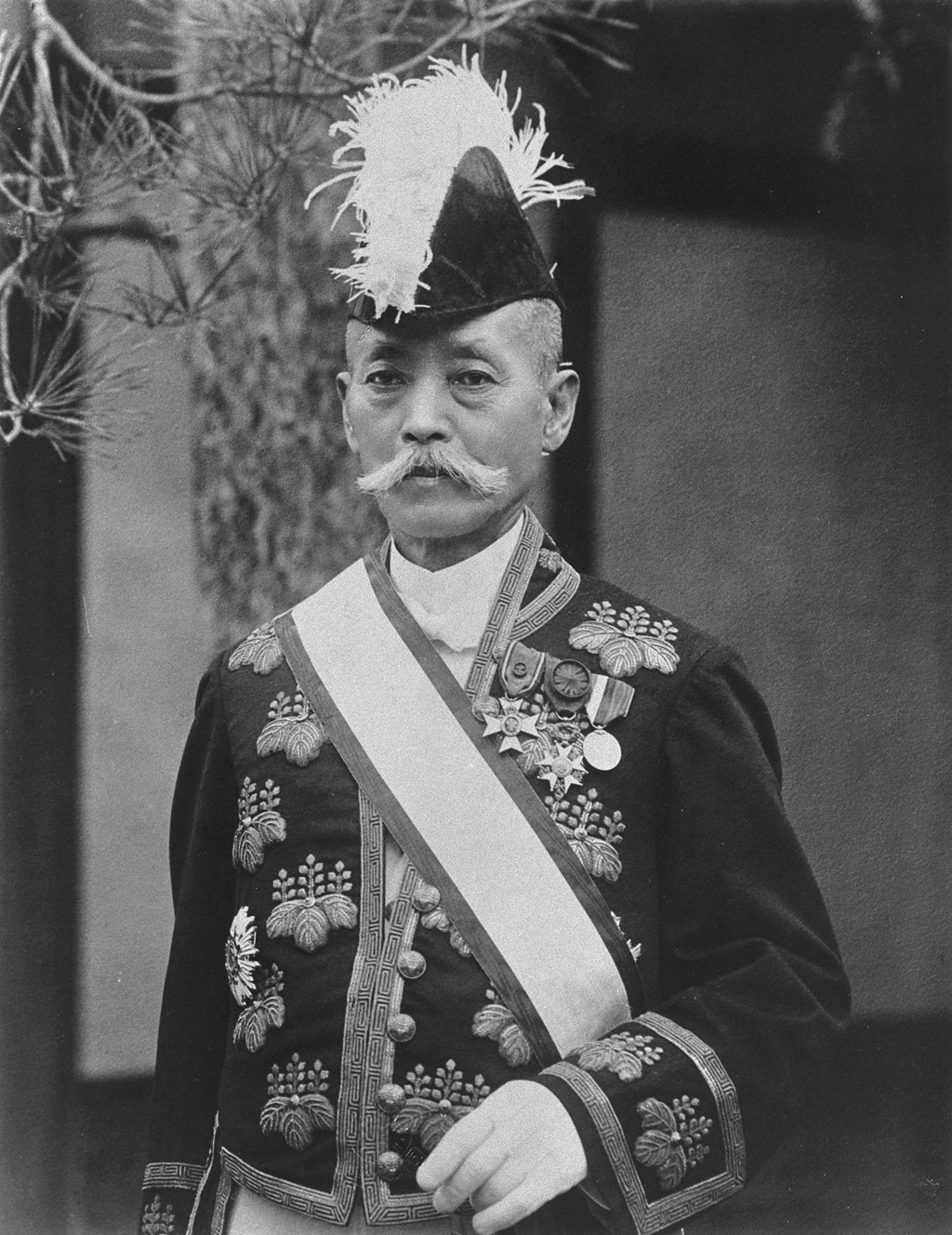
Ozaki Yukio from 1903 to 1912

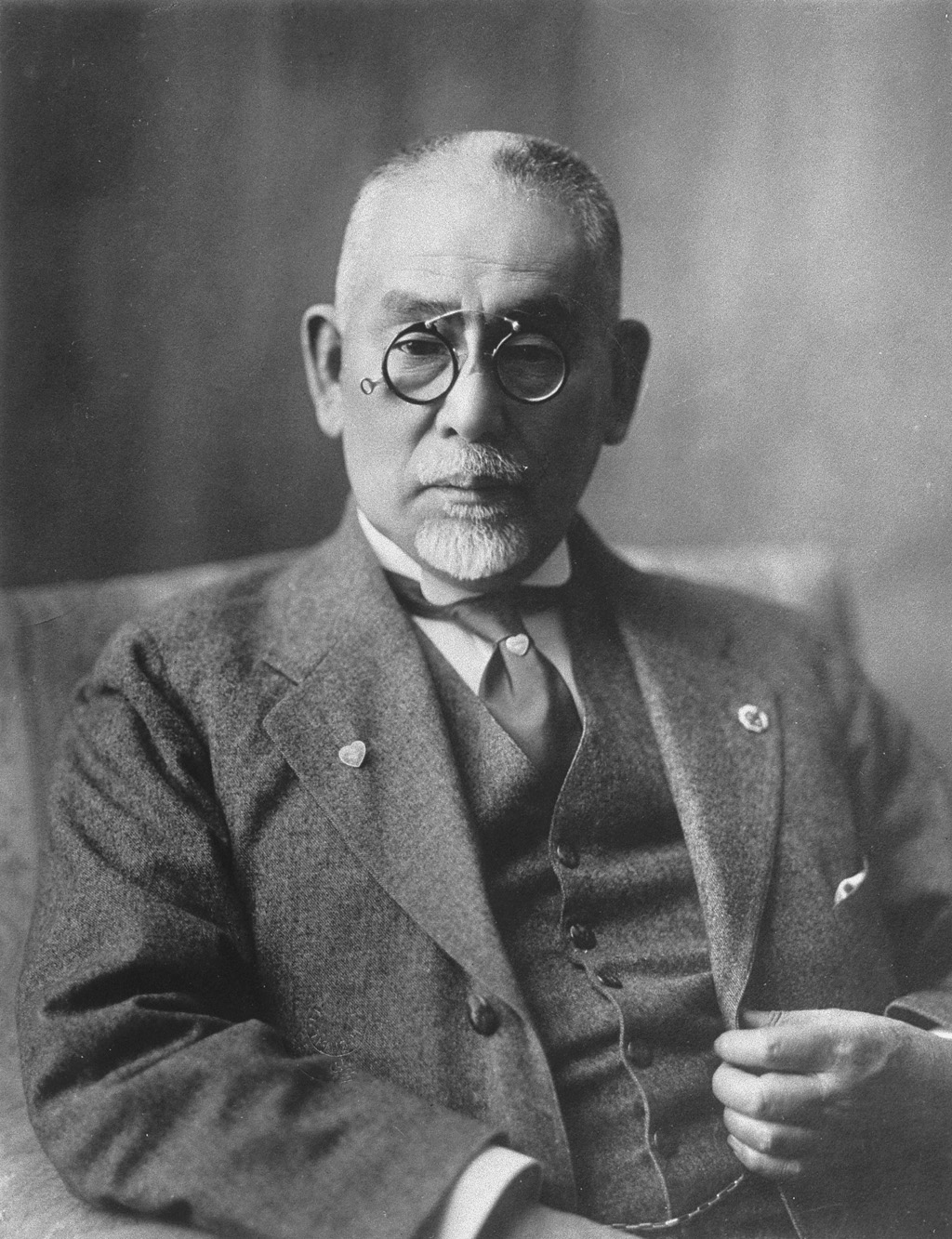
Gotō Shinpei from 1920 to 1923

This is a list of mayors of Tokyo from 1898 to 1943. Prior to 1898 the Mayor of Tokyo was also the Governor of Tokyo. In 1943, the city's independent institutions were absorbed by the prefectural administration resulting in the cessation of the office of mayor.

Most mayors of Tokyo were graduates of Tokyo Imperial University or previously worked at the Home Ministry.

== Mayors of Tokyo (1898–1943) ==
- Matsuda Hideo (6 October 1898 – 16 June 1903)
- Ozaki Yukio (29 June 1903 – 29 June 1912) two terms
- Sakatani Yoshiro (12 July 1912 – 25 February 1915)
- Okuda Yoshito (15 June 1915 – 21 August 1917)
- Tajiri Inajirō (5 April 1918 – 27 November 1920)
- Gotō Shinpei (17 December 1920 – 27 April 1923)
- Nagata Hidejirō (29 May 1923 – 8 September 1924)
- Nakamura Yoshikoto (8 October 1924 – 8 June 1926)
- Izawa Takio (16 July 1926 – 23 October 1926)
- Nishikubo Hiromichi (29 October 1926 – 12 December 1927)
- Ichiki Otohiko (7 January 1928 – 14 February 1929)
- Horikiri Zenjiro (24 April 1929 – 12 May 1930)
- Nagata Hidejirō (30 May 1930 – 25 January 1933)
- Ushizuka Toratarō (10 May 1933 – 9 May 1937)
- Kobashi Ichita (28 June 1937 – 14 April 1939)
- Tanomogi Keikichi (24 April 1939 – 19 February 1940)
- Okubo Tomejiro (12 May 1940 – 22 July 1942)
- General Kishimoto Ayao (3 August 1942 – 30 June 1943)

== See also ==
- Politics of Tokyo City
