= Hidejirō Nagata =

Japanese politician

Senior Third Rank Hidejirō Nagata
- 永田 秀次郎
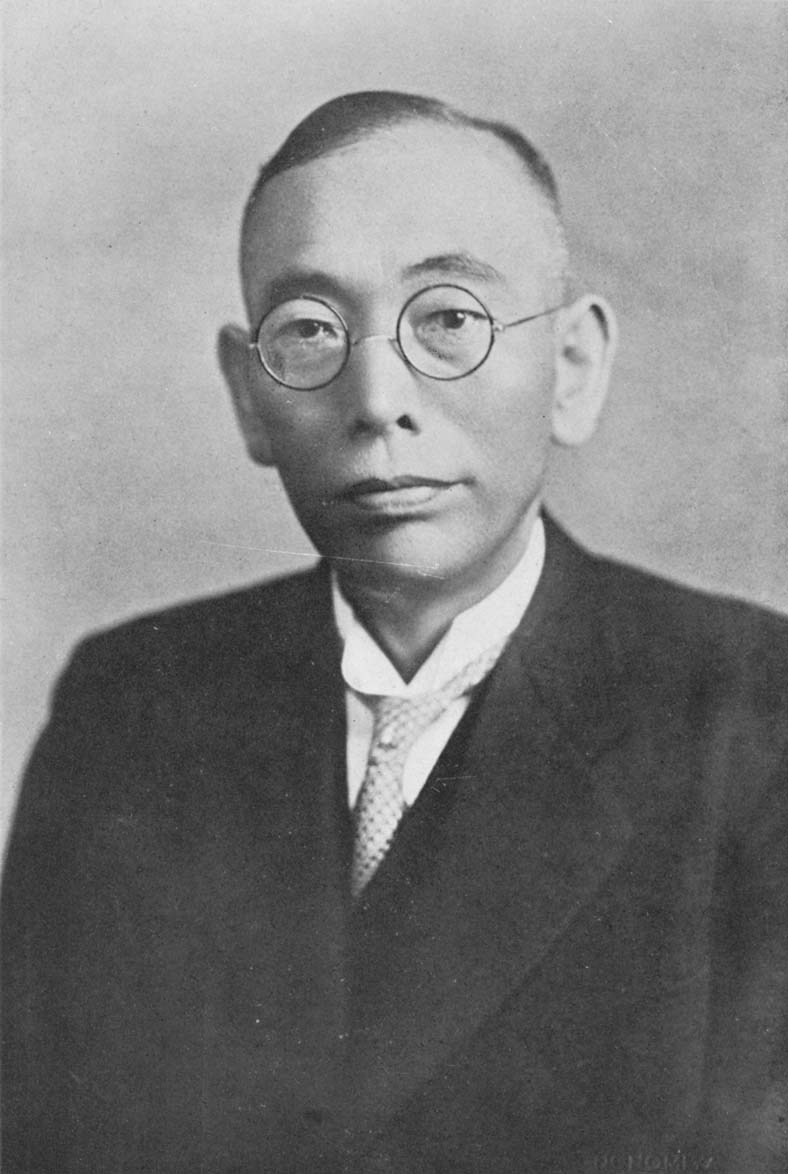

Minister of Railways
- In office 29 November 1939 – 14 January 1940
- Prime Minister: Nobuyuki Abe
- Preceded by: Ryūtarō Nagai
- Succeeded by: Tsuruhei Matsuno

Minister of Colonial Affairs
- In office 9 March 1936 – 2 February 1937
- Prime Minister: Kōki Hirota
- Preceded by: Hideo Kodama
- Succeeded by: Toyotarō Yūki

Member of the House of Peers
- In office 21 September 1918 – 17 September 1943 Nominated by the Emperor

Mayor of Tokyo
- In office 30 May 1930 – 25 January 1933
- Preceded by: Zenjirō Horikiri
- Succeeded by: Toratarō Ushizuka
- In office 29 May 1923 – 8 September 1924
- Preceded by: Gotō Shinpei
- Succeeded by: Nakamura Yoshikoto

Governor of Mie Prefecture
- In office 28 April 1916 – 23 October 1916
- Monarch: Taishō
- Preceded by: Eitaro Mabuchi
- Succeeded by: Miki Nagano

Personal details
- Born: 23 July 1876 Mihara, Hyōgo, Japan
- Died: 17 September 1943 (aged 67) Zōshigaya, Tokyo, Japan
- Party: Independent
- Education: Third Higher School

Hidejirō Nagata (永田秀次郎, Nagata Hidejirō; 23 July 1876 – 17 September 1943), was a politician and cabinet minister in the Empire of Japan, serving as a member of the House of Peers of the Diet of Japan, twice as a cabinet minister, and also serving twice as mayor of Tokyo.

== Biography ==
Nagata was born in Mihara District, Hyōgo Prefecture, in what is now part of the city of Minamiawaji. After graduating from the Third Higher School (predecessor of Kyoto Imperial University) and serving as a school principal in Sumoto, Hyōgo from 1902 to 1904, he obtained a posting in the Home Ministry and rose to become head of the Kyoto Prefectural Police Department. From April to October 1916, Nagata was appointed governor of Mie Prefecture, returning afterwards to the Home Ministry to head the Public Security Bureau. From December 22, 1920, to May 29, 1923, he served as Deputy Mayor of Tokyo.

From May 29, 1923, to September 8, 1924, Nagata was appointed mayor of Tokyo, and was thus in office during the 1923 Great Kantō earthquake of September 1, which destroyed most of the city. In 1926, he published a book titled Return to the Spirit of the Founding of the Japanese State, to help promote the new national holiday of National Foundation Day, which he had helped create two years previously through lobbying effects of a right-wing organization which he led.

From May 1929, Nagata became president of Takushoku University. Nagata returned as mayor of Tokyo again from May 30, 1930, to January 25, 1933. He was a strong supporter for the hosting of the 1940 Summer Olympics in Tokyo. For Nagata, it was essential that Tokyo host the 1940 Olympics, as the date coincided with the Japanese 2600th Anniversary celebrations. He was forced to resign after a police sweep rounded up 6900 suspected communists in Tokyo.

Nagata subsequently served in the House of Peers in the Diet of Japan. From March 9, 1936 to February 2, 1937, Nagata was appointed Minister of Colonial Affairs under the Kōki administration. He returned to the cabinet as Railway Minister under the Abe administration from November 29, 1939, to January 14, 1940.

Nagata was also one of the founders of the Japan Football Association.

Political offices
Preceded by Eitarō Mabuchi	Governor of Mie Prefecture; 1916	Succeeded by Nagano Miki/Kan
Preceded by Kurahei Yuasa	Chief of the Home Ministry Police Affairs Bureau; 1916–1918	Succeeded by Takeji Kawamura
Preceded by Shinpei Gotō	Mayor of Tokyo; 1923–1924	Succeeded by Yoshikoto Nakamura
Preceded by Zenjirō Horikiri	Mayor of Tokyo; 1930–1933	Succeeded by Toratarō Ushizuka
Preceded by Hideo Kodama	Minister of Colonial Affairs; 1936–1937	Succeeded by Toyotarō Yūki
Preceded by Ryūtarō Nagai	Railway Minister; 1939–1940	Succeeded by Tsuruhei Matsuno
Academic offices
Preceded by Shinpei Gotō	President of Takushoku University; 1919–1943	Succeeded by Kazushige Ugaki
