= Fukai =

Fukai (written: 深井) is a Japanese surname. Notable people with the surname include:

- Eigo Fukai (深井 英五, 1871–1945), Japanese businessman and banker
- James Fukai (born 1974), American musician
- Kazuki Fukai (深井 一希, born 1995), Japanese footballer
- Masaki Fukai (深井 正樹, born 1980), Japanese footballer
- Shirō Fukai (深井 史郎, 1907–1959), Japanese composer
- Shuhei Fukai (深井 脩平, born 1993), Japanese footballer

== See also ==
- Fukai Station, a railway station in Osaka Prefecture, Japan
