= Politics of Tokyo City =

Overview of politics of Tokyo City in the Empire

The politics of Tokyo City, as the capital of the Empire of Japan, took place under special regulations that limited its local autonomy compared to other municipalities in Japan. In 1943, the city's independent institutions were eliminated altogether under the authoritarian Tōjō cabinet and the administration was absorbed by the appointed government of Tokyo prefecture.

== Historical background ==
As one of the "three capitals" (santo) of Japan, Tokyo city was initially not allowed to elect its mayor when (albeit limited) local autonomy for Japanese municipalities was introduced in the Meiji era, mostly following a Prussian model. In the prefectures of Tokyo, Ōsaka and Kyōto, the appointed Prefectural governor also took the role of mayor of the prefectural capital under a special imperial ordinance, the shisei tokurei (市制特例). Elections for the city council and the prefectural assembly took place as in other parts of the country. When one of the major goals of the Freedom and People's Rights Movement, a national-level parliamentary representation had been achieved in form of the Imperial Diet, its constitutional successor parties (mintō, the "civil" or "democratic" parties opposed to the parties that supported the Meiji oligarchs in government) in the House of Representatives sought to repeal the Imperial ordinance that barred the three largest cities from having independent mayors; but resistance from the House of Peers kept the regulation alive until 1898 when the upper house passed its abolition. From then on the mayor of Tokyo city was appointed independently from the governor and prefectural and city administration were separated. Finally, beginning in the 1920s, the mayor was elected by the city council from among its members. Tokyo's politics changed drastically during the 1950s when the U.S. completely reshaped the government of Japan, by transforming it into a democracy and reforming the entire education and administrative system.

== National representation ==
Tokyo city was initially represented by nine members in the House of Representatives, the elected lower house of the Imperial Diet: In the initial election of 1890, Tokyo city's wards were distributed over nine single-member electoral districts (Tokyo 1 to 9). In the early 20th century it elected eleven Representatives in the Tokyo city district. During the short return to single-member districts in the elections of 1920 and 1924, the city was covered by eleven single-member districts. After that, Tokyo city (in its pre-1932 borders) elected 18 Representatives in four districts. With the expansion of Tokyo city in 1932, it also extended into the 5th and 6th districts with five representatives each.

As in many urban areas, liberal candidates from parties opposed to the dominating Seiyūkai were relatively successful in Tokyo city. In the 1930s, Tokyo elected some Socialist Representatives to the House. In the last mostly free, pre-war general election of 1937, candidates from the Socialist Mass Party (Shakai Taishūtō) received the highest vote in Tokyo's 1st, 2nd, 4th, 5th and 6th districts and finished second in the 3rd district, though a majority of votes and seats went to the Minseitō with the Seiyūkai taking the second largest share. One prominent exception from Minseitō success in Tokyo city was Seiyūkai candidate Ichirō Hatoyama (2nd district) who later sided with the "orthodox" faction (liberal wing led by Kuhara, opposed to the militarist "progressive" faction) in the Seiyūkai split of 1939 and went on to play a major role in occupation and postwar democratic politics.

== Prefectural representation ==
As is the case today in designated cites, Tokyo city's wards served as multi-member electoral districts for the Prefectural Assembly electing up to five assemblymen in every district under the "three new regional laws" (chihō-san-shinpō) of 1878 that established the prefectural assemblies.

== Mayor ==
Tokyo city's first independent mayor was Hideo Matsuda who was at the same time a Progressive member of the House of Representatives. He served until 1903 and was succeeded by Yukio Ozaki who is remembered in the United States for a gift of cherry trees that line the Potomac River in the District of Columbia. His nine-year administration also brought many improvements in infrastructure to Tokyo city. After that, Tokyo city had seven different mayors until 1926, none of whom served for longer than three years.

Elected mayors of Tokyo city include former Bank of Japan governor Otohiko Ichiki, former Takushoku University president and Mie governor Hidejirō Nagata and former Tokyo governor Toratarō Ushizuka. Tokyo city's last mayor was a general of the Imperial Army, Ayao Kishimoto. Elected in August 1942, he oversaw the absorption of Tokyo city's independent institutions by the prefectural administration and in 1943 handed over to governor Shigeo Ōdachi who was now directly responsible to the central government.

== Council ==
The Tokyo city council (Tōkyō-shikai) was established in 1889 together with the city itself. As in Osaka and Kyoto, it had to face a governor who acted as mayor and the pre-existing ward chiefs (ku-chō) who were also appointed, not elected. And since there was no independent city administration, the council's authority was very limited until the separation of prefectural and city executive in 1898.

== See also ==
- Politics of Tokyo
