= Hiromichi Nishikubo =

Japanese politician

Senior Fourth Rank Hiromichi Nishikubo
- 西久保 弘道
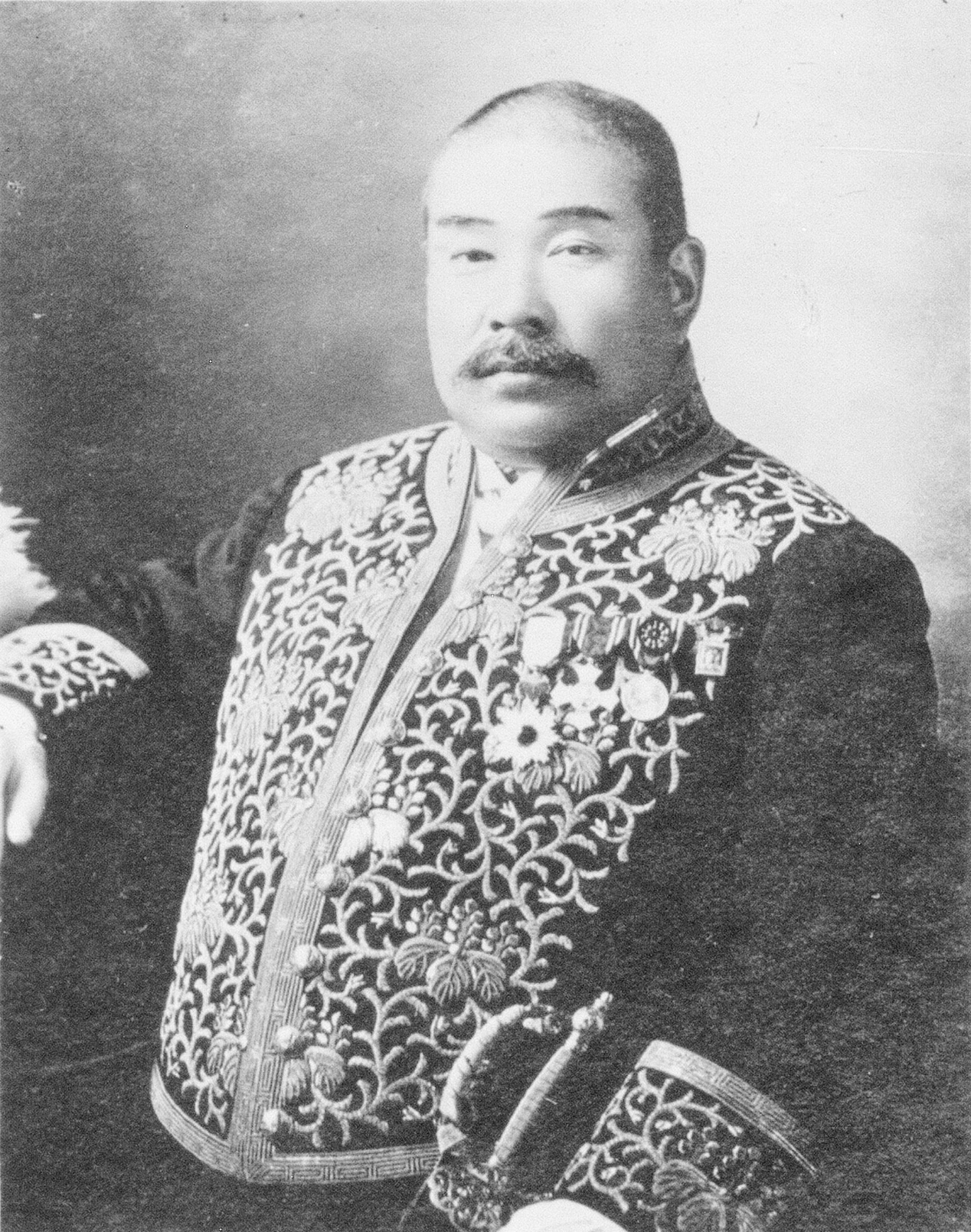

Mayor of Tokyo
- In office 29 October 1926 – 12 December 1927
- Preceded by: Takio Izawa
- Succeeded by: Otohiko Ichiki

Member of the House of Peers
- In office 5 October 1916 – 8 July 1930 Nominated by the Emperor

Superintendent General of the Tokyo Metropolitan Police Department
- In office 12 August 1915 – 9 October 1916
- Preceded by: Takio Izawa
- Succeeded by: Bunji Okada

13th Director-General of the Hokkaidō Agency
- In office 21 April 1914 – 12 August 1915
- Monarch: Taishō
- Preceded by: Nakamura Junkurō
- Succeeded by: Magoichi Tawara

Governor of Fukushima Prefecture
- In office 12 February 1910 – 1 June 1913
- Monarchs: Meiji; Taishō
- Preceded by: Shōtarō Nishizawa
- Succeeded by: Masahiro Ōta

Personal details
- Born: 30 June 1863 Nabeshima, Hizen, Japan
- Died: 8 July 1930 (aged 67) Ichikawa, Chiba, Japan
- Education: Tokyo Imperial University

Hiromichi Nishikubo (西久保 弘道, Nishikubo Hiromichi; 30 June 1863 – 8 July 1930) was a Japanese bureaucrat, politician, and kendo master, who served as Governor of Fukushima Prefecture (1910–1913), Director-General of the Hokkaido Agency (1914–1915), Superintendent-General of the Metropolitan Police (1915–1916), Mayor of Tokyo (1926–1927), and a member of the House of Peers (1916–1930).

== Early life ==
Hiromichi Nishikubo was born in 1863 in Nabeshima Village, Saga District, Hizen Province (now part of Saga, Saga Prefecture).

He was the eldest son of a lower-ranking samurai family from Nabeshima Village. He later studied law, attending the Ministry of Justice Law School and completing his higher legal studies in Tokyo before entering government service in the 1890s.

== Honours ==
- Order of the Sacred Treasure, 4th class (26 December 1910)
- Order of the Sacred Treasure, 2nd class (19 January 1916)
- Order of the Rising Sun, 2nd class (1 April 1916)
- Order of the Sacred Treasure, 1st class (8 July 1930)
