= Hisaakira Hijikata =

Japanese banker (1870–1942)

- 土方 久徴
- Hisaakira Hijikata

12th Governor of the Bank of Japan
- In office 12 June 1928 – 4 June 1935
- Preceded by: Junnosuke Inoue
- Succeeded by: Eigo Fukai

Personal details
- Born: October 8, 1870 Mie, Japan
- Died: August 25, 1942 (aged 71) Tokyo, Japan
- Education: Tokyo Imperial University

Hisaakira Hijikata (土方 久徴, Hijikata Hisaakira; October 8, 1870 – August 25, 1942) was a Japanese businessman, central banker and the 12th Governor of the Bank of Japan (BOJ).

== Early life ==
Hijikata was born in Mie Prefecture.

== Career ==
In 1897, Hijikata was a BOJ trainee along with Junnosuke Inoue. Both young men were sent by the bank to learn about British banking practices in London.

In 1918, Hijikata was named head of the Industrial Bank of Japan.

Hijikata was Governor of the Bank of Japan from June 12, 1928 through June 4, 1935. During his tenure, financial difficulties in Europe and the suspension of the gold standard by the United Kingdom affected Japan; and the situation was exacerbated by the "Manchurian disturbance".

== Notes ==
Government offices
Preceded by Junnosuke Inoue (2nd term)	Governor of the Bank of Japan; 1928–1935	Succeeded by Eigo Fukai
