= Junnosuke Inoue =

Japanese central banker (1869–1932)

Junior Second Rank Inoue Junnosuke
- 井上 準之助
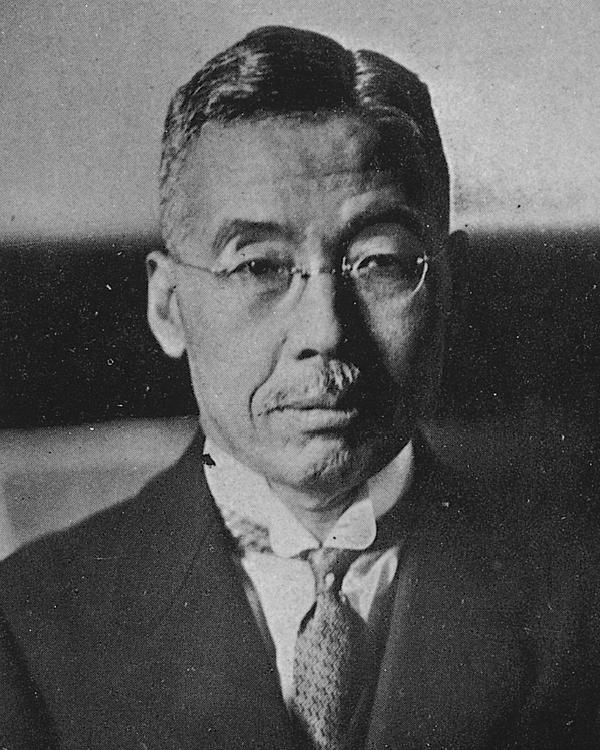

Minister of Finance
- In office 2 July 1929 – 13 December 1931
- Prime Minister: Hamaguchi Osachi; Wakatsuki Reijirō
- Preceded by: Chūzō Mitsuchi
- Succeeded by: Takahashi Korekiyo
- In office 2 September 1923 – 7 January 1924
- Prime Minister: Yamamoto Gonnohyōe
- Preceded by: Otohiko Ichiki
- Succeeded by: Kazue Shōda

Governor of the Bank of Japan
- In office 10 May 1927 – 12 June 1928
- Prime Minister: Tanaka Giichi
- Preceded by: Otohiko Ichiki
- Succeeded by: Hisaakira Hijikata
- In office 13 March 1919 – 2 September 1923
- Prime Minister: Hara Takashi; Takahashi Korekiyo; Katō Tomosaburō
- Preceded by: Yatarō Mishima
- Succeeded by: Otohiko Ichiki

Member of the House of Peers
- In office 9 January 1924 – 9 February 1932 Nominated by the Emperor

Personal details
- Born: 6 May 1869 Hita, Ōita, Japan
- Died: 9 February 1932 (aged 62) Tokyo, Japan
- Party: Rikken Minseitō
- Education: Tokyo Imperial University

Junnosuke Inoue (井上 準之助, Inoue Junnosuke; May 6, 1869 – February 9, 1932) was a Japanese financier and statesman of the Taisho and Showa eras. He was the 9th and 11th Governor of the Bank of Japan (BOJ), and Minister of Finance in 1923-1924 and 1929-1931. He was assassinated during the League of Blood Incident in 1932.

== Biography ==
Inoue was born in Ōita Prefecture. He graduated from the Imperial University of Tokyo.

In 1896, Inoue entered the Bank of Japan and in 1897 he was a BOJ trainee along with Hisaakira Hijikata. Both young men were sent by the bank to learn about British banking practices in London. From 1913-1919, Inoue was head of the Yokohama Specie Bank. Inoue was Governor of the Bank of Japan from March 13, 1919 – September 2, 1923 and again from May 10, 1927 – June 1, 1928.

He was Minister of Finance in 1923-1924 and 1929-1931. He briefly presided the Institute of Pacific Relations between Ray Lyman Wilbur nomination as United States Secretary of the Interior and his own second nomination as Japan Minister of Finances.

In 1932, Inoue was one of the two prominent Japanese assassinated in the League of Blood Incident.

Political offices
Preceded by Otohiko Ichiki	Minister of Finance; 1923–1924	Succeeded by Kazue Shōda
Preceded by Chuzo Mitsuchi	Minister of Finance; 1929–1931	Succeeded by Korekiyo Takahashi
Government offices
Preceded by Yatarō Mishima	Governor of the Bank of Japan (1st term); 1919–1923	Succeeded by Otohiko Ichiki
Preceded by Otohiko Ichiki	(2nd term); 1927–1928	Succeeded by Hisaakira Hijikata
