= Yatarō Mishima =

Japanese banker and Governor of the Bank of Japan (1913–1919)

Viscount Yatarō Mishima
- 三島 彌太郎
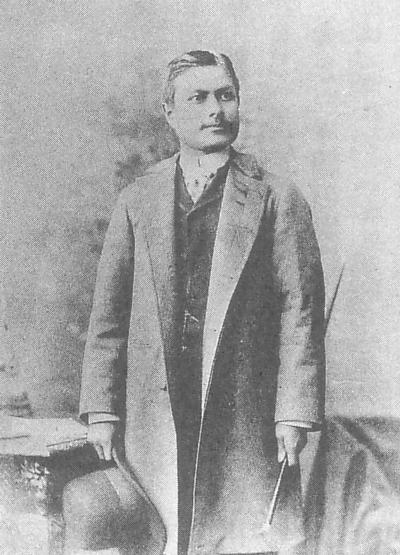
- Viscount Yatarō Mishima

8th Governor of the Bank of Japan
- In office 28 February 1913 – 7 March 1919
- Prime Minister: Yamamoto Gonnohyōe; Ōkuma Shigenobu; Terauchi Masatake; Hara Takashi
- Preceded by: Takahashi Korekiyo
- Succeeded by: Junnosuke Inoue

Member of the House of Peers
- In office 10 July 1897 – 7 March 1919 Elected by the Viscounts

Personal details
- Born: 4 May 1867 Kagoshima, Satsuma, Japan
- Died: 7 March 1919 (aged 51)
- Resting place: Aoyama Cemetery
- Spouse(s): Ōyama Nobuko (div.); Shijō Kaneko
- Children: Mishima Michiharu
- Parent: Mishima Michitsune (father)
- Education: Komaba Agricultural School; Massachusetts Agricultural College (now University of Massachusetts Amherst); Cornell University (M.A.)
- Occupation: Businessman, banker, politician
- Known for: 8th Governor of the Bank of Japan

Viscount Yatarō Mishima (三島 彌太郎 (Mishima Yatarō); 4 May 1867 – 7 March 1919) was a Japanese businessman, banker, and politician best known for serving as the eighth Governor of the Bank of Japan from 1913 to 1919. During his tenure he helped stabilize Japan’s monetary system in the aftermath of the Russo–Japanese War and during World War I. He was also a member of the House of Peers.

== Early life and education ==
Mishima was born in Kagoshima Prefecture into a samurai family; his father was Mishima Michitsune, later governor of Tochigi Prefecture.

He studied English and agriculture at the Komaba Agricultural School and then abroad at the Massachusetts Agricultural College (now the University of Massachusetts Amherst), where he won the Clark Gold Medal and Grinnell Gold Medal for academic excellence. He also earned a certificate from Harvard University’s summer chemistry school before returning to Japan in 1888. He later received a master’s degree in entomology from Cornell University in 1890.

== Career ==
Mishima entered government service with the government of Hokkaido and later worked for the Ministry of Agriculture and Commerce and the Ministry of Communications. He was elected to the House of Peers in 1897 as a viscount member and joined the Kenkyūkai faction.

From 1911 to 1913 he served as president of the Yokohama Specie Bank, overseeing the opening of branches in Calcutta, Harbin, and San Francisco, and helped establish the Franco-Japanese Bank.

On 28 February 1913, Mishima became the eighth Governor of the Bank of Japan, serving until his death in 1919. As governor he pursued monetary restraint and price-stability policies during and after World War I. He encouraged the government to use fiscal surpluses to purchase foreign currency for Bank of Japan reserves and helped establish Japan’s first inter-bank agreement on deposit interest rates.

Mishima died suddenly in office on 7 March 1919, at the age of 51. He was buried in Aoyama Cemetery in Tokyo.

== Personal life ==
In 1893 Mishima briefly married Ōyama Nobuko, eldest daughter of Field Marshal Ōyama Iwao. She contracted tuberculosis soon after marriage and was divorced in 1895. Their relationship inspired Kenjirō Tokutomi’s 1899 novel Hototogisu (The Cuckoo). He later married Shijō Kaneko, daughter of Marquis Shijō Takataka.

According to family records, Mishima kept a small leather notebook containing a photograph of his first wife until his death.

== Legacy ==
Mishima’s life bridged Japan’s Meiji and Taishō eras of financial modernization. His governorship spanned the country’s transition through the First World War and laid groundwork for inter-bank coordination and overseas finance.

== Honors ==
- 20 June 1902 – Senior Fourth Rank (従四位)
- 1 April 1906 – Fourth Class, Order of the Rising Sun (旭日小綬章)
- 1 July 1910 – Junior Third Rank (正三位)
- 10 November 1915 – Third Class, Order of the Rising Sun (旭日中綬章)
- 1 April 1916 – Second Class, Order of the Rising Sun (旭日重光章)
- 11 February 1919 – Gold Cup award (金杯一個)
- 7 March 1919 – Senior Third Rank; First Class, Grand Cordon of the Order of the Rising Sun (勲一等旭日大綬章)

== See also ==
- Mishima Michiharu

== Notes ==
Government offices
Preceded by Korekiyo Takahashi	Governor of the Bank of Japan; 1913–1919	Succeeded by Junnosuke Inoue
