= Hoko system =

The Hoko system (Japanese: 保甲制度/ほこうせいど, Hepburn: Hokō sēdo) describes an institution of administrative control, adopted by the Japanese colonial government between 1898 and 1945 in Taiwan. The model was based on placing responsibility on every level of the community hierarchy. The system was an effective mechanism in producing domestic stability and social order for the Japanese government.

== Background ==
=== Baojia ===
Baojia (Wade-Giles: pao-chia) was a system of administrative control derived from the Qing regime, which extended to Taiwan in 1733. The institution was created in the context of frequent rebellions in the mid-nineteenth century rebellions and its purpose was to maintain local stability. The baojia would effectively internally police through group responsibility. The system monitored the rural community at three levels; the pai, jia and bao, referring to the 10 household unit, the 100 household unit and the 1000 household unit respectively. However, as a whole, this precursory method of social control to the Hoko system was seen as a failure. Hsiao Kung-chuan points towards the practical difficulties of properly implementing the system but more significantly notes "the pao-chia proved an effective deterrent only in times of relative tranquility." In fact since the Qing government extended the system to Taiwan, baojia was never universally applied and lacked proper supervision. Overall Qing rule (1683-1895) in Taiwan with the baojia in place since 1733, saw up to 40 acts of rebellion on the island.

=== Adoption ===
The baojia system was reinvigorated under Japanese colonial rule of Taiwan as a means to cope with local dissent and resistance to Japanese rule. In an effort to defend against Taiwanese guerrillas, village militia corps with the supervision of Japanese policemen was formed. Goto Shinpei an advocate for the use of local customs in ruling Japan's colonies saw the potential for the baojia system to be an "effective tool for social control." In 1898 Governor-General Kodama Gentaro passed the ‘Hoko Law’ and also the accompanying implementation legislation, ‘Regulations Governing the Execution of the Hoko Law’. Although adoption was not mandated, it was generally received positively and by 1902 the Hoko system was practically universal applied in Taiwan with the exception of Japanese nationals, colonial government officials, aborigines and other minorities who were exempt from the system.

=== Structure ===
The conception of the Hoko system was two pronged; 10 households formed one ko and 10 ko formed one ho. However, in fact the number of households pertaining to each unit varied depending on the size of the community. Every ho and ko unit were represented by an elected headmen. Every household was represented by a household head.

== Operation ==
Each headmen were responsible for ensuring that their unit obliged to the rules of the Hoko system. Whilst the rules were left to the discretion of each district, regulation generally encompassed administrative duties such as household surveys, rehabilitation of opium smokers and collection of taxes and issuing of fines to surveillance duties such as the reporting of suspicious looking outsiders, discovery of criminals and contagious individuals. The communities were closely monitored with household heads having to report any change in the residence of his home including over night visitors. Deviation or failure in following rules would bring about punishment for the entire unit. The conviction of a felon in ko would incur a ‘negligence’ fine on all household heads for failing to report the suspect. This was aimed to produce a sense of collective responsibility. Goto Shimpei believed that collective responsibility was an effective method of social control because it was based on the "solid ground of obligations, kinship relations, and tradition."

== Enforcement ==
To ensure awareness of the hoko code, household heads were charged with reciting the rules at household meetings. All households registered their security numbers with the police and hung a placard on their door stating key information on the household's occupants. Changes in the household composition would be orally reported to the head of the ho unit. who were entrusted with a household registrar. The ho headmen would send monthly written reports to their ko headmen stating changes in the population, observations of the local people and any unusual events which may have taken place during the month. The ko headmen would report the findings on his unit the police officer in residence twice a year.

=== Policemen ===
Hoko headmen were directly under the instruction of an allocated policeman that were often stationed next to or attached to the hoko office. The policemen were in charge of general surveillance of all hoko functions but also had the ability to punish hoko headmen for failing to perform their duties by either a fine, dismissal or reprimand.

=== Militia Corp ===
Hoko headmen would select able-bodied males between the age of 17 and 40 to join the militia corp consisting of members from other ko units in the same locality. Corp members served a three-year term and could not resign at will. Members were not paid, but provided food while on duty. The militia corp was under the instruction of the policemen and was used to in the event of a natural disaster or robbery. However, they were also often used to supplement police power in suppressing Japanese resistance. The Japanese government often called for an increase in militia units during times of national instability. During the period of World War II militia units grew from 981 in 1935 to 62,605 by the end of the war in 1942. Goto Shinpei pointed out the militia corps’ role was to "give military aid to the regular police forces and serve as a subordinate body for all kinds of police business."

== End of the Hoko System ==
The Hoko system faced the risk of overhaul in the 1920s where its rules of collective responsibility were seen as archaic in a time of increasing individualism. Critics of the system deemed it racially discriminatory considering it was only enforced on Taiwanese nationals, who also had to pay the corresponding hoko fees in addition to their normal taxes. This manifested itself in a petition, led by Yang Chi Chen for the hoko system's abolition being presented the Japan's 44th Diet in August 1921. Ultimately, the hoko system was not abolished until June 1945, shortly before Japan's surrender in World War II.
