= Takio Izawa =

Japanese politician

- 伊沢 多喜男
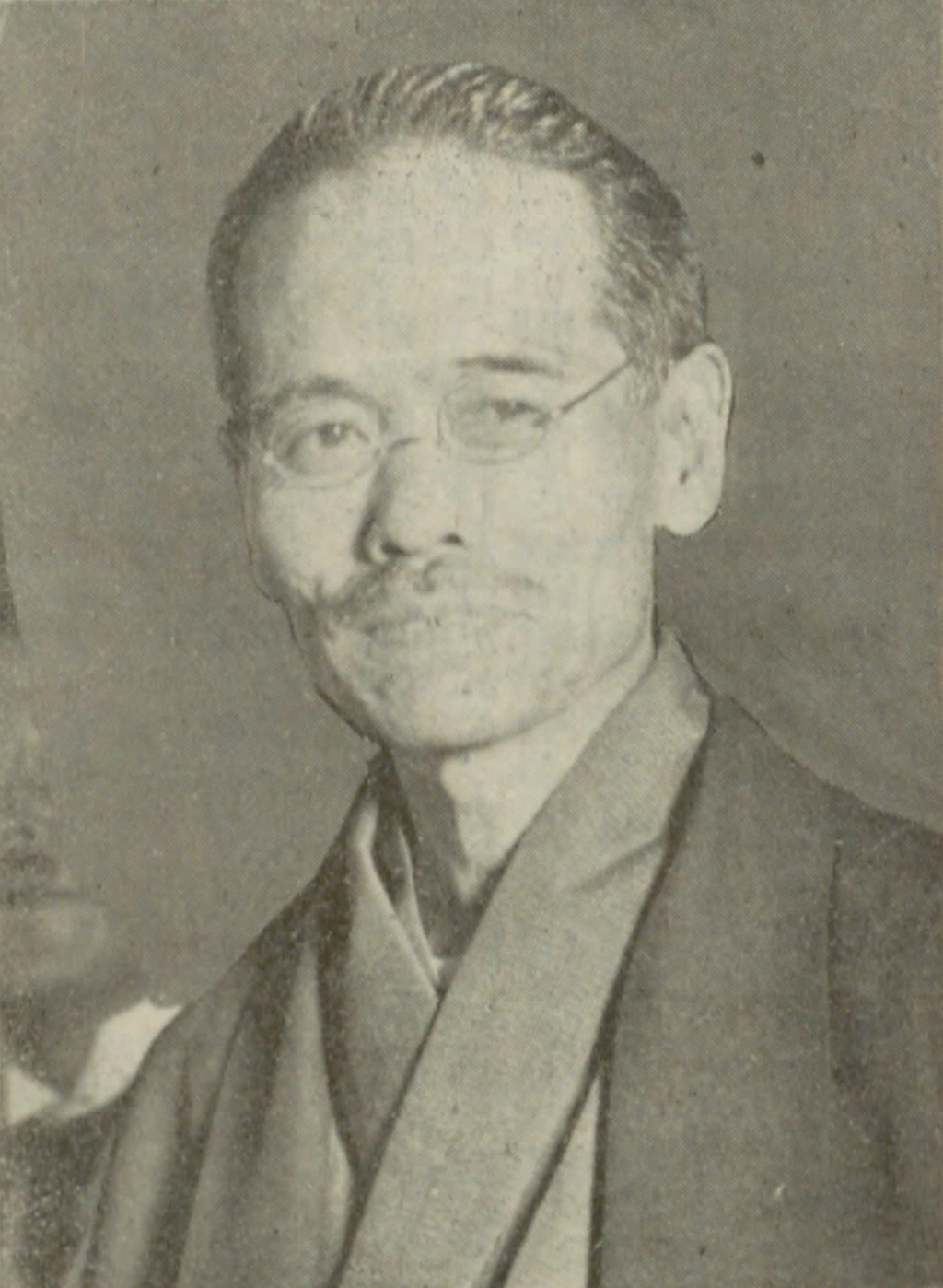

10th Governor-General of Taiwan
- In office 1 September 1924 – 16 July 1926
- Monarch: Taishō
- Preceded by: Uchida Kakichi
- Succeeded by: Kamiyama Mitsunoshin

Member of the Privy Council
- In office 26 December 1940 – 2 May 1947
- Monarch: Hirohito

Member of the House of Peers
- In office 5 October 1916 – 7 January 1941 Nominated by the Emperor

Mayor of Tokyo
- In office 16 July 1926 – 23 October 1926
- Preceded by: Nakamura Yoshikoto
- Succeeded by: Nishikubo Hiromichi
Gubernatorial offices
Governor of Niigata Prefecture
In office 30 December 1912 – 3 March 1913
Monarch	Taishō
Preceded by	Mori Masataka
Succeeded by	Andō Kensuke
Governor of Ehime Prefecture
In office 30 July 1909 – 30 December 1912
Monarchs	Meiji; Taishō
Preceded by	Andō Kensuke
Succeeded by	Rentarō Fukamachi
Governor of Wakayama Prefecture
In office 11 January 1907 – 30 July 1909
Monarch	Meiji
Preceded by	Kiyosu Ienori
Succeeded by	Kawakami Chikaharu

Personal details
- Born: 26 December 1869 Ina, Nagano, Japan
- Died: 13 August 1949 (aged 79) Toyama, Tokyo, Japan
- Resting place: Zōshigaya Cemetery
- Party: Independent
- Education: Tokyo Imperial University

Takio Izawa (伊澤 多喜男, Izawa Takio; 26 December 1869 – 13 August 1949) was a Japanese politician of the early 20th century.

== Biography ==
Izawa served as Governor of Wakayama, Ehime, and Niigata Prefectures on Honshū, and later became a member of the House of Peers.

He was appointed the 10th Governor-General of Taiwan where he served from 1 September 1924 to 16 July 1926.

After a trip to Japan for medical reasons in 1926, Izawa was nominated to become Mayor of Tokyo City, a position which he accepted.

== See also ==
- Taiwan under Japanese rule

Preceded by Uchida Kakichi	Governor-General of Taiwan; 1924–1926	Succeeded by Kamiyama Mitsunoshin
