= Nakamura Yoshikoto =

Japanese politician and entrepreneur (1867–1927)

- 中村 是公
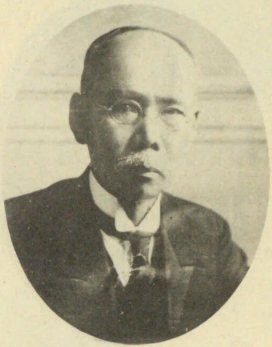

Mayor of Tokyo
- In office 8 October 1924 – 8 June 1926
- Preceded by: Hidejirō Nagata
- Succeeded by: Takio Izawa

Member of the House of Peers
- In office 16 May 1917 – 1 March 1927 Nominated by the Emperor

President of the Railway Bureau
- In office 23 April 1918 – 29 September 1918
- Preceded by: Gotō Shinpei
- Succeeded by: Tokonami Takejirō

President of the South Manchuria Railway
- In office 19 December 1908 – 18 December 1913
- Preceded by: Gotō Shinpei
- Succeeded by: Ryutaro Nomura

Personal details
- Born: 20 December 1867 Saeki, Aki, Japan
- Died: 1 March 1927 (aged 59) Shibuya, Tokyo, Japan
- Relatives: Akira Tomii (son-in-law)
- Education: Tokyo Imperial University

Nakamura Yoshikoto (中村 是公, , also Nakamura Korekimi; 20 December 1867 – 1 March 1927) was a government bureaucrat, entrepreneur, and politician in late Meiji period Japan. He served as second Chairman of the South Manchurian Railway Company, Mayor of Tokyo, Railroad Minister, and was a member of the House of Peers. He was also known as Nakamura Zekō.

== Biography ==
Nakamura was born in Aki Province, in what is now part of Saeki-ku, Hiroshima; however, as his father was a retainer of the Chōshū Domain, for political reasons Nakamura frequently claimed to be a native of Yamaguchi prefecture. He attended the First Tokyo Middle School (now Hibiya High School), where one of his classmates and close friends was the future author Natsume Sōseki. After graduating from the Law School of Tokyo Imperial University in 1893, Nakamura obtained a posting as a bureaucrat at the Ministry of Finance, and was sent to Akita Prefecture. He was later sent to work at the Japanese Governor-General of Taiwan, where he met his lifelong mentor, Gotō Shimpei.

After the Treaty of Portsmouth ended the Russo-Japanese War of 1904–1905, the Empire of Japan gained the former Russian territories of the Liaodong Peninsula in southern Manchuria, as well as the entire South Manchurian Railway. A new company was established to manage the railway and its extraterritorial properties (i.e. the South Manchurian Railway Zone), and Gotō Shimpei was recruited to head the new company due to his administrative experience and success in Taiwan. Despite Nakamura’s young age Gotō hand-picked him to be his assistant. In 1908, when Gotō was selected to become Minister of Communications, Nakamura succeeded him as Chairman of the South Manchurian Railway Company ("Mantetsu").

While Chairman, Nakamura continued to support Gotō politically as he went on to become Home Minister under the Yamamoto Gonnohyōe administration, and a leading figure of the Rikken Seiyūkai political party. Nakamura also maintained correspondence with his school friend Natsume Soseki, and invited him to tour Korea and Manchuria at Mantetsu expense in 1909 in exchange for publicity. An account of his travels was serialized by Asahi Newspaper as Manchuria and Korea, Here and There (満韓ところどころ, Mankan tokoro-dokoro).

In 1917, Nakamura was appointed to the House of Peers of the Imperial Diet, and subsequently became Railway Minister in the Terauchi cabinet. Nakamura became Mayor of Tokyo in 1924 and made strenuous efforts towards the rapid reconstruction of the Japanese capital city still devastated by the Great Kantō earthquake of 1923. He was forced out of office in 1926.

Nakamura died of a peptic ulcer in 1927 at the age of 61.
