= Zenjirō Horikiri =

Japanese official (1884–1979)

- 堀切 善次郎
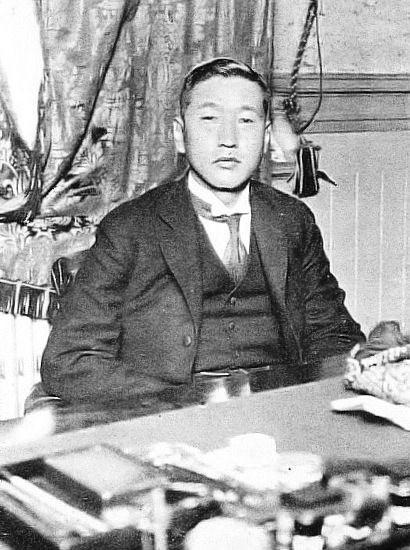
- Horikiri in 1929

Minister of Home Affairs
- In office 9 October 1945 – 13 January 1946
- Prime Minister: Kijūrō Shidehara
- Preceded by: Iwao Yamazaki
- Succeeded by: Chūzō Mitsuchi

Chief Cabinet Secretary
- In office 13 March 1933 – 8 July 1934
- Prime Minister: Saitō Makoto
- Preceded by: Shibata Zenzaburō
- Succeeded by: Isao Kawada

Director-General of the Legislative Bureau
- In office 26 May 1932 – 13 March 1933
- Prime Minister: Saitō Makoto
- Preceded by: Toshio Shimada
- Succeeded by: Teizō Kurosaki

Member of the House of Peers
- In office 5 December 1933 – 14 May 1946 Nominated by the Emperor

Mayor of Tokyo
- In office 24 April 1929 – 12 May 1930
- Preceded by: Otohiko Ichiki
- Succeeded by: Hidejirō Nagata

Governor of Kanagawa Prefecture
- In office 16 September 1925 – 28 September 1926
- Monarch: Taishō
- Preceded by: Seino Chōtarō
- Succeeded by: Hiroshi Ikeda

Personal details
- Born: 2 September 1884 Iizaka, Fukushima, Japan
- Died: 1 November 1979 (aged 95) Mejirodai, Tokyo, Japan
- Party: Independent
- Relatives: Zembei Horikiri (brother); Kyūgorō Uchiike (brother); Sakatani Yoshirō (father-in-law)
- Education: Tokyo Imperial University

Zenjirō Horikiri (堀切善次郎, Horikiri Zenjirō; 2 September 1884 – 1 November 1979) was a Japanese official who served as Minister for Home Affairs under Prime Minister Kijūrō Shidehara from 1945 to 1946. His brother, Zenbei Horikiri was also a politician and prominent member of the Rikken Seiyūkai political party.

== Biography ==
Horikiri was born in Fukushima Prefecture. After his graduation from Tokyo Imperial University, he entered the Home Ministry. As Director of the Censorship Department within the Home Ministry from 1917 to 1918, he ordered that publication of articles in newspapers concerning the Rice Riots of 1918 be banned, as they appear to be inciting violence. From 1925 to 1926, Horikiri was governor of Kanagawa Prefecture. The following year, he returned to the Home Ministry as Director of the Reconstruction Bureau, which was in charge of urban planning and the rebuilding of Tokyo in the aftermath of the Great Kantō earthquake. In 1929, Horikiri was appointed Mayor of Tokyo City, and at the end of 1930 was Vice Minister of Colonial Affairs.

In 1932, in the administration of Prime Minister Saitō Makoto, Horikiri served as Director-General of the Cabinet Legislation Bureau, and in 1933 was appointed Chief Cabinet Secretary. The same year, he was appointed to a seat in the upper house of the Diet of Japan.

Following the surrender of Japan, Horikiri was appointed Home Minister under the Shidehara administration. During his tenure, he sponsored election reform laws to lower the minimum voting age to twenty, and to enable were enacted on women’s suffrage and eligibility for seats on in the Diet. The laws were passed in the Diet in December 1945, despite reservations by some members that this action would lend support to extremist (particularly leftist) elements. As a result of the election law reforms, Koreans and Taiwanese resident in Japan lost their rights to vote in Japanese elections, as Horikiri judged that they had lost their Japanese nationality with Japan’s acceptance of the Potsdam Declaration, and would thenceforth need to be treated as resident foreigners.

At the end of his term of office, Horikiri was placed on purged list of those banned from holding government office.

Following the end of the occupation, Horikiri served from 1954 to 1969 as the Chairman of the Tokyo Metropolitan Public Safety Commission, which supervises the Tokyo Metropolitan Police Department.

== Notes ==
Political offices
Preceded by Shibata Zenaburó	Chief Cabinet Secretary; 13 March 1933 – 8 July 1934	Succeeded by Kawada Isao
Preceded by Iwao Yamazaki	Home Minister; 9 October 1945 – 13 Jan 1946	Succeeded by Chūzō Mitsuji
