= Kyushu Dental University =

Dental school in Fukuoka Prefecture, Japan

Coordinates: 33°52′21″N 130°51′15″E

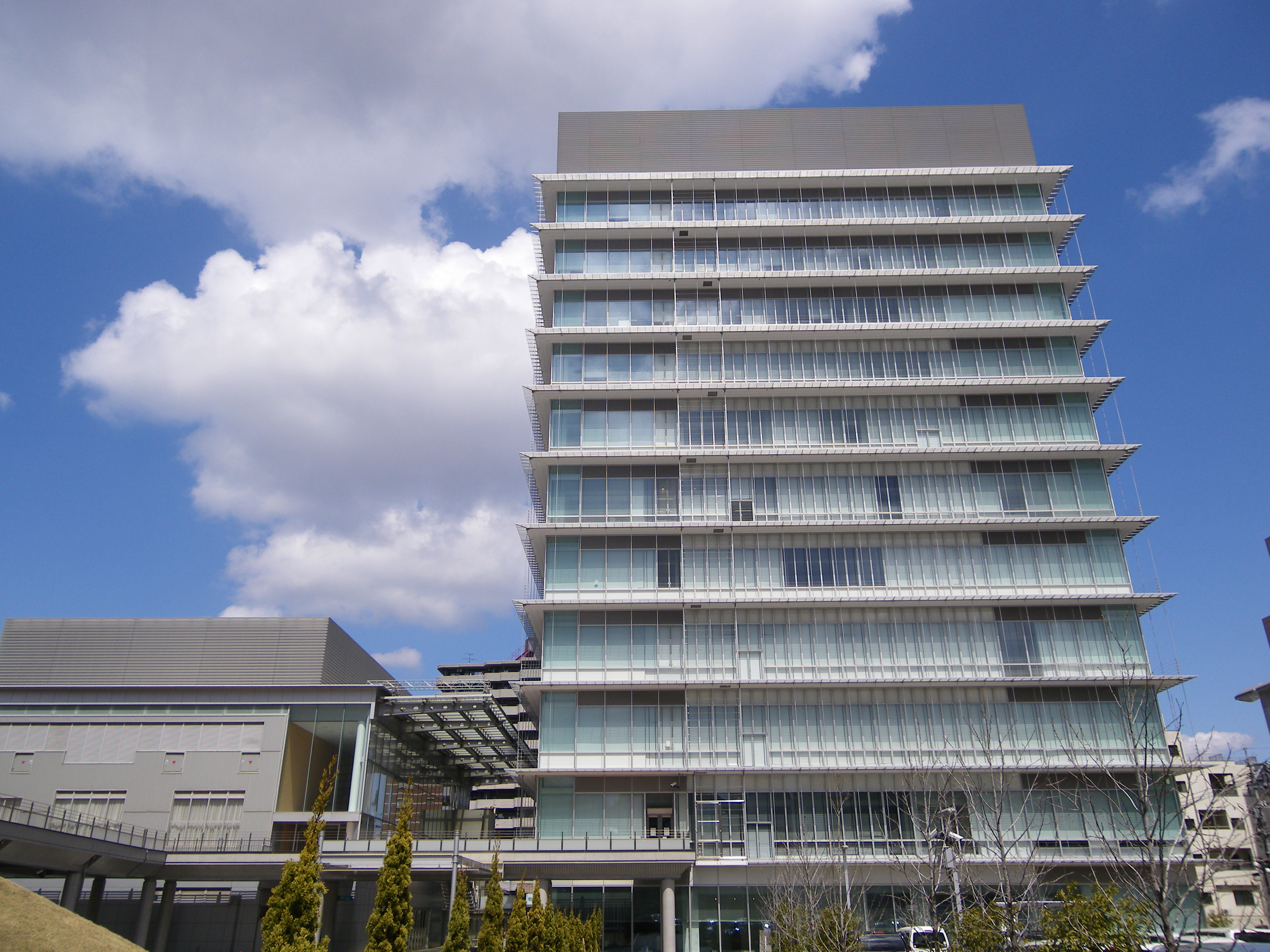
Kyushu dental college

Kyushu Dental University (九州歯科大学, Kyūshū shika daigaku) is a public university in Kitakyushu, Fukuoka, Japan. The predecessor of the school was founded in 1914, and it was chartered as a university in 1949.
