= Otohiko Ichiki =

- 市来 乙彦

10th Governor of the Bank of Japan
- In office 5 September 1923 – 9 May 1927
- Preceded by: Junnosuke Inoue
- Succeeded by: Junnosuke Inoue

Minister of Finance
- In office 12 June 1922 – 2 September 1923
- Prime Minister: Katō Tomosaburō
- Preceded by: Korekiyo Takahashi
- Succeeded by: Junnosuke Inoue

Member of the House of Councillors
- In office 3 May 1947 – 2 May 1950
- Preceded by: Constituency established
- Succeeded by: Multi-member district
- Constituency: National district

Member of the House of Peers
- In office 21 September 1918 – 2 May 1947 Nominated by the Emperor

Mayor of Tokyo
- In office 7 January 1928 – 14 February 1929
- Preceded by: Nishikubo Hiromichi
- Succeeded by: Zenjirō Horikiri

Personal details
- Born: 7 May 1872 Kagoshima City, Kagoshima, Japan
- Died: 19 February 1954 (aged 81) Chiba City, Chiba, Japan
- Party: Independent
- Education: First Higher School; Tokyo Imperial University

Otohiko Ichiki (市来 乙彦, Ichiki Otohiko; 7 May 1872 – 19 February 1954) was a Japanese bureaucrat, politician, and central banker. He served as the Minister of Finance, the 10th Governor of the Bank of Japan (BOJ), the Mayor of Tokyo City, and a member of the National Diet.

== Early life and education ==
Ichiki was born in Kagoshima City, Kagoshima Prefecture. He finished the local school, Middle School Zoshikan. He entered the Higher Middle School Zoshikan of Kagoshima too, but he dropped out for financial reason. He went to Tokyo in 1889 and stayed in Inajiro Tajiri's house as a live-in student (Mr.Tajiri was an economist and financial bureaucracy). Ichiki finished the First Higher Middle School where was Tokyo in 1893. He graduated from the College of Law, Imperial University and entered Japanese Ministry of Finance in 1896.

== Career ==
In 1922–1923, Ichiki was briefly finance minister in the cabinet of Katō Tomosaburō. As head of the Ministry of Finance, he was cautious in response to unsettled financial situation. Ichiki was Governor of the Bank of Japan from 5 September 1923, through 10 May 1927.

== Notes ==
Political offices
Preceded by Korekiyo Takahashi	Minister of Finance; 1922–1923	Succeeded by Junnosuke Inoue
Government offices
Preceded by Junnosuke Inoue (1st term)	Governor of the Bank of Japan; 1928–1935	Succeeded by Junnosuke Inoue (2nd term)
