= Motono Ichirō =

Japanese statesman and diplomat

- 本野 一郎
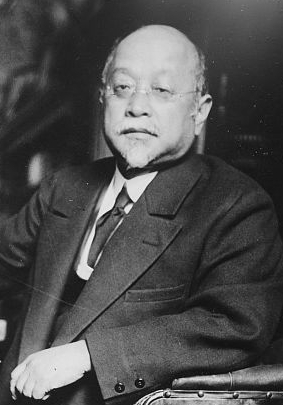
- Motono Ichirō

Minister for Foreign Affairs
- In office 21 November 1916 – 23 April 1918
- Prime Minister: Terauchi Masatake
- Preceded by: Terauchi Masatake
- Succeeded by: Gotō Shinpei

Personal details
- Born: 23 March 1862 Saga Domain, Japan
- Died: 17 September 1918 (aged 56) Tokyo, Japan
- Party: Independent
- Occupation: Diplomat, Cabinet Minister

Viscount Motono Ichirō (本野 一郎; March 23, 1862 – September 17, 1918) was a statesman and diplomat, active in Meiji period Japan.

== Biography ==
Motono was born in Saga, Hizen Province, (modern-day Saga Prefecture). His father, an entrepreneur, was one of the founders of the modern Yomiuri Shimbun. Motono studied law in France, and in 1896 translated the civil code of the Empire of Japan into French . He served as Minister Plenipotentiary to the Kingdom of Belgium in 1898–1901, and in that capacity represented the Empire of Japan at the 1899 Hague Peace Conference. In 1905 he served as a judge at the Permanent Court of Arbitration, and formed a dissential opinion in the case of the Japanese Tax House . He served as the Japanese Ambassador to the Empire of Russia from 1906 to 1916.

On June 14, 1907, he was granted the title of baron (danshaku) under the kazoku peerage system for his services, and was also awarded the Order of the Rising Sun, 1st class. His title was elevated to that of viscount (shishaku) on July 14, 1916. Under the cabinet of Terauchi Masatake, he served as foreign minister of Japan between October 9, 1916 and his resignation on April 23, 1918. He was noted for his harsh stance against the Russian Revolution and his support of the Siberian Intervention. He died on September 17, 1918, and was awarded the Order of the Chrysanthemum.

Political offices
| Preceded by Terauchi Masatake | Minister for Foreign Affairs; 1916–1918 | Succeeded by Gotō Shinpei |
