= Baojia system =

System of social organization

The baojia system (Chinese: 保甲; pinyin: bǎojiǎ; Wade–Giles: pao^{3}-chia^{3}) was an invention of Wang Anshi of the Northern Song dynasty, who created this community-based system of law enforcement and civil control that was included in his large reform of Chinese government ("the New Policies") from 1069–1076.

== History ==
=== Imperial China ===
The leaders of the baos were given authority to maintain local order, collect taxes, and organize civil projects. The idea of the system was that it would diminish the government's reliance on mercenaries, and that it would instead assign responsibility of law enforcement to these civil societies. Baojia regulations were issued centrally in 1548, during the Ming dynasty, but the system was not mandatory. Rather, the regulations were more like guidelines for officials who wished to deploy the system in their counties.

During Ming dynasty, there was also lijia system to gather taxes, which coincided with baojia.

During the Qing dynasty, the baojia system was expanded across all of China. However, Ju Dongzu has written that the system was "on the whole ineffective" during this time, and "remained a formality" for several centuries after its introduction.

Being primarily the system of self-defense, in 1885, baojia was extended to cover tax collection. This resulted in power abuses and local unrest.

=== Modern China ===
The baojia system has continued to resonate with Chinese citizens during the 20th century. During the boycott of Japanese products that occurred during the May Fourth Movement in 1919, students modeled their resistance on the baojia system. Ten people swore a collective oath to boycott Japanese products, and to make sure that the other nine members of their group upheld their oath. Each member of the group was to attempt to convert nine outsiders to the cause, forming ten groups of ten, which could come together as a group of one hundred. Finally, ten groups of one hundred could meet to form a one thousand person brigade. As with the traditional baojia system, one member of each group of ten became leader of the group. Although no functional group of one thousand ever existed, there is evidence that the ten person groups played an important role in carrying out the boycott.

During the later Republic of China era, Chiang Kai-shek pressed for the reintroduction of the baojia system. He Yingqin argued that the baojia system could be used as the basis for the switch from a mercenary to a compulsory military service. The system had some success, but there was great difficulty in finding qualified and willing baozhang, as the position was unpaid.

The Japanese also revived the baojia (in Japanese, Tonarigumi) system in Manchukuo on December 22, 1933. In this case, the system's primary purpose was to monitor and control the Chinese citizens. The government instituted a lianzuo punishment system, in which crimes committed by one family in a pai would result in punishment for all ten families in that pai. This gave the paizhang a large incentives to monitor the other families in his pai. The Tonarigumi system was also a self-defense unit and an operational mutual responsibility and surveillance organization. This system lasted until 1937, when the all-out war being waged in East Asia forced the Japanese government to consider more direct and centralized control schemes. On December 1, 1937, a new district and village government system was announced.

=== Taiwan under Japanese rule ===
In Taiwan under Japanese rule, the baojia system inherited from the Qing government was adapted into the Hoko system. The system was an effective mechanism in producing domestic stability and social order for the Japanese government.

== Structure ==
The structure of the baojia system changed over time. In Wang Anshi's original system, its basic unit was the bao (watch), which consisted of ten families. However, during the Ming dynasty, this ten family unit was instead labeled a jia (tithing), and ten jia (or one hundred families) made a bao. Each jia possessed a placard that rotated among the families. The family holding it at a given time was the jiazhang, or tithing captain. Similarly, the captain of the bao was the baozhang.

There was a great deal of regional variation in the system. In some areas, jia had as few as four families or as many as thirteen. Some Jiangnan counties added an intermediary unit called the dang (compact). This unit consisted of thirty families and had a corresponding dangzhang.

During the Qing dynasty, the system's structure changed again. Ten households made up one pai, ten pai constituted one jia, and every ten jia formed a bao. Studies by Philip Huang and Wang Fuming of Baodi County in northeastern Hebei province (now Baodi District, Tianjin) have shown that the lowest quasi-official was the xiangbao, who oversaw about twenty villages and was intended to act as a buffer between the people and the government.

When the system was reimplemented in the Republic of China, the structure remained essentially the same, with the exception of the introduction of the lianbao (associated bao), a group of several bao at the district level.
