= Eigo Fukai =

Japanese businessman

- 深井 英五
- Eigo Fukai

13th Governor of the Bank of Japan
- In office 4 June 1935 – 9 February 1937
- Prime Minister: Keisuke Okada; Koki Hirota; Senjuro Hayashi
- Preceded by: Hisaakira Hijikata
- Succeeded by: Shigeaki Ikeda

Personal details
- Born: December 31, 1871 Takasaki, Gunma, Japan
- Died: October 21, 1945 (aged 73)

Eigo Fukai (深井 英五, Fukai Eigo; December 31, 1871 – October 21, 1945) was a Japanese businessman, central banker and the 13th Governor of the Bank of Japan (BOJ).

== Early life ==
Fukai was born in Gumma Prefecture.

== Career ==
Fukai was the aide to Takahashi Korekiyo, who was responsible for negotiating war loans to pay for Japan's participation in the Russo-Japanese War.

Fukui was part of the Japanese delegation at the Versailles Peace Conference in 1919. He was a special appointee of the Foreign Office at the Washington Conference on Limitation of Armament in 1921. Fukui was also a Japanese delegate at the London Economic Conference in 1933.

Fukai was Governor of the Bank of Japan from June 4, 1935 – February 9, 1937. His promotion came after seven years as Deputy Governor.

During his term as head of the bank, his chief concern was ensuring confidence in Japan's currency and limiting monetary inflation. Ineffective efforts to slow the growth of military spending marked Fukai's term as BOJ governor.

== Notes ==
Government offices
Preceded by Hisaakira Hijikata	Governor of the Bank of Japan; 1935–1937	Succeeded by Shigeaki Ikeda
