= Hirai Seijirō =

Japanese railroad engineer (1856–1926)

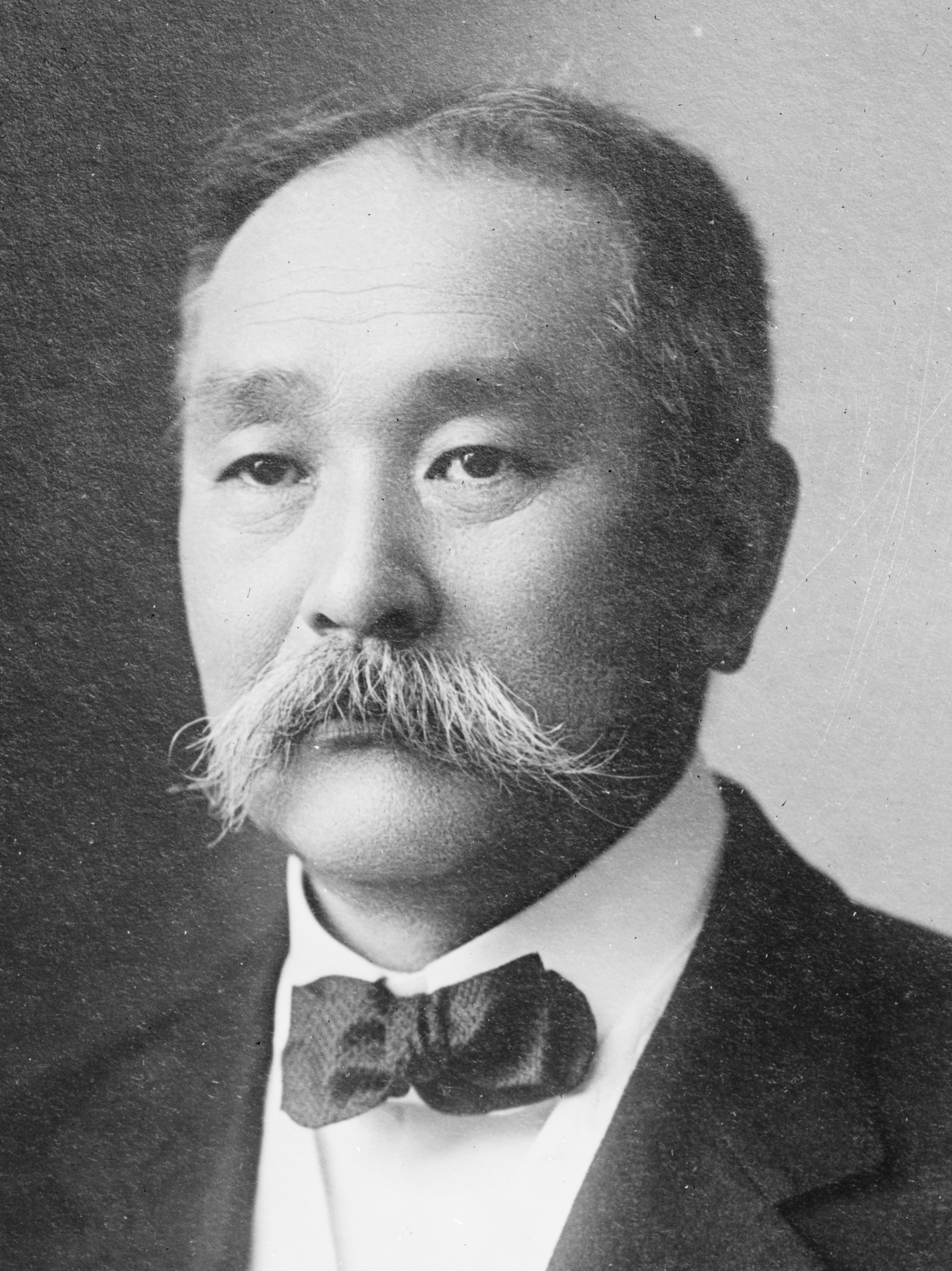
Hirai Seijirō

Hirai Seijirō (平井 晴二郎; November 13, 1856 – June 28, 1926) was a Japanese railroad engineer.

== Biography ==
Hirai was born in Kanazawa, Japan. He was chosen by Japan to be one of the first to study abroad and he attended Rensselaer Polytechnic Institute where he was a member of the Delta Kappa Epsilon fraternity. He received his M.S. in civil engineering in 1878. He worked for the U.S. government before becoming a railway engineer in the Colonization Bureau for Hokkaidō in 1881. In 1882 he was appointed chief of the railway for the Mining and Railway Bureau for Hokkaidō. He later became the chief engineer of the Osaka Railway Company.

He eventually joined the government of Japan, where he was advanced to the position of president of the Imperial Government Railways in 1904. When the railway became presided by a cabinet minister (Gotō Shinpei being the first minister) in 1908, he was appointed the vice president.

On December 23, 1908, he became a member of the House of Peers as nominated by Emperor Meiji. He was in the office until his death.

In 1913 he was dispatched to China and served as an adviser to the Chinese government until he returned to Japan in 1925.

There is a dormitory named after him at Rensselaer.
