= Third Higher School =

The Third Higher School (第三高等学校, Daisan Kōtō Gakkō) was a university preparatory boy's boarding school (higher school) in Kyoto, Japan. It is the direct predecessor of the Faculty of Integrated Human Studies of Kyoto University.

== History ==
The Third Higher School traced its roots to the Chemistry School (舎密局, Seimi-kyoku), an institution for Chemistry and Physics founded in Osaka in 1869. Seimi is a Japanese transcription of the Dutch word chemie, meaning chemistry. In 1894, this institution evolved into the Third Higher School, which was then a specialised boarding school, roughly equivalent to an American college with departments of law, engineering, and medicine. Back then, the country had only one university, the University of Tokyo, and the call for the nation's second university in the Kansai region was gaining momentum. However, due to financial reasons, the government was reluctant to do so.

The situation changed when the aristocratic politician Saionji Kinmochi, who was from a prominent kuge family in Kyoto, suggested the founding of the nation's second university using war reparations from the First Sino-Japanese War. This plan was edicted accordingly in 1896, and Kyoto Imperial University (Kyoto University) was established on 18 June 1897, as the second university in the country. Following the establishment of the university, the school became a university preparatory school just like its counterpart in Tokyo, the First Higher School.

In 1949, along with other higher schools in Japan, the school was merged into Kyoto University as part of the post-war educational reform.

== Notable alumni ==
=== Academics ===
- Hideki Yukawa, went on to study at Kyoto University, became a physicist and awarded Nobel Prize in Physics in 1949
- Shin'ichirō Tomonaga, went on to study at Kyoto University, became a physicist and awarded Nobel Prize in Physics in 1965
- Leo Esaki, went on to study at the University of Tokyo, became an engineer and awarded Nobel Prize in Physics in 1973
- Teiji Takagi, went on to study at the University of Tokyo, became a mathematician specialised in algebraic number theory
- Kiyoshi Oka, went on to study at Kyoto University, became a mathematician specialised in the theory of functions of several complex variables
- Shigeaki Hinohara, went on to study at Kyoto University, became a doctor who promoted the practice of annual medical checkups

=== Politicians ===
- Osachi Hamaguchi, went on to study at the University of Tokyo, served as the prime minister of Japan
- Kijuro Shidehara, went on to study at the University of Tokyo, served as the prime minister of Japan
- Tetsu Katayama, went on to study at the University of Tokyo, served as the prime minister of Japan

== Sources ==
- Furter, W.F.; American Chemical Society (1982). A Century of Chemical Engineering. Springer US. ISBN 978-0-306-40895-3.
