= Ryutaro Nomura =

Japanese businessman

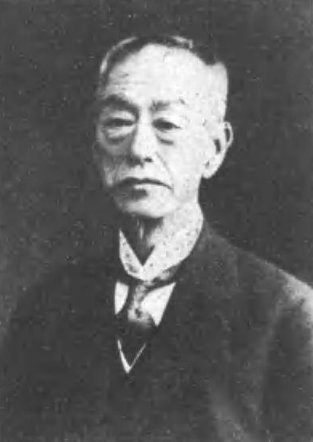
Ryutaro Nomura

Ryutaro Nomura (Japanese: 野村龍太郎) (February 27, 1859 – September 18, 1943) was a Japanese businessman. He was born in Gifu Prefecture. He was a graduate of the University of Tokyo. He was twice President of the South Manchuria Railway (1913–1914, 1919–1921). He was a recipient of the Order of the Sacred Treasure and the Order of the Rising Sun.

Preceded by Yoshikoto Nakamura	President of the South Manchuria Railway; 1913–1914	Succeeded by Yujiro Nakamura
Preceded by Shimbei Kunisawa	President of the South Manchuria Railway; 1919–1921	Succeeded by Senkichiro Hayakawa
