= Ministry of Railways (Japan) =

Former Japanese railway system operator

Japanese Government Railways Ministry of Railways 鉄道省 Tetsudō-shō

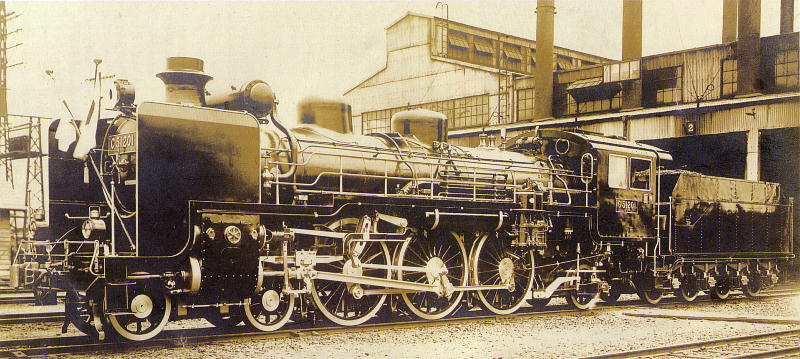
- JNR Class C51 locomotive decorated to haul the imperial train, 1940

Overview
- Headquarters: Tokyo
- Locale: Japan, nationwide
- Dates of operation: 1871–1949
- Successor: Japanese National Railways

Technical
- Track gauge: 3 ft 6 in (1,067 mm)
- Length: 18,400 km (1941)

The Japanese Government Railways (JGR) was the national railway system directly operated by the Japanese Ministry of Railways (鉄道省, Tetsudō-shō; Japanese pronunciation: [te̞t͡sɨᵝdo̞ːɕo̞ː]) until 1949. It was a predecessor of Japanese National Railways and the later Japan Railways Group.

== Name ==
The English name "Japanese Government Railways" was what the Ministry of Railways (established in 1920) used to call its own "Ministry Lines" (省線, shōsen) and sometimes the ministry itself as a railway operator. Other English names for the government railways include Imperial Japanese Government Railways and Imperial Government Railways, which were mainly used prior to the establishment of the ministry. This article covers the railways operated by the central government of Japan from 1872 to 1949 notwithstanding the official English name of the system of each era.

== Network ==
By the end of World War II in 1945, the Japanese Government Railways operated on the main Japanese islands of Honshū, Hokkaidō, Kyūshū, Shikoku and Karafuto. The railways in Taiwan and Korea were operated by the local Governor-General Offices - the Taiwan Government-General Railway and the Chosen Government Railway respectively - and were not part of JGR.

Total operating distance of JGR as of March 31 of each year
Year	mi	km
1881	76.3131	122.8140
1891	551.22	887.10
1901	822.49	1,323.67
1906-07: railway nationalization
1911	4,870.6	7,838.5
1921	6,484.7	10,436.1
1931	9,056.4	14,574.9
1941	11,433.2	18,400.0

While the JGR was the only major operator of intercity railways after the railways were nationalized in 1906–1907, privately owned regional railways were also active.

The gauge used for Japanese railways was 1,067 mm (3 ft 6 in) (narrow gauge) other than some minor exceptions (184.2 km (114.5 mi) total in the peak years of 1936-38) of 762 mm (2 ft 6 in) gauge lines being used.

== History ==
Symbol mark of the Government Railways ("工" is the kanji initial of the Ministry of Industry. It also resembles the cross-section of a rail.)

The first railway in Japan was operated by the imperial government in 1872. The idea of centralization of the railway was promoted under the idea of "breaking down of the geographical barriers that existed in the feudal communities which hindered the centralization of authority". Placing the railways under government control was for military and political ends; the government had no intention for the central railway to be operated as a "model enterprise". Early shareholders of the railway were members of the nobility, holding "the major portion of (the) capital". The governmental system was largely expanded by the promulgation of the Railway Nationalization Act in 1906. In 1920, the Ministry of Railways was established.

In 1949, JGR was reorganized to become a state-owned public corporation named the Japanese National Railways.

=== Timeline ===
- June 12, 1872 - Provisional opening of Tokyo-Yokohama railway (Shinagawa Station - Yokohama Station)
- October 14, 1872 - Formal opening of Tokyo-Yokohama railway (ceremony at Shimbashi and Yokohama Stations)
- October 1, 1907 - Completion of nationalization of 17 private railways under 1906 Railway Nationalization Act
- December 20, 1914 - Opening of Tokyo Station
- November 1, 1925 - Inauguration of the Yamanote Loop Line
- April 1, 1943 - Inclusion of Karafuto prefectural lines into national system
- February 1, 1946 - Official exclusion of Soviet-occupied Karafuto lines from national system
- June 1, 1949 - Establishment of Japanese National Railways, i.e. end of Japanese Government Railways
- April 1, 1987 - Privatization of JNR, establishment of seven JR companies

=== Historical operators of JGR ===
Before the establishment of the Japanese National Railways as a public corporation on June 1, 1949, the Japanese Government Railways were operated by the governmental agencies. The table below shows the historical operators of the JGR. Translated names of ministries may not be official. Names of the operating department generally mean "department (or office, section, agency) of railways" or like.

Date of establishment	Ministry	Department	Note
1870-04-19	Civil and Finance Ministry (民部大蔵省, Minbu-Ōkura-shō)	Tetsudō-gakari (鉄道掛)	in charge of construction only
1870-08-06	Civil Ministry (民部省, Minbu-shō)	Tetsudō-gakari (鉄道掛)	in charge of construction only
1870-12-12	Ministry of Industry (工部省, Kōbu-shō)	Tetsudō-gakari (鉄道掛)	in charge of construction only
1871-09-28	Ministry of Industry (工部省, Kōbu-shō)	Tetsudō-ryō (鉄道寮)	First railway opened in 1872.
1877-01-11	Ministry of Industry (工部省, Kōbu-shō)	Tetsudō-kyoku (鉄道局)	
1885-12-22	Cabinet (内閣, Naikaku)	Tetsudō-kyoku (鉄道局)	
1890-09-06	Home Ministry (内務省, Naimu-shō)	Tetsudō-chō (鉄道庁)	
1892-07-21	Ministry of Communications (逓信省, Teishin-shō)	Tetsudō-chō (鉄道庁)	
1893-11-10	Ministry of Communications (逓信省, Teishin-shō)	Tetsudō-kyoku (鉄道局)	
1897-08-18	Ministry of Communications (逓信省, Teishin-shō)	Tetsudō-sagyō-kyoku (鉄道作業局)	Tetsudō-kyoku survived as an administrative body for private railways till 1908.
1907-04-01	Ministry of Communications (逓信省, Teishin-shō)	Teikoku-Tetsudō-chō (帝国鉄道庁)	Tetsudō-kyoku survived as an administrative body for private railways till 1908.
1908-12-05	Cabinet	Tetsudō-in (鉄道院)	Government Railways were commonly called In-sen (院線).
1920-05-15	Ministry of Railways (鉄道省, Tetsudō-shō)		Government Railways were commonly called Shō-sen (省線).
1943-11-01	Ministry of Transport and Communications (運輸通信省, Un'yu-Tsūshin-shō)	Tetsudō-sōkyoku (鉄道総局)	Government Railways were commonly called Shō-sen (省線).
1945-05-19	Ministry of Transport (運輸省, Un'yu-shō)	Tetsudō-sōkyoku (鉄道総局)	Government Railways were commonly called Shō-sen (省線).

== Fare system ==
Since opening in 1872, the railway set fares for passengers in three classes. The transportation of freight was charged based on weight and class of goods. In 1872, passengers could choose from Upper, Middle and Lower classes, which were later renamed as First, Second and Third classes. Freight was shipped using one of five rates based on 100 kin of product.

A 1923 review of the shipping tariffs further explained that goods are divided into three shipping classes (according to the ways in which they are to be handled by the railway): koguchi atsukai (goods in small lots), kashikini atsukai (goods for a reserved freight car) and tokushu atsukai (goods requiring special treatment). It was also possible to ship them via futsubin (regularly scheduled trains) and kyukobin (express trains). "It may, therefore, be fairly said that the freight rates of the State-owned railways in Japan are of absolute uniformity." As Japan is an island nation, it was noted that ocean-going vessels are a major source of competition for the freight business of the railway.

== Technical details ==
The railway invested heavily in methods to reduce coal consumption in steam locomotives; between 1920 and 1936, coal consumption per kilometer traveled was reduced by about a quarter.

The government mandated the use of automatic couplers on all cars on the system in July 1925. The system was transitioning from vacuum brakes to air brakes at this time, with most freight cars equipped with air brakes by April 1927.

== Tourism promotion ==
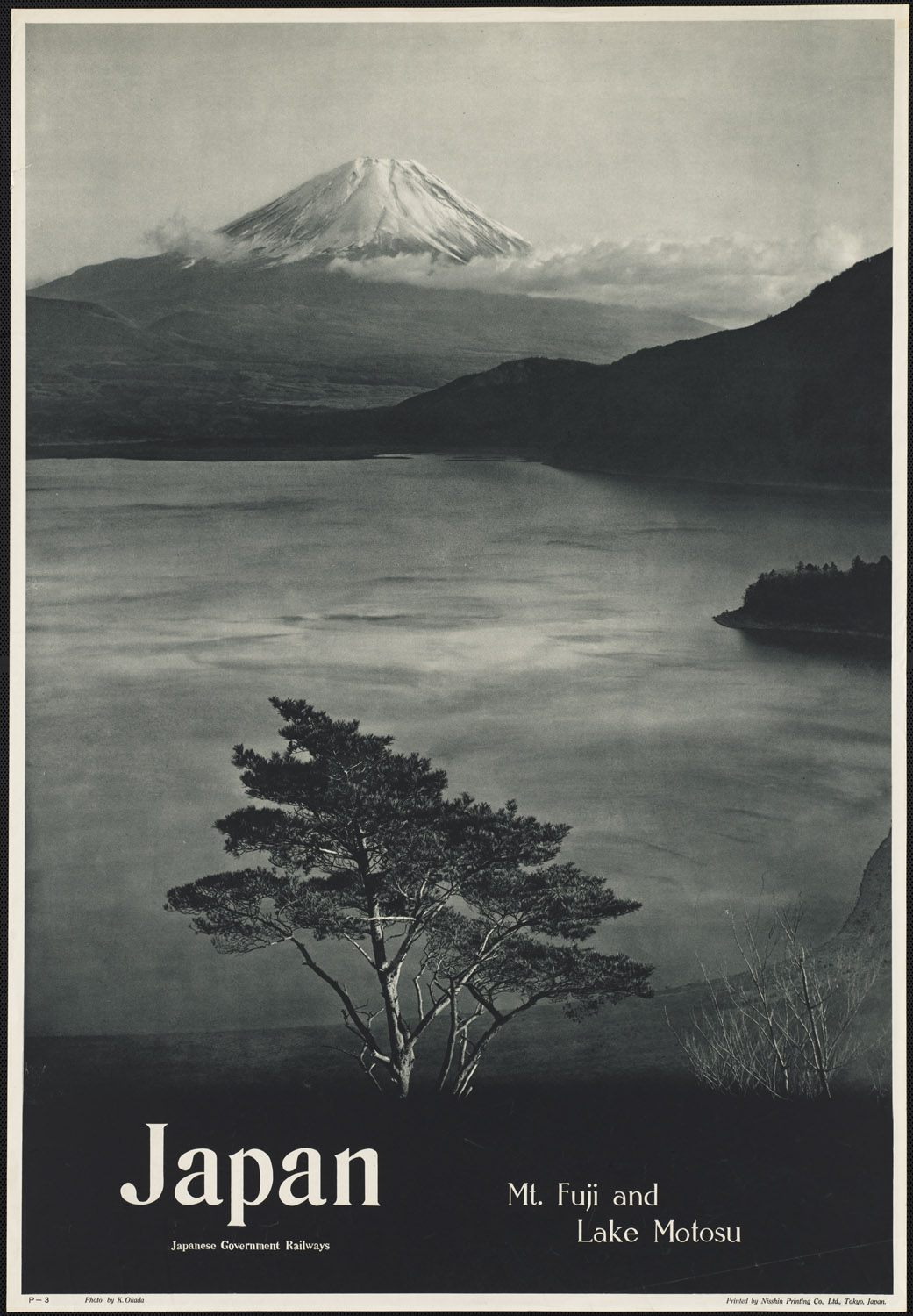
JGR poster for invitation of international tourists

One of the roles of the Japanese Government Railways was to attract foreign tourists to Japan. In 1930, the government created the Board of Tourist Industry (国際観光局, Kokusai Kankō Kyoku) as a section of the Japanese Government Railways (Ministry of Railways). The Board printed and distributed picture posters and English guidebooks overseas and encouraged development of resort hotels at home. The Board was dissolved in 1942, following the outbreak of the Pacific War in 1941.

== Notable people ==
- Inoue Masaru – Head of the government railways between 1871 and 1893
- Hirai Seijirō – Head of the government railways between 1904 and 1908
- Gotō Shinpei – Head of the government railways between 1908 and 1911
- Takejirō Tokonami – Head of government railways in 1920s and early 1930s
- Eisaku Satō (Prime Minister of Japan in 1960s) – served as a railway official between 1924 and 1948
- Hideo Shima – Chief Engineer of Shinkansen Project
- Sadanori Shimoyama
