= Toshio Iue =

Japanese industrialist (1902–1969)

- 井植 歳男
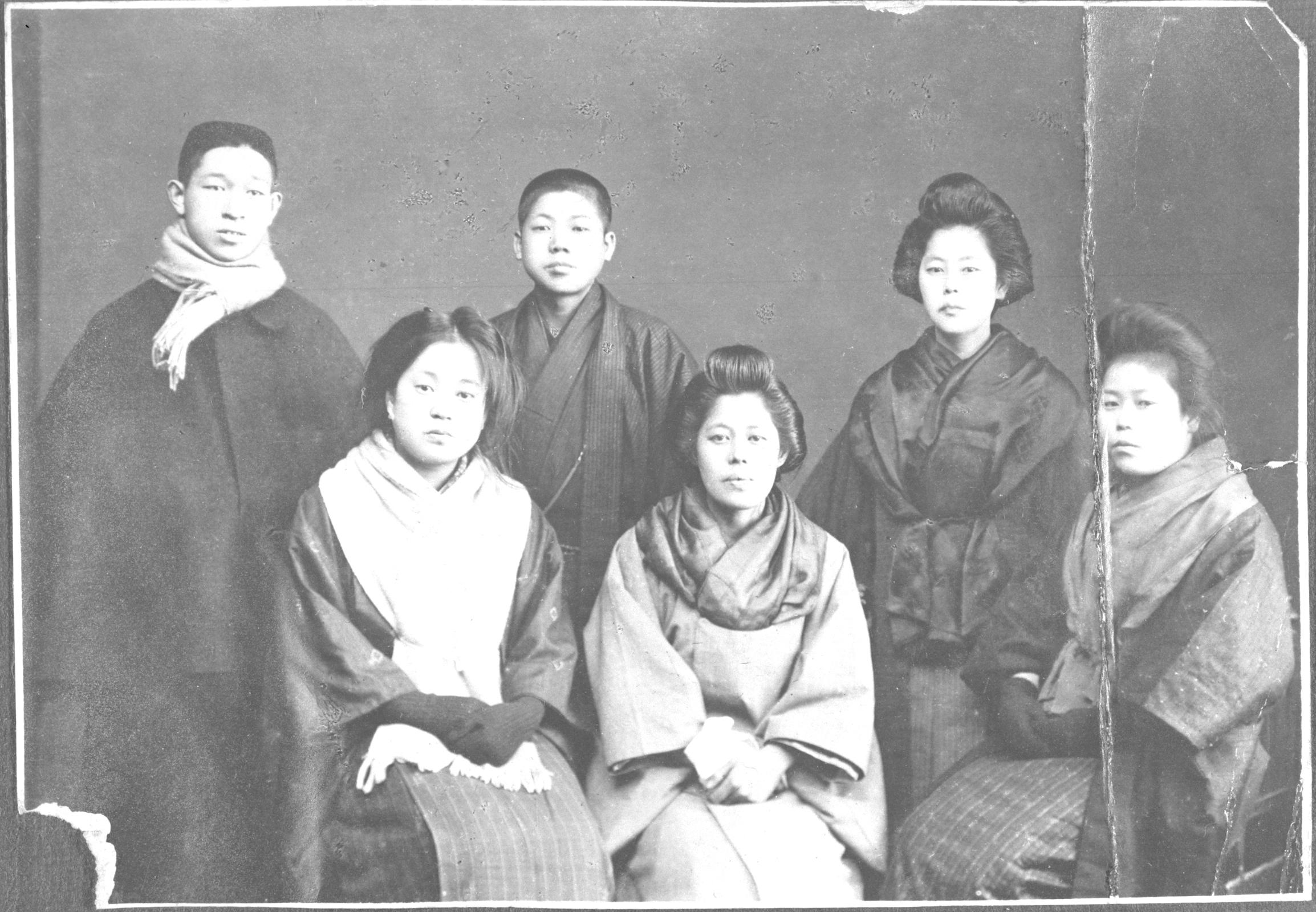
- The members of Matsushita Electric Housewares Manufacturing Works (back row from left, Kōnosuke Matsushita, Toshio Iue, Mumeno Matsushita)
- Born: 28 December 1902; Awaji, Hyōgo, Empire of Japan
- Died: 16 July 1969 (aged 66); Awaji, Hyōgo, Japan
- Occupations: Businessman and industrialist
- Known for: The founding of Sanyo
- Children: 2
- Relatives: Kōnosuke Matsushita (brother-in-law)

Japanese name
- Kanji: 井植 歳男
Transcriptions
- Romanization: Iue Toshio

Toshio Iue (井植 歳男, Iue Toshio; 28 December 1902 – 16 July 1969) was a Japanese inventor and industrialist who founded Sanyo Electric Co., Ltd. Prior to the founding of Sanyo, he played an influential role in the growth and development of Matsushita Electric Works, working closely alongside his brother-in-law and lifetime confidant, Konosuke Matsushita.

== Early life ==
The son of a sailor from Awaji Island, Iue initially followed his father's footsteps as a sailor's apprentice. When a ship he was on exploded, with Toshio barely escaping with his life, he took a job at an electric plant run by Konosuke Matsushita, who was married to one of Toshio's sisters. During his tenure at the company, he became an expert salesman, convincing wary resalers of the quality of Matsushita's electric products, which were from Osaka, in an era where most electric goods in Japan were made in Tokyo.

== Career at Matsushita ==
After serving in the Japanese military, Iue came back to Japan and became Konosuke's brother-in-law once again when he married Mumeno Matsushita. Iue then took the lead in building a wooden boat factory for Matsushita upon request of the Japanese military during World War II. Upon Japan's defeat in the war, the General Headquarters of Allied Forces requested a change in the management of Matsushita, with one of its senior executives required to step down. Iue decided to step down so that Matsushita could continue as the head of the company.

== Founding of Sanyo ==
After his resignation from Matsushita, Iue was summoned to the office of the president of Sumitomo Bank after an ill-timed loan to acquire shares in Matsushita, which had become close to worthless after Japan's defeat. The bank president forgave Iue's debt, and knowing his prior talent working at Matsushita, offered him starting capital for a new business.

Konosuke Matsushita would lend Iue an unused plant in Hyogo Prefecture, where he followed in his brother-in-law's footsteps by initially making bicycle lamps and captured 60% of the Japanese market. He named his firm Sanyo, meaning "three oceans" in Japanese, hoping that he would be able to sell his products across the Indian, Pacific and Atlantic Oceans. The growing demand for home appliances and washing machines would fuel Sanyo's growth through the 1950s.

== Later life ==
Iue retired and handed the presidency of Sanyo to his brother in 1968. During his retirement, he worked to promote development of Awaji Island and died in 1969. After a series of unprofitable quarters, Sanyo's story would go full circle as it was acquired in 2009 by Panasonic Corporation, the firm where Iue originally worked at alongside his brother-in-law, Konosuke Matsushita.

== Family tree ==
Matsushita Uemon
Yasuda Koichiro	Toku Eda	Mastsushita Kusunoki	Hirata Tosuke	Maeda Toshiaki	Mitsui Takamine
Tetsujiro Nakao	Yasue	Jun Iue	Yurou Iue	Toshio Iue	Mumeno	Konosuke Matsushita	Hirata Shodo	Shizuko	Maeda Toshisada	Keiko	Mitsui Hachirōemon
Satoshi Iue	Matsushita Sachiko	Masaharu Matsushita	Hirata Katsumi	Nobuko
Toshimasa Iue	Hiro Matsushita	Masayuki Matsushita (松下正幸	Atsuko
