= Shōdō Hirata =

Japanese painter

Hirata Shōdō
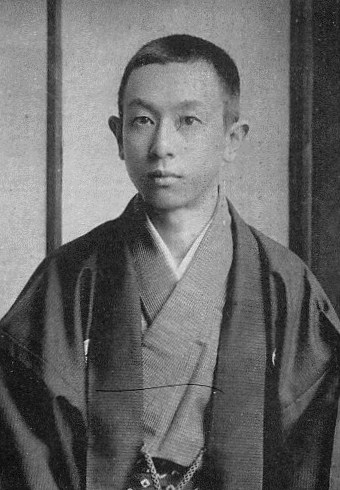
- Shōdō Hirata
- Born: Eiji Hirata; February 2, 1882; Tokyo, Japan
- Died: January 9, 1971 (aged 88); Tokyo, Japan
- Known for: Painter
- Movement: Nihonga
- Spouse: Shizuko Hirata
- Children: Masaharu Matsushita (son); Katsumi Hirata (daughter)
- Parents: Hirata Tosuke (father); Hirata Tatsu (mother)
- Relatives: Yamagata Isaburō (uncle); Yamagata Aritomo (Great-uncle); Maeda Toshiaki(Nanokaichi Domain) (father in law) Maeda Toshisada (brother in law) Toshinari Maeda (brother in law)
- Family: Hirata Noboru (brother) Masayuki Matsushita (grandson) Hiro Matsushita (grandson)

Shodo Hirata (平田松堂; February 2, 1882 – January 9, 1971) was a Japanese painter who was active from the Meiji era to the Showa era, mainly in public exhibitions. He studied under Kawai Gyokudo and was particularly adept at bird and flower painting.

== Early life ==
Shodo Hirata was born in 1882 in Ushigome, Tokyo. He was the second son of Count Hirata Tosuke, who was a Japanese statesman and Lord Keeper of the Privy Seal of Japan, active during the Meiji and Taishō periods of the Empire of Japan.

== Career ==
After studying under Kawai Gyokudo, he entered the Tokyo Academy of Fine Arts in 1901 and graduated in 1906.

Hirata Shodo participated in the very first art exhibition organized by the Japan Art Academy, called BUNTEN, in 1907. His painting Yuku Aki was selected for recognition and his works were equally favoured at future BUNTEN exhibitions.

In 1921, he became a professor at the Tokyo Academy of Fine Arts. He also served as a judge at the 7th Imperial Exhibition in 1926. He was the chairman of the Dai-nippon Drawing and Handicraft Association, and a member of the Ministry of Education, Culture, Sports, Science and Technology's Drawing Textbook Compilation committee.

== Notable works ==
- Autumn (1907)
- Autumn Colors (1910)
- Autumn in the Trees (1912)
- The Voice of a Small Bird (1914)
- Matsukanno Haru (Spring Between the Pine) (1915)

== Hirata family tree ==
Matsushita Uemon
Yasuda Koichiro	Tokue Matsushita	Masakusu Matsushita	Hirata Tosuke	Maeda Toshiaki (前田利昭)	Mitsui Takamine (10th head of the Mitsui family)
Tetsujiro Nakao	Yasue	Jun Iue	Yurou Iue	Toshio Iue	Mumeno	Konosuke Matsushita	Shodo Hirata	Shizuko	Maeda Toshisada	Keiko	Mitsui Takakimi (11th head of the Mitsui family)
Satoshi Iue	Matsushita Sachiko	Masaharu Matsushita	Hirata Katsumi	Nobuko
Iue Toshimasa	Hiro Matsushita	Masayuki Matsushita (松下正幸)	Atsuko
