= Hiro Matsushita =

Japanese businessman and former racing driver

- ヒロ松下
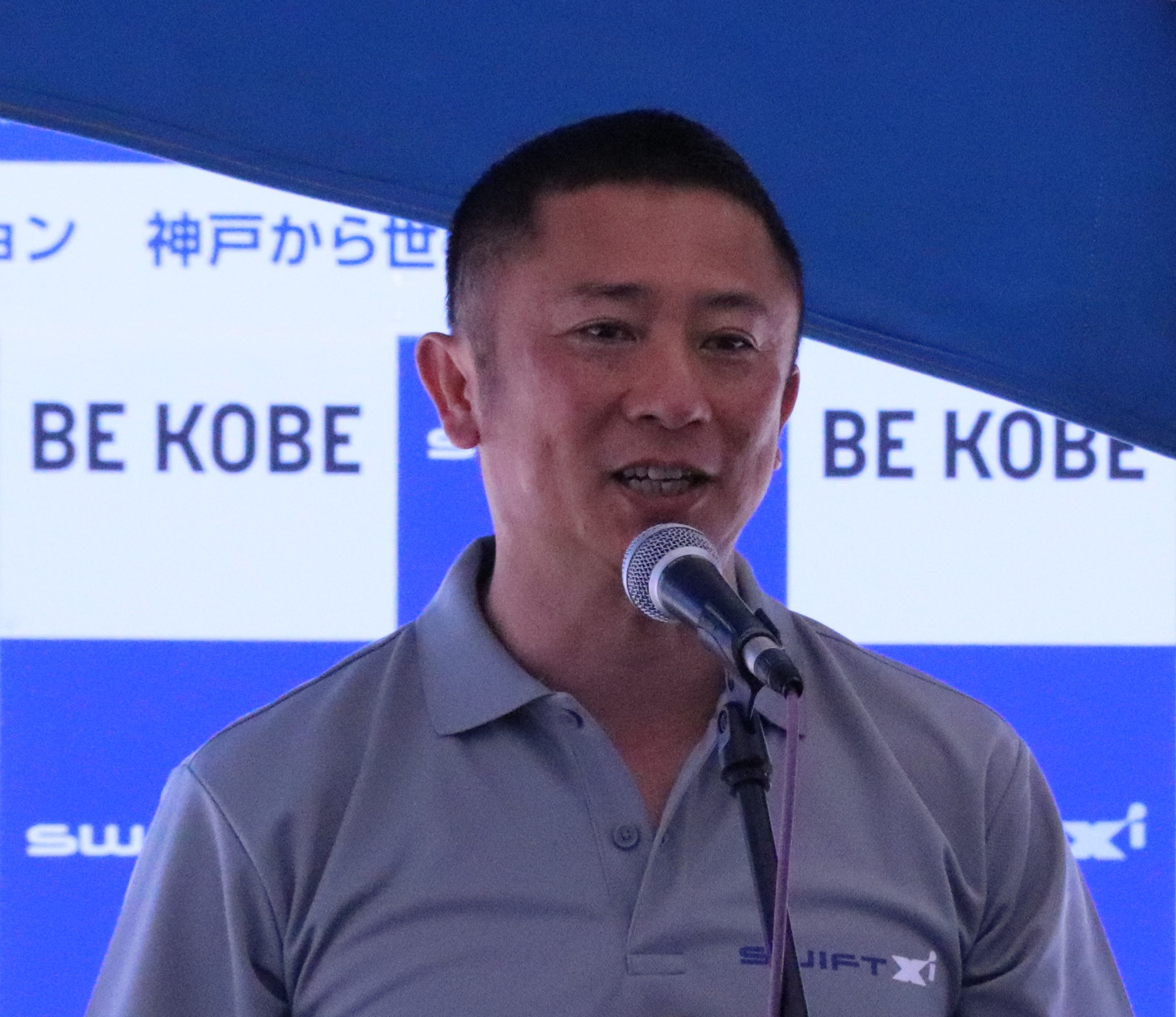
- Matsushita in 2018
- Born: Hiroyuki Matsushita; March 14, 1961 (age 65); Nishinomiya, Japan
- Other name: King Hiro
- Education: Konan University
- Occupations: Businessperson, former racing driver
- Known for: First Japanese driver to race in the Indy 500
- Notable work: The first and only Japanese driver to win the Toyota Atlantic Championship (Pacific)
- Height: 175 cm (5 ft 9 in)
- Title: Chairman & CEO – Swift Engineering; Chairman & CEO – Swift Xi Inc.; Chairman & CEO – Matsushita International Corp
- Spouse: Mitsuko Matsushita
- Children: 1
- Parents: Masaharu Matsushita (father); Sachiko Matsushita (mother)
- Relatives: Yamagata Isaburō (great-great-uncle); Toshio Iue (uncle); Maeda Toshisada(great-uncle)
- Family: Kōnosuke Matsushita (grandfather); Hirata Shodo (grandfather); Hirata Tosuke (great-grandfather)

Signature
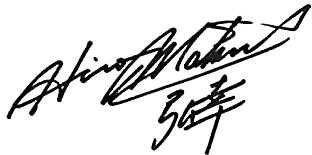

Hiroyuki Matsushita (松下弘幸, Matsushita Hiroyuki), also known by Hiro Matsushita (ヒロ松下), is a Japanese businessman and former racing driver. He is the grandson of Kōnosuke Matsushita, the founder of Panasonic. In 1989, Matsushita won the Toyota Atlantic Championship (Pacific), becoming the first and only Japanese driver to do so. He was also the first Japanese driver to race in the Indy 500.

== Early life ==
Matsushita was born in Nishinomiya, Hyōgo Prefecture as the youngest son of Masaharu Matsushita, who was the second president of Panasonic for sixteen years from 1961. He graduated from Konan University. His elder brother, Masayuki Matsushita served as a vice chairman of Panasonic for over a decade.

== Racing career ==
Despite being the grandson of the founder of Panasonic, he refused to be labelled as a rich kid who could buy his way into anything. He instead worked his way up from the bottom, starting his career racing motorcycles in his home country between 1977 and 1980, before switching to four wheels. He retired from Motocross racing by becoming Champion in Kansai region in 1980 at the age of 19.

In 1987, Matsushita started racing Formula Fords - the Class A of auto racing - In the following year, he teamed up with Jim Downing in a Camel Lights car and secured a second-place finish in class at the 24 Hours of Daytona and a third-place finish at the 12 Hours of Sebring. In 1989, Matsushita fearlessly entered the Formula Atlantic series and, by the end of that year, he had claimed four victories and the Toyota Atlantic championship (Pacific division) with the largest point margin of all time. He then tried Formula Pacific in New Zealand and became the first Japanese driver to win the prestigious Lady Wigram Trophy Race.

Matsushita graduated to Champ Car in 1990, scoring one point in his debut season. He became the first Japanese driver to race in the Indianapolis 500. In 1991, and followed that achievement with a top-ten finish at Milwaukee. Matsushita missed the 1992 Indy 500 after suffering a broken leg during a practice crash. He was sidelined for several weeks and missed the next six events.

At the Phoenix race in 1994, Matsushita endured a serious crash when his car was cut in half by Jacques Villeneuve's car travelling at nearly full speed., he escaped with only minor injuries. The same year, he earned his best career finish of 6th position at the Marlboro 500 at Michigan International Speedway. This result was made possible by an extraordinarily high rate of attrition that saw only 8 cars finish the race. Matsushita was 11 laps behind the leader at the drop of the checkered flag.

By the time he retired in 1998, Matsushita had started 117 Champ Car races for Dick Simon Racing, Walker Racing, Arciero/Wells Racing and Payton/Coyne. He holds the record for most starts in American Championship Car Racing history without scoring a Top 5.

In 2001, Matsushita competed in the Baja 1000 off-road race, in a Mitsubishi Montero.

== Racing record ==
=== WCAR/SCCA Western Formula Atlantic Championship results ===
Year	Team	Points	Car	races	wins	podiums	pole positions	Pos.
1988	Panasonic Racing	118	Swift DB4	10	1	4		3

=== IMSA Camel Lights results ===
Year	Team	Points	Car	races	wins	podiums	pole positions	Pos.
1988	Downing/Atlanta Racing	64	Argo JM19 Mazda	6		3		11

=== Toyota Atlantic Championship (pacific) results ===
Year	Team	Points	Car	races	wins	podiums	pole positions	Pos.
1989	Panasonic Racing	141	Swift DB4	9	4	8	3	1

=== Lady Wigram Trophy results ===
Year	Team	Car	race	Laps	Pos.
1989	Team Panasonic	Swift Cosworth	1	8	1

=== American open–wheel racing results ===
==== Indy Lights ====
Year	Team	1	2	3	4	5	6	7	8	9	10	11	12	Rank	Points
1989	Panasonic Racing	PHX	LBH	MIL	DET	POR; 13	MEA; 12	TOR; 6	POC	MDO	ROA	NAZ; 8	LAG	18th	14

==== CART ====
Year	Team	No.	Chassis	Engine	1	2	3	4	5	6	7	8	9	10	11	12	13	14	15	16	17	18	19	Rank	Points	Ref
1990	Dick Simon Racing	10	Lola T89/00	Cosworth DFS V8 t	PHX	LBH; 19	INDY; DNQ	MIL	DET; 19	POR; 12	CLE	MEA; 16	TOR	MIS	DEN; 15	VAN; 23	MDO; 17	ROA; 18	NZR; 21	LS; 23				31st	1	
1991	Dick Simon Racing	7	Lola T90/00	Cosworth DFS V8 t	SRF; 21		PHX; 14		MIL; 10	DET; 14	POR; 14													23rd	6	
1991	Dick Simon Racing	7	Lola T91/00	Cosworth DFS V8 t		LBH; 13						CLE; 14	MEA; 12	TOR; 15	MIS; 19	DEN; 14	VAN; 16	MDO; 14	ROA; 12	NZR; 12				23rd	6	
1991	Dick Simon Racing	7	Lola T91/00	Buick 3300 V6 t				INDY; 16																23rd	6	
1991	Dick Simon Racing	7	Lola T91/00	Chevrolet 265A V8 t																	LS; 20			23rd	6	
1992	Dick Simon Racing	11	Lola T92/00	Chevrolet 265A V8 t	SRF; DNS	PHX; 16	LBH; 10	INDY; DNS	DET	POR	MIL	NHM	TOR	MIS	CLE; 24	ROA; 14	VAN; 13	MDO; 18	NZR; 14	LS; 15				27th	3	
1993	Walker Racing	15	Lola T93/00	Ford XB V8 t	SRF; 11	PHX; 10	LBH; 14	INDY; 18	MIL; 13	DET; 13	POR; 21	CLE; 12	TOR; 16	MIS; 14	NHM; 13	ROA; 13	VAN; 12	MDO; 13	NZR; 21	LS; 19				26th	7	
1994	Dick Simon Racing	22	Lola T94/00	Ford XB V8 t	SRF; 15	PHX; 27	LBH; DNQ	INDY; 14	MIL; 23	DET; DNQ	POR; 21	CLE; 15	TOR; 18	MIS; 6	MDO; 18	NHM; 17	VAN; DNQ	ROA; 14	NZR; 16	LS; 23				26th	8	
1995	Arciero-Wells Racing	25	Reynard 94i	Ford XB V8 t	MIA; 26	SRF; 11	PHX; 22	LBH; 19	NZR; DNS															28th	5	
1995	Arciero-Wells Racing	25	Reynard 95i	Ford XB V8 t						INDY; 10	MIL; 19	DET; 14	POR; 17	ROA; 13	TOR; 19	CLE; 13	MIS; 20	MDO; 15	NHM; 22	VAN; 17	LS; 22			28th	5	
1996	Payton/Coyne Racing	19	Lola T96/00	Ford XB V8 t	MIA; 18	RIO; 24	SRF; 10	LBH; 28	NZR; 26	500; 14	MIL; 28	DET; 19	POR; 21	CLE; 17	TOR; 27	MIS; 15	MDO; 19	ROA; 15	VAN; 15	LS; 23				28th	3	
1997	Arciero-Wells Racing	24	Reynard 97i	Toyota RV8A V8 t Toyota RV8B V8 t	MIA; 21	SRF; 25	LBH; 20	NZR; 25	RIO; 23	STL; 15	MIL; 17	DET; 19	POR; 15	CLE; 20	TOR; 22	MIS; 9	MDO; 19	ROA; 24	VAN; 14	LS; 28	FON; 23			27th	4	
1998	Arciero-Wells Racing	24	Reynard 98i	Toyota RV8C V8 t	MIA; 23	MOT; 16	LBH; 19	NZR	RIO; 15	STL	MIL	DET	POR	CLE	TOR	MIS	MDO	ROA	VAN	LS	HOU	SRF	FON	30th	0	

=== 24 Hours of Le Mans results ===
Year	Team	Co-Drivers	Car	Class	Laps	Pos.	Class Pos.
1999	Team Goh; David Price Racing	(Japan) Hiroki Katoh (Japan) Akihiko Nakaya	BMW V12 LM	LMP	223	DNF	DNF

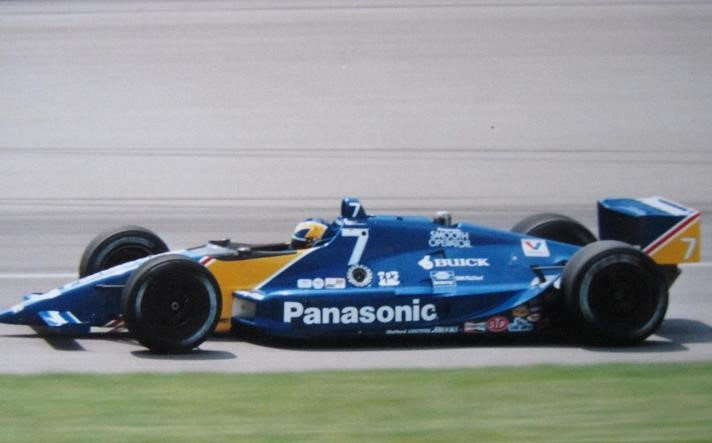
Hiro Matsushita in 1991

Hiro Matsushita
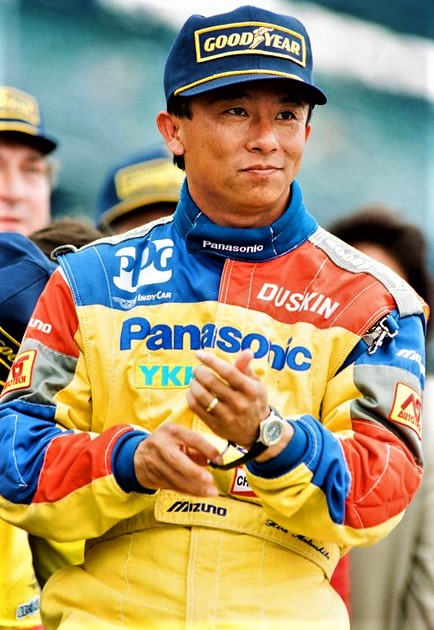
- Matsushita in 1990s
- Retired: 2001

CART, Championship Car, Indy Car, American Racing Series, Champ Car Atlantic Series, Lady Wigram Trophy
- Years active: 1987–2001
- Teams: Dick Simon Racing; Paragon Racing; Walker Racing; Arciero-Wells Racing; Payton/Coyne Racing
- Starts: 158
- Wins: 6
- Podiums: 16
- Poles: 3
- Fastest laps: 0

Championship titles
- 1989: Champ Car Atlantic Series; Lady Wigram Trophy

Awards
- 1998: Champions Club

== Nickname ==
Matsushita earned the nickname "King Hiro" from Emerson Fittipaldi, who was complaining about Matsushita's reluctance to cede track position when getting lapped by the leaders. The nickname came about as a result of the voice-activated microphone ("vox") Roger Penske's team was using. Fittipaldi's epithet was said so quickly that the circuit cut off the first syllable of the first word he used. Fittipaldi, allegedly, had intended to say "Fucking Hiro!"

== Business career ==
Matsushita, a successful businessman, owns Matsushita International Corp, a firm specializing in real estate, finance, and insurance. This company has ownership of Swift Engineering, an American engineering firm that builds autonomous systems, helicopters, submarines, spacecraft, ground vehicles, robotics, and composite parts. Swift was well-known for producing racing cars for various open-wheel racing series such as Formula Ford, Formula Atlantic, the Champ Car World Series, and Formula Nippon.

== Awards ==
In 1998, Hiro Matsushita was inducted into the Champions Club during the CART Year End Banquet on November 2 at the Century Plaza in Los Angeles, California.

== Matsushita family tree ==
Matsushita Uemon
Yasuda Koichiro	Tokue Matsushita	Masakusu Matsushita	Hirata Tosuke	Maeda Toshiaki (前田利昭	Mitsui Takamine10th head of the Mitsui family
Tetsujiro Nakao	Yasue	Jun Iue	Yurou Iue	Toshio Iue	Mumeno	Konosuke Matsushita	Hirata Shodo	Shizuko	Maeda Toshisada	Keiko	Mitsui Takakimi11th head of the Mitsui family
Satoshi Iue	Matsushita Sachiko	Masaharu Matsushita	Hirata Katsumi	Nobuko
Iue Toshimasa	Hiro Matsushita	Masayuki Matsushita (松下正幸)	Atsuko

== Personal life ==
Matsushita resides in San Clemente, California. He has a son called Takayuki Matsushita, who is a lawyer residing in the United States.

== See also ==
- Konosuke Matsushita
- Panasonic
- Masaharu Matsushita
- Swift Engineering

Sporting positions
Preceded by Dean Hall	North American Formula Atlantic; Pacific Division Champion; 1989	Succeeded by Mark Dismore
Preceded by Dean Hall	Lady Wigram Trophy; Winner; 1989	Succeeded by Craig Baird
