= Gen Hirose =

Japanese businessman (1904–1996)

- Born: May 21, 1904
- Died: January 10, 1996 (aged 91)
- Occupation: Businessman
- Known for: President of Nippon Life

Gen Hirose (弘世 現, Hirose Gen; May 21, 1904 – January 10, 1996) was a Japanese businessman and president of Nippon Life.

== Background ==
Hirose was the adopted son-in-law of Suketarō Hirose; his daughter's husband was the Honorary President of Suntory.

In 1985 he received the highest distinction of the Scout Association of Japan, the Golden Pheasant Award.

Business positions
Preceded by Tatsu Naruse	President of Nippon Life; 1948–1982	Succeeded by Masaharu Matsushita
Non-profit organization positions
Preceded by Konosuke Matsushita	Chairman of Ise Grand Shrine Worshippers' Association; 1983–1996	Succeeded by Morisada Hosokawa
