= Kōnosuke Matsushita =

Japanese industrialist (1894–1989)

- 松下 幸之助
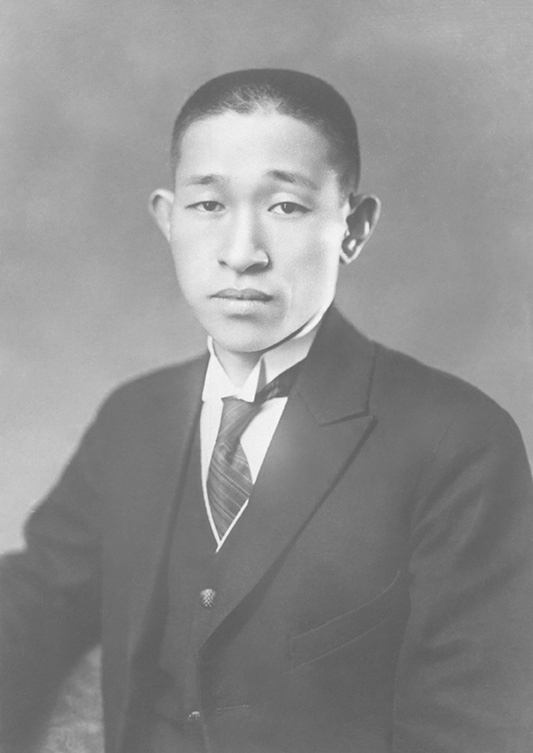
- Matsushita in 1929
- Born: 27 November 1894; Wakayama, Empire of Japan
- Died: 27 April 1989 (aged 94); Moriguchi, Osaka, Japan
- Other name: God of Management
- Occupations: Businessman and industrialist
- Known for: Founder of Panasonic
- Spouse: Mumeno Matsushita
- Children: 2
- Relatives: Masaharu Matsushita (son-in-law)
- Family: Hiro Matsushita (grandson); Masayuki Matsushita (grandson)
- Awards: Order of the House of Orange Decorated Commander in the Order of Orange (1958); Order of the Sacred Treasure; Order of the Rising Sun (29 April 1981); Order of the Paulownia Flowers (29 April 1987); Order of the Defender of the Realm (Panglima Mangku Negara which carries the title "Tan Sri"); Order of the Crown; Medal with Blue Ribbon; Medal with Dark Blue Ribbon; Honorary Commander of the Order of the Defender of the Realm; China Reform Friendship Medal (2018)

Japanese name
- Kanji: 松下 幸之助
Transcriptions
- Romanization: Matsushita Kōnosuke

Kōnosuke Matsushita (松下 幸之助, Matsushita Kōnosuke; 27 November 1894 – 27 April 1989) was a Japanese industrialist who founded Panasonic, the largest Japanese consumer electronics company. Matsushita is referred to as the "God of Management" in Japan.

== Early life ==
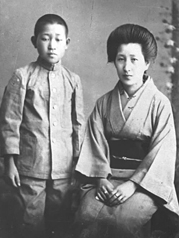
Matsushita and the wife of a bicycle shop owner. Matsushita worked in the shop. (c. 1904–5)

Kōnosuke Matsushita was born on 27 November 1894 in Wasamura, now part of Wakayama Prefecture. His father was an affluent landlord in the farming village of Wasa (part of present-day Wakayama city) and was one of the wealthiest men of his community.

Shortly after Matsushita left school, he was sent away to Osaka to become an apprentice for a Japanese barbecue restaurant. The business failed within a year, and Matsushita joined the Osaka Electric Light Company, an electrical utility company. During this period, he married Mumeno Iue, a friend of his sister. At the age of 22, he was promoted to the position of electrical inspector.

== Matsushita Electric Industrial Company ==
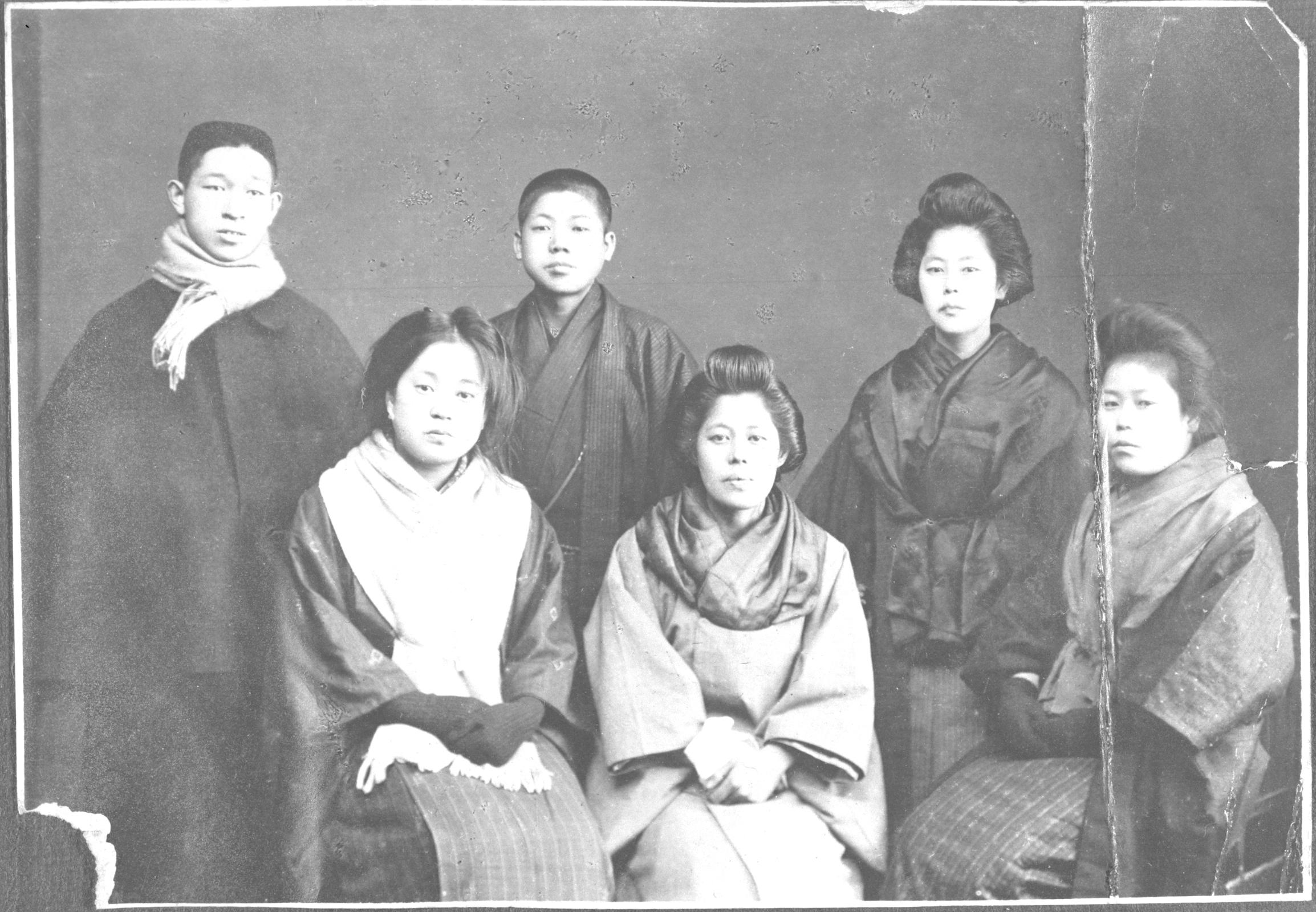
Members of Matsushita Electric Housewares Manufacturing Works. Back row from left, Kōnosuke Matsushita, Toshio Iue, Mumeno Matsushita (c. 1918)

In 1917, Matsushita left Osaka Electric Light Company to establish his own company. He set up his shop in the basement of his tenement where with his wife, his brother-in-law, and several assistants, he began producing product samples. However, most of Matsushita's assistants left the company, leaving only his wife and Iue, who played a key role as a salesman and manager. The early years of the company were difficult: he once had to pawn his wife's kimono when he found himself short on money. The company faced financial difficulties and was on the verge of bankruptcy until it received an unexpected order for a thousand insulator plates for electric fans. From there, Matsushita was able to continue producing his light sockets. Matsushita's products were originally marketed under the name brand of "National" and later moved on to the more recognizable names of Panasonic, Quasar and Technics.

One of Matsushita's best products was the development of a more efficient battery-powered bicycle lamp. During the 1920s, bicycle lamps were candles or oil-burning lamps which were highly inefficient as they usually only lasted for three hours. Matsushita introduced and created an oval lamp that used a battery for power and a lightbulb for illumination. To promote the product, he personally marketed it to retail bicycle shops.

== Expansion ==
While attempting to introduce his bicycle lamp to wholesalers, Matsushita began concentrating less on manufacturing and more on building a sales force, which led to the establishment of a retail store network and finally strengthened the company's position in Japan's electrical manufacturing and retail industry. In 1929, he began setting up a new structure for his company, which was structured as a parent company and branches of divisions that specialized in a particular product were created. At this time, the company focused on three key products: bicycle lamps and batteries, electrical sockets, and radios. For each of these products, a national sales department was formed with regional offices established in strategic locations. These regional offices were responsible for the coordination of sales and manufacturing, ensuring that production was aligned with market demand. As a result, manufacturing became directly dependent on sales.

== Post-war period ==
During the US occupation of Japan after World War II, General Douglas MacArthur decided to break up the zaibatsu business conglomerates of Japan. Matsushita was in danger of being removed as president but was saved by a favorable petition signed by 15,000 employees. In 1947, Kōnosuke lent his brother-in-law Toshio an underused manufacturing plant to manufacture bicycle lamps, a business that eventually became Sanyo Electric.

From 1950 to 1973, Matsushita's company became one of the world's largest manufacturers of electrical goods, sold under well-known trademarks including Panasonic and Technics. Matsushita stepped down as President of Panasonic in 1961 and was succeeded as president by his son-in-law, Masaharu Matsushita. Konosuke Matsushita's two grandsons are Masayuki Matsushita, who is the current vice-chairman of Panasonic, and Hiro Matsushita, who is a former driver in the Champ Car series and owns Swift Engineering, an aerospace firm and race car constructing company which he bought in 1991. Hiro Matsushita is also the chairman of Swift Xi, which is located in Kobe, Japan.

Konosuke Matsushita remained active in Panasonic's operations until his complete retirement in 1973. Since 1954, Matsushita also gained a significant shareholding in manufacturer JVC by forming an alliance. It still retains a 50% share today. In retirement, Matsushita focused on developing and explaining his social and commercial philosophies and wrote 44 published books. One of his books, entitled "Developing A Road To Peace And Happiness Through Prosperity", sold over four million copies. In 1979, at the age of 84, he founded the Matsushita Institute of Government and Management to train the future politicians and businessmen of Japan.

In 1987, he was awarded the Grand Cordon of the Order of the Paulownia Flowers.

== Death ==
Chronic lung problems led to his death from pneumonia on 27 April 1989, at the age of 94. He died with personal assets worth US$3 billion, and left a company with US$42 billion in revenue business.

== Awards and honours ==
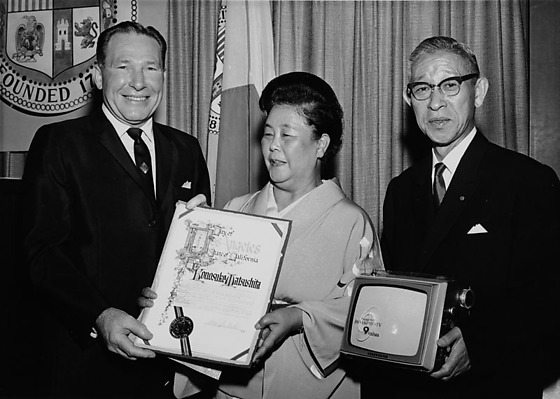
Los Angeles Mayor Sam Yorty presenting a certificate proclaiming 15 July as Matsushita Day to Kōnosuke and Mumeno at Los Angeles City Hall. Kōnosuke is holding a nine-inch Panasonic television, a gift to Los Angeles. (1963)

=== National honours ===
- Japan:
  - Grand Cordon of the Order of the Paulownia Flowers (29 April 1987)
  - Grand Cordon of the Order of the Rising Sun (29 April 1981)
  - Grand Cordon of the Order of the Sacred Treasure
  - Recipient of the Medal with Blue Ribbon
  - Recipient of the Medal with Dark Blue Ribbon
  - Senior Third Rank (27 April 1989; posthumous)

=== Foreign honours ===
- Belgium:
  - Commander of the Order of the Crown (1972)
- Malaysia:
  - Honorary Commander of the Order of the Defender of the Realm (P.M.N.) (1979)
- China:
  - Recipient of the China Reform Friendship Medal (18 December 2018; posthumous)

=== Professorships and Directorships ===
Konosuke Matsushita was honoured at Stanford University by endowing a Professorship in International Strategy and Management. The official name of the course is The Konosuke Matsushita Professorship in International Strategy and Management.

== Published books ==
- Michi wo hiraku (1968) Open the path and often translated as The Path
- Japan at the Brink (1976)
- Thoughts on Man (1982)
- Not for Bread Alone: A Business Ethos, A Management Ethic (1984)
- Quest for Prosperity (1988)
- As I See It (1989)
- Velvet Glove, Iron Fist: And 101 Other Dimensions of Leadership (1991)
- People before Products: The Human Factor in Business (1992)
- The Matsushita Perspective: A Business Philosophy Handbook (1997)
- The Heart of Management: Konosuke Matsushita's Enduring Insights (2002)
- My Way of Life and Thinking (2011) (Originally published in 1954)
- Practical Management Philosophy (2011) (Originally published in 1978)
- Nurturing Dreams – My Path in Life – An Autobiography by the Founder of Panasonic (2014) (Originally published in 1998)

== Appears on the cover of ==
- Life, Sep-1964, DETAILS: Meet Mr. Matsushita
- Time, 23 February 1962, DETAILS: Industrialist Matsushita

== Matsushita family tree ==
Matsushita Uemon
Yasuda Koichiro	Tokue Matsushita	Masakusu Matsushita	Hirata Tosuke	Maeda Toshiaki (前田利昭	Mitsui Takamine10th head of the Mitsui family
Tetsujiro Nakao	Yasue	Jun Iue	Yurou Iue	Toshio Iue	Mumeno	Kōnosuke Matsushita	Hirata Shodo	Shizuko	Maeda Toshisada	Keiko	Mitsui Takakimi11th head of the Mitsui family
Satoshi Iue	Matsushita Sachiko	Masaharu Matsushita	Hirata Katsumi	Nobuko
Iue Toshimasa	Hiro Matsushita	Masayuki Matsushita (松下正幸	Atsuko

== See also ==
- Panasonic
- Masaharu Matsushita
- Hiroyuki Matsushita
- Konosuke Matsushita Museum

Business positions
New title	President of Panasonic; 1935–1961	Succeeded by Masaharu Matsushita
New title	Chairman of Panasonic; 1961–1973	Succeeded by Arataro Takahashi
Non-profit organization positions
Preceded by Taneicho Nakano	Chairman of Ise Grand Shrine Worshippers' Association; 1974–1983	Succeeded by Gen Hirose
