= Castle Devachan =

Villa in Sanremo, Italy, built 1909

- Castello Devachan (Italian)
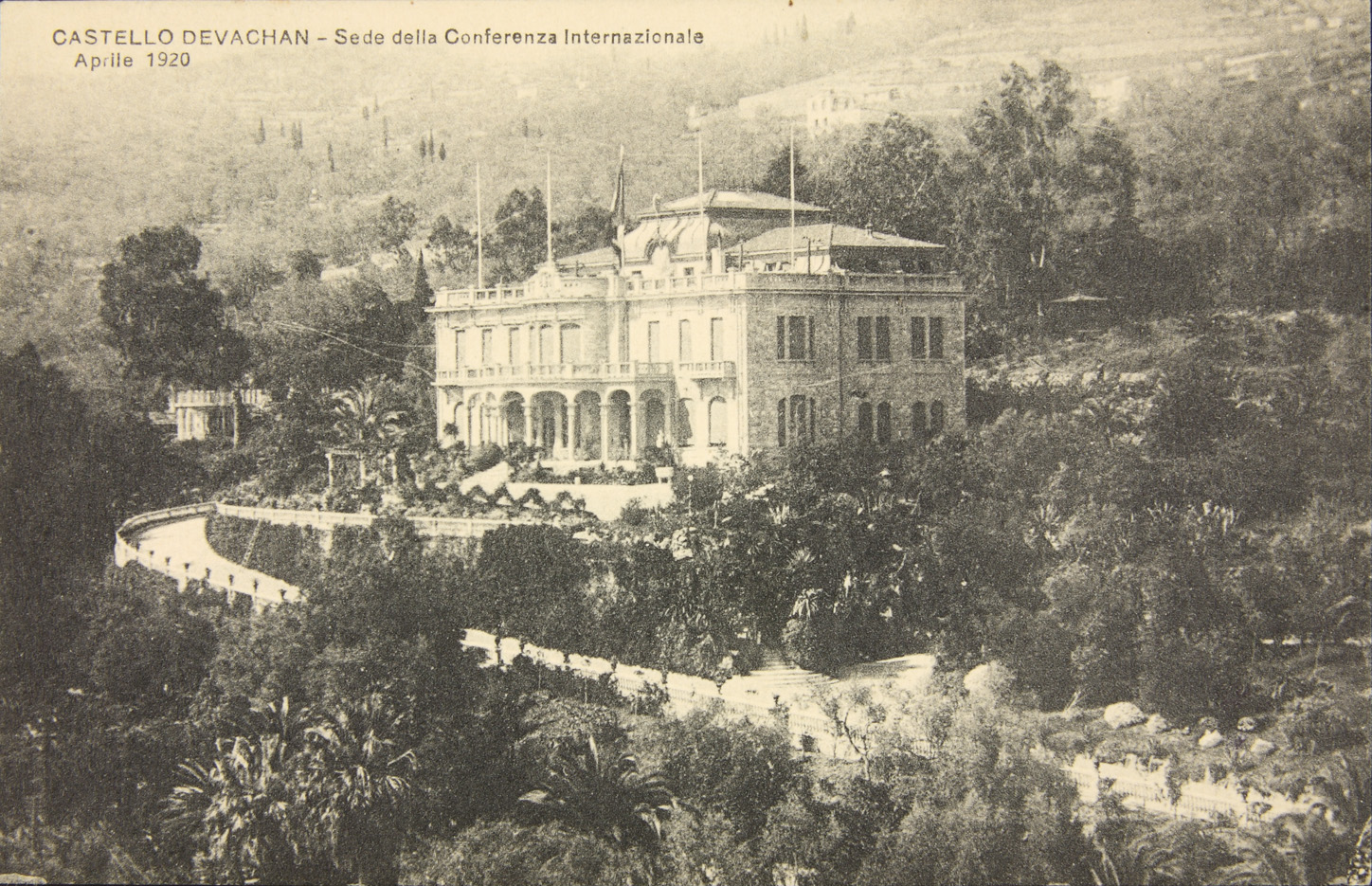
- Castle Devachan in Sanremo
- Click on the map for a fullscreen view

General information
- Location: Sanremo, Italy
- Coordinates: 43°48′57″N 7°45′39″E

Castle Devachan (Italian: Castello Devachan) is a historic villa situated in Sanremo, Italy.

== History ==
The villa, designed by Pietro Agosti in 1905, was built in 1909. The property originally belonged to John Horace Savile, 5th Earl of Mexborough. He had spent several years in Asia and had grown closer to Buddhism. For this reason, at the death of his second wife Sylvia, whom the villa was originally named after, the villa was renamed into Castle Devachan. Within Buddhist theosophy, Devachan refers to the temporary, intermediate state of being before the soul's eventual rebirth into the physical world.

In 1920, the villa hosted the famous San Remo Conference.

During the Second World War, the villa became the operational base for the SS in Sanremo, and was the location of the murder of fourteen Italian partisans.

== Description ==
The building features an eclectic style.
