= Maeda Toshisada =

Japanese politician

Viscount Toshisada Maeda
- 前田 利定
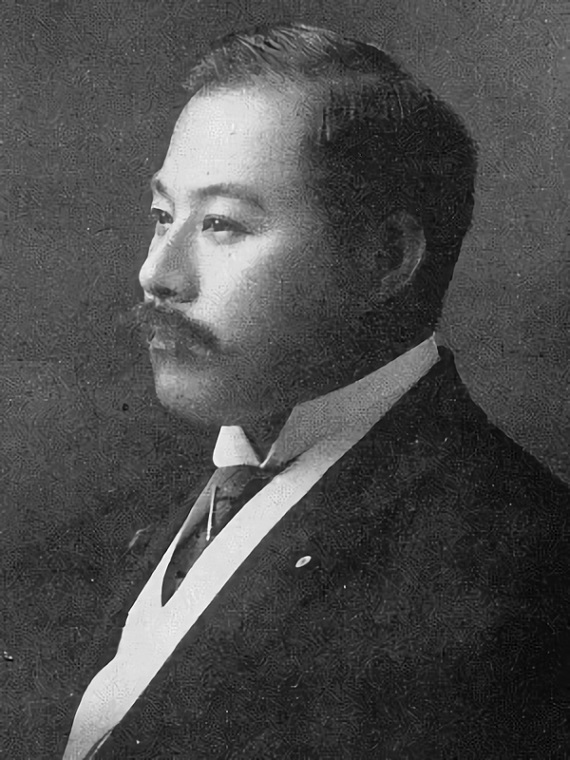
- Maeda in 1913

Minister of Agriculture and Commerce
- In office 7 January 1924 – 11 June 1924
- Prime Minister: Kiyoura Keigo
- Preceded by: Okano Keijirō
- Succeeded by: Takahashi Korekiyo

Minister of Communications
- In office 12 June 1922 – 2 September 1923
- Prime Minister: Katō Tomosaburō
- Preceded by: Noda Utarō
- Succeeded by: Inukai Tsuyoshi

Member of the House of Peers
- In office 10 July 1904 – 2 February 1944 Hereditary peerage

Personal details
- Born: 10 December 1874 Tokyo, Japan
- Died: 2 October 1944 (aged 69) Tokyo, Japan
- Relatives: Toshinari Maeda (brother); Katsuo Okazaki (son-in-law)
- Education: Tokyo Imperial University

Viscount Toshisada Maeda (前田 利定, Maeda Toshisada; 10 December 1874 – 2 October 1944) was a Japanese politician who was Minister of Communications and Minister of Agriculture and Commerce in the pre-war Empire of Japan.

== Biography ==
Toshisada Maeda was born in Tokyo, as the eldest son of Maeda Toshiaki, the final daimyō of Nanokaichi Domain in Kōzuke Province, and inherited his father’s kazoku peerage title of shishaku (viscount). His brother, Toshinari, was a general in the Imperial Japanese Army.

Toshisada Maeda was a graduate of Tokyo Imperial University. He served briefly in the infantry during the First Sino-Japanese War in 1894, and afterwards assumed his family’s seat in the House of Peers of the Diet of Japan in 1904. In 1922, he was the youngest man appointed Minister of Communications in the cabinet of Katō Tomosaburō.

Maeda subsequently served in the cabinet of Prime Minister Kiyoura Keigo as Minister of Agriculture and Commerce. He retired from public life in January 1944, and died in October of the same year. He was posthumously awarded the Order of the Sacred Treasures, 1st class.

Maeda studied poetry under Sasaki Nobutsuna. His daughter married post-war Foreign Minister Katsuo Okazaki.

== Family tree ==
Matsushita Uemon
Yasuda Koichiro	Toku Eda	Mastsushita Kusunoki	Hirata Tosuke	Maeda Toshiaki	Mitsui Takamine
Tetsujiro Nakao	Yasue	Jun Iue	Yurou Iue	Toshio Iue	Mumeno	Konosuke Matsushita	Hirata Shodo	Shizuko	Maeda Toshisada	Keiko	Mitsui Hachirōemon
Satoshi Iue	Matsushita Sachiko	Masaharu Matsushita	Hirata Katsumi	Nobuko
Iue Toshimasa	Hiro Matsushita	Masayuki Matsushita (松下正幸	Atsuko

Political offices
Preceded by Okano Keijirō	Minister of Agriculture & Commerce; Jan 1924 – Jun 1924	Succeeded by Takahashi Korekiyo
Preceded by Noda Utarō	Communications Minister; Jun 1922 – Sept 1923	Succeeded by Inukai Tsuyoshi
