= China Reform Friendship Medal =

Chinese medal

The China Reform Friendship Medal (Chinese: 中国改革友谊奖章) was a Chinese medal conferred on ten foreigners in 2018 for "their outstanding contributions to the country's reform and opening-up over the past 40 years".

The China Reform Friendship Medal was established back in 2018, the year of the 40th anniversary of China's reform and opening up. In appreciation of the international community's support and assistance to China's reform and opening up, the Party Central Committee has decided to celebrate this important anniversary by honouring ten individuals who have made outstanding contributions. This includes politicians who have opened international cooperation with China, entrepreneurs and experts who have taken the lead in China's modernisation. As well as prominent figures from international organisations who have been advocating and promoting Sino-foreign cooperation in trade, commerce, humanities and sports.

The design theme of the China Reform Friendship Medal is "Spring of Friendship". The peony flower, a traditional Chinese cultural element, is used as a symbol of the important contribution made by international friends to the prosperous development of China since the reform and opening up. The woven pattern and blue ribbon symbolise China's increasing integration and cooperation with the rest of the world.

== List of recipients ==
The ten recipients were:

- Alain Merieux
- Juan Antonio Samaranch
- Klaus Schwab
- Konosuke Matsushita
- Lee Kuan Yew
- Masayoshi Ohira
- Maurice Greenberg
- Robert Lawrence Kuhn
- Stephen Perry
- Werner Gerich

== See also ==
- Orders, decorations, and medals of China
