= Hirata Tosuke =

Japanese politician (1849–1925)

Senior Second Rank Count Hirata Tosuke
- 平田 東助
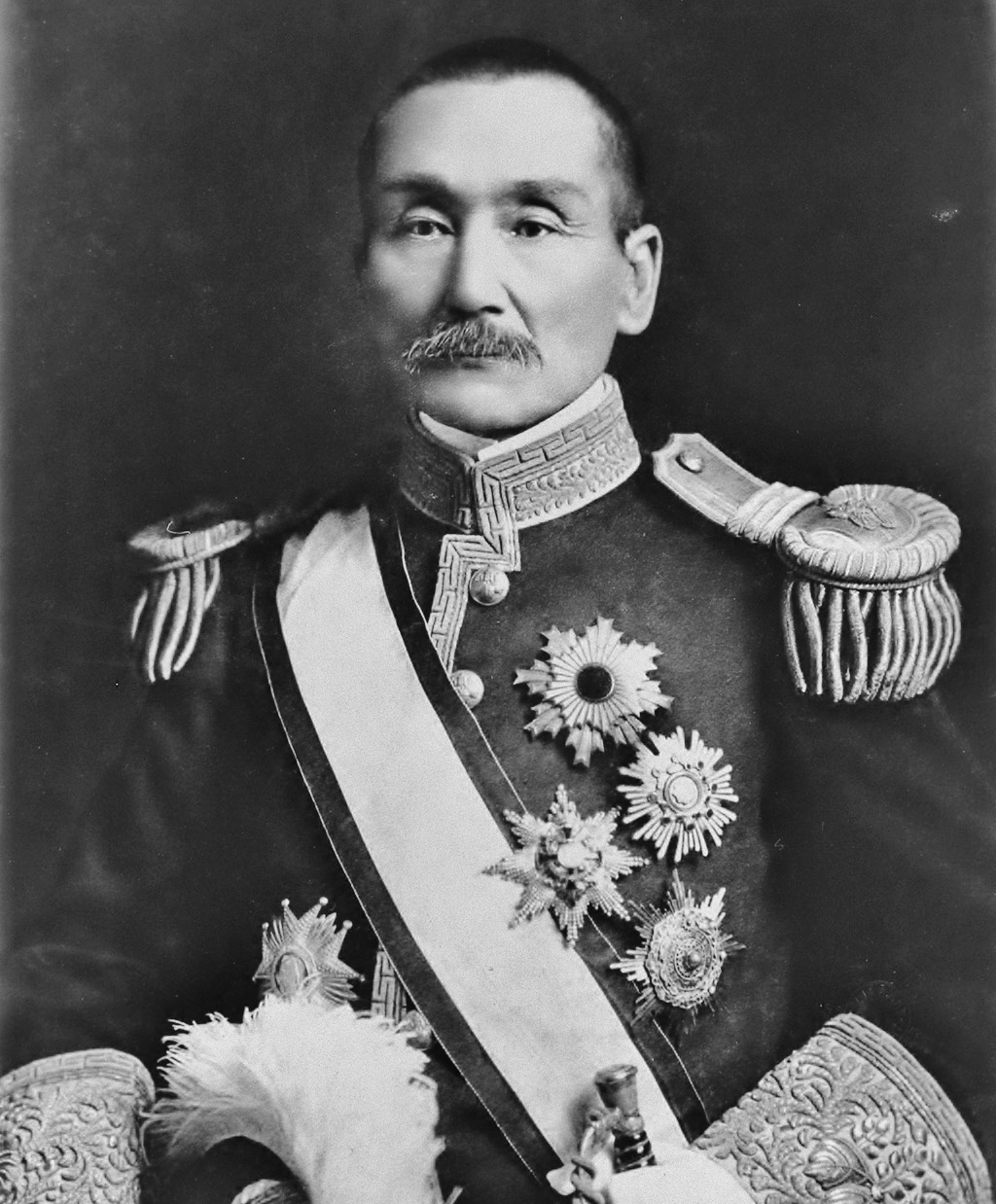

Lord Keeper of the Privy Seal
- In office 18 September 1922 – 30 March 1925
- Monarch: Taishō
- Preceded by: Matsukata Masayoshi
- Succeeded by: Makino Nobuaki

Minister of Home Affairs
- In office 14 July 1908 – 30 August 1911
- Prime Minister: Katsura Tarō
- Preceded by: Hara Takashi
- Succeeded by: Hara Takashi

Minister of Agriculture and Commerce
- In office 2 June 1901 – 17 July 1903
- Prime Minister: Katsura Tarō
- Preceded by: Hayashi Yūzō
- Succeeded by: Kiyoura Keigo

Member of the Privy Council
- In office 9 November 1898 – 2 December 1898
- Monarch: Meiji

Member of the House of Peers
- In office 29 September 1890 – 14 April 1925 Nominated by the Emperor

Personal details
- Born: 2 March 1849 Yonezawa, Dewa, Japan
- Died: 14 April 1925 (aged 76) Zushi, Kanagawa, Japan
- Party: Independent
- Children: Hirata Shodo; Noboru Hirata
- Relatives: Masaharu Matsushita (grandson); Hiro Matsushita (great-grandson)
- Education: Daigakkō; Heidelberg University; Leipzig University
- Occupation: Cabinet Minister, Legal Scholar

Count Hirata Tosuke (平田 東助; 2 March 1849 – 14 April 1925) was a Japanese statesman and the 7th Lord Keeper of the Privy Seal of Japan, active in the Meiji and Taishō period Empire of Japan.

== Biography ==
Hirata was born in the Yonezawa Domain, Dewa Province (currently Yamagata Prefecture) as the son of a local samurai. He was sent by the domain to Edo for studies, and subsequently fought in the Boshin War on the side of the Ōuetsu Reppan Dōmei. After the Meiji Restoration, was ordered by the domain to go to Tokyo and study at the Daigaku Nankō (predecessor of Tokyo Imperial University). After graduating, he was a student member of the Iwakura Mission of 1871 along with Makino Nobuaki. He later stayed in Germany to study at Heidelberg University (where he studied politics and international law) and Leipzig University (where he studied commercial law). He is the first Japanese with a doctorate degree.

Hirata returned to Japan in 1876 and served in a number of posts in the new Meiji government's Ministry of Finance, and later became Documentation Bureau Director of the Grand Council (Daijō-kan) and Legislation Bureau Director. In 1890, he was selected as a member of the House of Peers of the new Diet of Japan by Imperial command.

He successively held important posts including chief secretary of the Privy Council, director-general of the Legislation Bureau, Agriculture and Commerce Minister in the first Katsura cabinet, Home Minister in the second Katsura cabinet, provisional Diplomatic Investigation Board member, and Lord Keeper of the Privy Seal of Japan.

Hirata was also very active in the movement of local agricultural reforms, an industrial cooperative program, and poverty relief projects, striving to protect the local country people against the inflationary economy after the Russo-Japanese War and World War I.

== Family tree ==
Matsushita Uemon
Yasuda Koichiro | Toku Eda | Mastsushita Kusunoki | Hirata Tosuke | Maeda Toshiaki | Mitsui Takamine
Tetsujiro Nakao | Yasue | Jun Iue | Yurou Iue | Toshio Iue | Mumeno | Konosuke Matsushita | Hirata Shodo | Shizuko | Maeda Toshisada | Keiko | Mitsui Hachirōemon
Satoshi Iue | Matsushita Sachiko | Masaharu Matsushita | Hirata Katsumi | Nobuko
Iue Toshimasa | Hiro Matsushita | Masayuki Matsushita (松下正幸) | Atsuko

Political offices
| Preceded by Hayashi Yūzō | Minister of Agriculture & Commerce; June 1901 – Jul 1903 | Succeeded by Kiyoura Keigo |
| Preceded by Hara Takashi | Home Minister; July 1908 – February 1911 | Succeeded by Hara Takashi |
| Preceded by Matsukata Masayoshi | Lord Keeper of the Privy Seal; September 1922 – May 1925 | Succeeded by Hamao Arata |
