= Adam Zhu =

American investment banker (born 1965)

- Adam Zhu in 2023
- Born: May 20, 1965 (age 61)
- Education: BA in English Literature, MA in Applied Linguistics, and an MBA in Finance
- Alma mater: Temple University
- Occupations: Investment banker and media producer

Adam Zhu is an American investment banker and media producer for his work on China-related documentaries and public affairs television.

== Career ==
=== Finance career ===
Zhu is the chairman of Beijing Vive Sports & Entertainment Limited, Beijing Letz Wine & Spirits Limited, and Vice Chairman of the Board of Supervision of China Technology Innovation Corporation. He also serves as the Chairman of Letz Capital, LLC. Zhu is an investor in the Sunshine Company, The Lighthouse Creators Campus, Augustinus Bader, David Webb jewellery, Mijenta Tequila, and Fiol Prosecco in Italy. He is Vice Chairman of Playfully Technology, and a board member of FansMall Group.

Zhu was a Wall Street banker for over two decades. He was Managing Director of Investment Banking at Bank of America Merrill Lynch, and served as Head of Merrill Lynch's Beijing Representative Office. He also served in senior positions in the investment banking division at Citigroup.

Zhu is an investor and Advisory Board Member of CountryLine Media, a London and Nashville-based country music fan app backed by Elton John. In 2023, he became a partner in LaRoche-Vacquie, a Haut Armagnac producer in Gascony, France, and acquired the Saint-Georges Chapel vineyard in the same region.

He was chairman of Greater China and special advisor to the CEO of Bacardi Limited. Before joining Bacardi Limited, he was Chairman and CEO of IMG Greater China and Vice Chairman of IMG Asia Pacific (2011-2015). He also served as Chairman of Visual China Group, and a board member of the China Football Association Professional League Council.

=== Media production ===
Zhu is Executive Vice Chairman of The Kuhn Foundation, which supports science, philosophy, arts education, and a good relationship between the United States and China. The Foundation produced Closer To Truth, the long-running PBS series on cosmo, consciousness, and menaing. For over 30 years, Zhu has worked with his long-time partner Robert Lawrence Kuhn, on various China-related matters, including Kuhn's appearances in major international media.

Zhu is the co-creator and executive producer of the TV series China's Challenges, broadcast on PBS stations from 2014 to 2019, and Voices from the Frontlines: China's War on Poverty (PBS SoCal), which was nominated for a Los Angeles Area Emmy Award Los Angeles Area Emmy Awards (China's Challenges I, II, and III) in 2020 and won Telly Awards and the China Television Academy Starlight Award in the same year Telly Awards for TV Programs - Cultural (Voices from the Frontlines: China's War on Poverty). He also co-created and produces Closer to China with Robert Lawrence Kuhn on China Global Television Network (CGTN), a weekly series that features China’s thought leaders and decision-makers.

He has co-produced several books including The Man Who Changed China: The Life and Legacy of Jiang Zemin. and The Inside Story of China's 30-Year Reform (Shanghai Century Publishing Group, 2008), How China's Leaders Think (John Wiley, 2009, 2011) and the newly released Xi Jinping's New-Era China: The Inside Story (Pentagon Press 2026).

He has executive-produced and produced feature films and television programs such as Never Give Up (Sirius Film/Stars Light Pctures 2006), Beauty Remains (Emerging Pictures 2005), In Search of China (PBS/WETA 2000), The Korean War (40-episode drama, CCTV 2001), Red Capital Wave (CCTV 1999), China From Inside (BBC 2007), and China Visionaries (SMG 2009).

== Education ==
Zhu received a BA in English Literature from Xiangtan University, an MA in Applied Linguistics from Harbin Institute of Technology, and an MBA in Finance from Temple University.

== Personal life ==
Zhu has been married to Emma Qin Zhu, a trustee of The Colburn School, since 2005. They have supported various programs to promote arts and culture education and exchanges. Together, they have three children, and live in Newport Beach, California.

== Awards ==
Year	Award	Ref
2013	China News Awards	
2015	China News Awards	
2016	Los Angeles Area Emmy Awards (China's Challenges I, II, and III)	
2017	Telly Awards for TV Cultural Programming	
2018	Telly Awards for TV Cultural Programming	
2018	China News Awards	
2020	Telly Awards for TV Programs - Cultural (Voices from the Frontlines: China's War on Poverty)	
2020	China Television Starlight Awards	
