= Masaharu Matsushita =

Japanese businessman (1912–2012)

Masaharu Matsushita 松下正治 OBE
- Born: September 17, 1912; Tokyo, Empire of Japan
- Died: July 16, 2012 (aged 99); Osaka, Japan
- Education: University of Tokyo
- Occupations: Businessman, business executive
- Known for: 2nd President of Panasonic
- Spouse: Sachiko Matsushita
- Children: Masayuki Matsushita Hiro Matsushita
- Parents: Hirata Shodo (father); Shizuko Hirata (mother)
- Relatives: Konosuke Matsushita (father-in-law)
- Family: Hirata Tosuke (grandfather); Maeda Toshisada (uncle); Mitsui Takakimi 11th head of the Mitsui family (uncle); Yamagata Isaburō (great-uncle); Yamagata Aritomo (great-great-uncle)
- Awards: Order of the Sacred Treasure in 1984; Order of the British Empire in 1997

Japanese name
- Kanji: 松下 正治
Transcriptions
- Romanization: Matsushita Masaharu

Sir Masaharu Matsushita (松下 正治, Matsushita Masaharu; September 17, 1912 – July 16, 2012), was a Japanese businessman who served as the second President of Panasonic for sixteen years beginning in 1961. He was the son-in-law of Panasonic's founder, Konosuke Matsushita. Masaharu Matsushita has been credited with expanding Panasonic into a global brand during a time of high economic expansion in Japan.

== Biography ==
Matsushita was born Masaharu Hirata. He was the second son of Count Eiji Hirata (1882–1971) who was a painter and a professor of Tokyo School of Fine Arts and Tatsu, the adopted daughter of Viscount Shinagawa Yajirō. He originally studied law at the present-day University of Tokyo. Matsushita worked for Mitsui Bank before joining Panasonic. In April 1940, he married Sachiko Matsushita, the daughter of Panasonic's founder, and was adopted into her family, taking their surname. He began working for his father-in-law the following month.

Masaharu Matsushita is credited with turning Panasonic into a global electronics brand. He succeeded his father-in-law as President of Panasonic in 1961 as the company's second president. Under him, Panasonic retained its management philosophy, which emphasized teamwork and promoted the idea that bosses were equal to their employees. High ranking management performed more tasks with their employees, such as cleaning bathrooms. Panasonic's company philosophy has been admired and copied within the Japanese business world. Masaharu Matsushita held the presidency of Panasonic for sixteen years, during a period of worldwide growth for Japan. Toshihiko Yamashita took over the presidency in 1977. He was conferred the Grand Cordon of the Order of the Sacred Treasure in 1984, and was appointed an honorary Knight Commander of the Order of the British Empire (KBE) in 1997.

Masaharu Matsushita died at Matsushita Memorial Hospital in Osaka, a hospital founded by his father-in-law, on July 16, 2012, at the age of 99. He was survived by his wife, Sachiko, and their sons, Panasonic vice-chairman Masayuki Matsushita, and Hiro Matsushita who is a former driver in the Champ Car series and owns Swift Engineering, an aerospace firm in California and in 2018 Swift Engineering formed its subsidiary called Swift Xi located in Kobe.

Panasonic chairman Fumio Ōtsubo said of Matsushita, "I honor from the bottom of my heart his achievements in steering our company toward momentous growth."

== Honour ==
=== Foreign honour ===
- Malaysia : Honorary Commander of the Order of Loyalty to the Crown of Malaysia (P.S.M.) (1993)

== Matsushita family tree ==
Matsushita Uemon
Yasuda Koichiro | Tokue Matsushita | Masakusu Matsushita | Hirata Tosuke | Maeda Toshiaki (前田利昭 | Mitsui Takamine10th head of the Mitsui family
Tetsujiro Nakao | Yasue | Jun Iue | Yurou Iue | Toshio Iue | Mumeno | Konosuke Matsushita | Hirata Shodo | Shizuko Maeda | Maeda Toshisada | Keiko | Mitsui Takakimi11th head of the Mitsui family
Satoshi Iue | Matsushita Sachiko | Masaharu Matsushita | Hirata Katsumi | Nobuko
Iue Toshimasa | Hiro Matsushita | Masayuki Matsushita (松下正幸 | Atsuko Matsushita
