= The Man Who Changed China =

2005 book by Robert Lawrence Kuhn

The Man Who Changed China: The Life and Legacy of Jiang Zemin
- Author: Robert Lawrence Kuhn
- Language: English
- Subject: Politician Biography
- Genre: monograph
- Publisher: New York : Crown Publishers.
- Publication date: 2004
- Pages: 720 pages
- ISBN: 1400054745
- Dewey Decimal: 908 History with respect to groups of people

The Man Who Changed China: The Life and Legacy of Jiang Zemin is a biography of former Chinese leader Jiang Zemin by Robert Lawrence Kuhn. It was published in 2005, in English and Chinese. Facilitated by Kuhn's long-term partner, Adam Zhu, the book was the first biography of a living Chinese leader published in mainland China where it was the best-selling book of 2005. Its successful release garnered attention from Chinese media and the international press. The book was criticized as "propaganda" by some commentators.

== Publisher ==
It was published worldwide except in China by Random House imprints (Crown Publishers in English, Random House Kodansha in Japanese, Random House JoongAng in Korean). In China, it was published under the title Ta Gai Bian Le Zhong Guo: Jiang Zemin Zhuan (他改变了中国：江泽民传, literal translation "He Changed China: The Biography of Jiang Zemin") by Shanghai Century Publishing Group, one of China’s largest publishing groups.

== Reaction in China ==
Virtually overnight, the Chinese edition became the number one bestselling book in China with sales of over one million and substantial publicity across the country including front-page features and magazine cover stories. The book is recognized as the first time that a biography of a living Chinese leader has been published in mainland China, and stories of its success and influence in China have run in the international press. The Wall Street Journal wrote: “His [Kuhn’s] new book is a blockbuster in China, selling more copies here in a single month than any book since the last installment of ‘Harry Potter.’” The Washington Post reported that the “warm official embrace of Kuhn's book is unusual,” adding “the work represented his [Kuhn’s] own best effort to write a ‘personal story as told by Jiang's family, friends and colleagues’ that conveys Jiang's ‘way of thinking’ in the context of Chinese history and culture”. The Post described public reaction in China as “mixed”, stating, “Some readers have praised the book for breaking a taboo against discussing the personal lives of high officials and for presenting details of Jiang's life that were new to them. Others refused to buy it, dismissing it as propaganda”.

== Reception to the English Edition ==
The English edition was generally labeled political propaganda, an officially sanctioned portrait of Jiang, perhaps commissioned by Jiang himself, a book that was flattering or fawning and more autobiography than biography. Reviewing it in Foreign Affairs, Sinologist Bruce Gilley drew an analogy:

To write his biography, Mao Zedong chose Edgar Snow, a member of the U.S. Communist Party; Jiang chose Kuhn, a member of the U.S. business elite. An investment banker with a zeal for science, high culture, and business, Kuhn personifies the new ideology that has swept through China since 1989.

Gilley added that

Nothing better symbolizes Jiang and his cohort's transition to a right-wing developmental dictatorship; every year, they carefully chip away at their socialist heritage.

Kuhn responded to the charge that "Jiang chose Kuhn":

…The truth is almost the reverse. Jiang didn’t choose me; I chose Jiang. The book was my idea; I planned it, financed it, and wrote it to trace China’s story through eight tumultuous decades of trauma and transformation. I had help—translators, researchers, editors—but I maintained absolute editorial control and made every editorial decision, and no one in China ever thought otherwise….

Kuhn stated that his "rendition of events, such as the U.S. bombing of the Chinese embassy in Yugoslavia in 1999, differs markedly from that of the official Chinese media", stressing that it was his intention to "move beyond all the hype and bias about China so as to understand how Chinese leaders think." Even though the Chinese edition was censored in that sentences or sections (largely of an internal political nature) were cut (but nothing of substance was added), the Chinese publisher still felt compelled to warn readers, in an upfront "Publisher's Note," that "Certain viewpoints and opinions of the author, as a Westerner, bear a definite distance from those of our own. Hopefully the reader will understand."

== Jiang's reaction ==
When asked his own opinion of Kuhn's biography, Jiang Zemin told his close friend, Shen Yongyan (a primary source in the book), who then told the Chinese media that Jiang said: “He [Kuhn] wrote objectively; he didn’t try to beautify me. But he got my wedding date wrong.”
