= Robert Lawrence Kuhn =

American investment banker

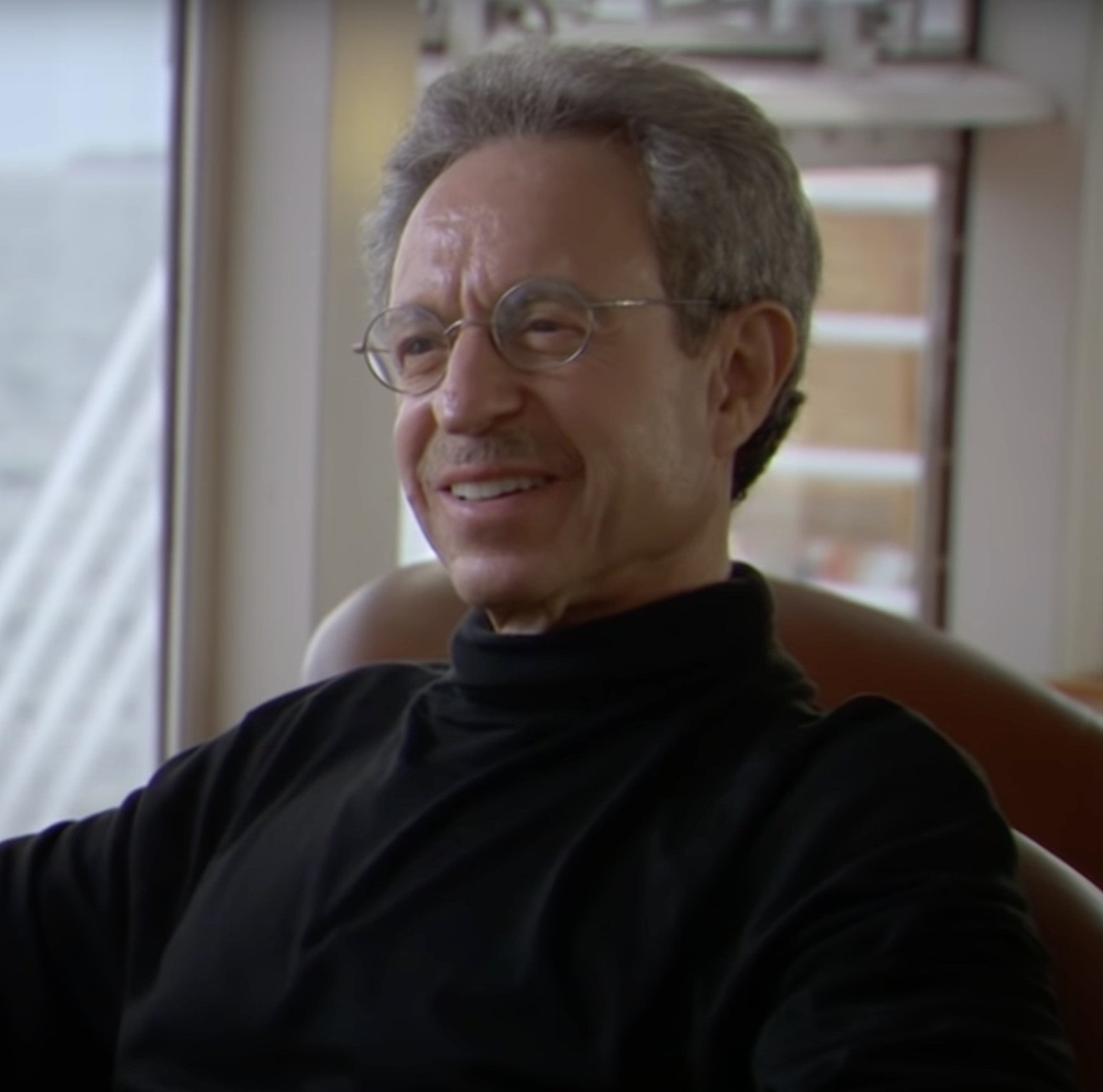
- Kuhn in 2020
- Born: November 6, 1944 (age 81); New York, U.S.
- Education: Johns Hopkins University (B.A.); University of California at Los Angeles (Ph.D.); MIT Sloan School of Management (M.S.)
- Occupations: Investment banker, writer
- Notable work: The Man Who Changed China
- Spouse: Dora Serviarian Kuhn
- Awards: China Reform Friendship Medal
- Website: rlkuhn.com

Robert Lawrence Kuhn (born November 6, 1944) is an American public intellectual and investment banker. He is also an author, television producer, columnist and commentator, especially on topics related to the People's Republic of China. Kuhn is the creator of the PBS series Closer to Truth which focuses on science and philosophy. He has been called "one of the Western world's most prolific interpreters of Beijing's policies". Some of his work has been criticized as pro-China propaganda.

== Education ==
Kuhn received a bachelor's degree in human biology from Johns Hopkins University (Phi Beta Kappa) in 1964, a PhD in anatomy and brain research from the University of California, Los Angeles' Brain Research Institute in 1968 and a Master of Science in management as a Sloan fellow from the MIT Sloan School of Management in 1980.

== Career ==
From 1991 to 2001, Kuhn was president and co-owner of the Geneva Companies, a mergers and acquisitions (M&A) firm representing privately owned, middle-market companies. In 2000, Kuhn sold the Geneva Companies to Citigroup.

Closer to Truth is a continuing television series on PBS and public television stations, created, executive-produced, written and hosted by Kuhn, and produced and directed by Peter Getzels. The series premiered in 2000 and completed its 33rd season in 2026 (Closer to Truth: Cosmos. Life. Mind. Meaning). It offers conversations with leading scientists, philosophers, theologians,and scholars on topics such as cosmology, physics, philosophy of science, philosophy of mind (consciousness), philosophy of biology, and philosophy of religion. Kuhn's presentation, "Asking Ultimate Questions", serves as the foundation of Closer To Truth. One series was partially funded by Jeffrey Epstein who paid less than half of what he committed.

In 2024, Kuhn published a paper titled A Landscape of Consciousness: Toward a Taxonomy of Explanations and Implications in the journal Progress in Biophysics and Molecular Biology. According to an article written by theoretical physicist and neuroscientist Àlex Gómez-Marín, Kuhn's article is described as “perhaps the most comprehensive” recent account of the landscape of theories of consciousness, noting that Kuhn's taxonomy encompassed approximately 225 theories. In 2025, Kuhn expanded this work in a feature article for New Scientist titled What 350 different theories of consciousness reveal about reality, presenting an accessible overview of more than 350 theories organized across ten categories ranging from materialism to idealism. In 2026, Kuhn further discussed the Landscape of Consciousness framework in a review article published in Current Neurology and Neuroscience Reports, examining its relevance for neurology and neuroscience and suggesting that the diversity of theories may inform research and clinical perspectives on disorders of consciousness. Also in 2026, Kuhn published an article in the Journal of Consciousness Studies examining the implications of the Landscape of Consciousness framework for broader philosophical questions, including artificial intelligence consciousness, virtual immortality, meaning and purpose, free will, and life after death. In 2026, Kuhn discussed the range of theories included in the project with philosopher and podcaster Alex O'Connor on the Within Reason podcast in an episode titled “Every Theory of Consciousness.”

=== China-related work ===
In 1989, Kuhn was invited to China by its director of the State Science and Technology Commission, Song Jian, whom Kuhn considers his mentor.

Kuhn wrote The Man Who Changed China: The Life and Legacy of Jiang Zemin. It was the first biography of a living Chinese leader and was a best-seller in China in 2005.

Kuhn is the author of the 2011 book How China's Leaders Think: The Inside Story of China's Past, Current and Future Leaders. He has also written about Xi Jinping as the latest core leader of the Chinese Communist Party (CCP) and the Chinese government response to COVID-19.

Kuhn has created or hosted TV and web series such as China's Challenges (with Peter Getzels as director), Closer To China with R.L. Kuhn (with Adam Zhu as co-producer), and The Watcher.

Kuhn provided live commentary on CNN during Xi Jinping's policy address in Seattle on September 2, 2015, during a state visit to the US. He had spoken at the launch ceremony of Xi's book, entitled The Governance of China, at the Frankfurt Book Fair on October 8, 2014.

In 2017, during the 19th National Congress of the Chinese Communist Party, Kuhn was interviewed extensively, including multiple times on CNN, BBC World News and BBC World Service, CGTN, and China Central Television (CCTV).

After Jiang Zemin died on November 30, 2022, Kuhn published his personal reflections, concluding that "history will be kind to Jiang Zemin."

==== Responses ====
In a book review essay published in Foreign Affairs, Bruce Gilley said Kuhn's The Man Who Changed China was actually better understood as an officially sanctioned autobiography, presenting an image that China's leaders want the world to see. Additionally, he said the writing of the book was, beginning in 2001, overseen by a secret state propaganda team. John Walsh, an assistant Professor at Shinawatra University, wrote that the first part of the book was "close to hagiography" because of its reliance on interviews with people who held the favorable views of Jiang Zemin, but concluded that it was "a valuable and lengthy contribution" that offered a fascinating portrait of Jiang and insight into China's political process. Gilley stated that the official government of China had censored as much as 10 percent of the content from the book in the Chinese language version, whereas the English language version was also modified to suit what the Chinese government deemed appropriate for Chinese and non-Chinese audiences to see. Gilley is quoted as saying,

Beginning in 2001, a secret state propaganda team oversaw the writing of the book. Ten percent of the English version was censored for the Chinese edition, but 90 percent remained the same: the book's main intended market was China itself (where it appeared simultaneously in Chinese and quickly sold a million copies). This is the image that Jiang and China's new leaders want their people to see. How then do they style themselves, and what does this mean for China's future?

Kuhn responded in 2006 in Foreign Affairs, saying,

My intention (as stated in the book itself, on pages 691-92) was to move beyond all the hype and bias about China so as to understand how Chinese leaders think.... Jiang didn't choose me; I chose Jiang. The book was my idea; I planned it, financed it, and wrote it to trace China's story through eight tumultuous decades of trauma and transformation. I had help -- translators, researchers, editors -- but I maintained absolute editorial control and made every editorial decision, and no one in China ever thought otherwise….

My rendition of events, such as the U.S. bombing of the Chinese embassy in Yugoslavia in 1999, differs markedly from that of the official Chinese media. In a publisher's note, Chinese readers are advised: "Certain viewpoints and opinions of the author, as a Westerner, bear a definite distance from those of our own. Hopefully the reader will understand."

My book is unprecedented -- the first biography of a living leader published on the mainland. Furthermore, there is inside information in it that Chinese media and officials aver that they never knew. One reporter complained publicly about the fact that this breakthrough was made by a foreigner.

According to The Wire China, in the 17 years since his book's publication, "Kuhn has regularly deflected accusations that he is a propagandist for the Chinese government." He has carved out a niche as "one of the Western world’s most prolific interpreters of Beijing’s policies," "currying favor with China’s leadership and gaining remarkable access." Kuhn says that he has spent the past few decades "helping the world understand China and China understand the world." According to the China Media Project, Kuhn "regularly features on Chinese state media, closely mirroring CCP talking points."

== Awards and recognition ==
In 2018 Xi Jinping awarded Kuhn the China Reform Friendship Medal for his contributions to the reform and opening up over the past four decades.

== Select publications ==
- Kuhn, Robert Lawrence (2026). "Theories on the landscape—an orthogonal approach". Journal of Consciousness Studies. 33 (1–2): 40–56. doi:10.53765/20512201.33.1.040.
- Kuhn, Robert Lawrence (December 20, 2025). "What a "Landscape of Consciousness" Means for Neurology and Neuroscience". Current Neurology and Neuroscience Reports. 26 (1) 5. doi:10.1007/s11910-025-01471-1. ISSN 1534-6293. PMC 12718250. PMID 41420689.
- Kuhn, Robert Lawrence (October 25, 2025). "Landscape of consciousness: What 350 different theories of consciousness reveal about reality". New Scientist: 36–40. doi:10.1016/S0262-4079(25)01750-6.
- Kuhn, Robert Lawrence (2024). "A Landscape of Consciousness: Toward a Taxonomy of Explanations and Implications". Progress in Biophysics and Molecular Biology. 190: 28–169. doi:10.1016/j.pbiomolbio.2023.12.003. PMID 38281544.
- Robert Lawrence Kuhn (November 19, 2009). How China's Leaders Think: The Inside Story of China's Reform and What This Means for the Future. John Wiley & Sons. pp. 278–. ISBN 978-0-470-82590-7. Archived from the original on December 12, 2023.
- The Man Who Changed China: The Life and Legacy of Jiang Zemin. January 11, 2005.
