= Konosuke Matsushita Museum =

Panasonic corporate museum in Osaka, Japan

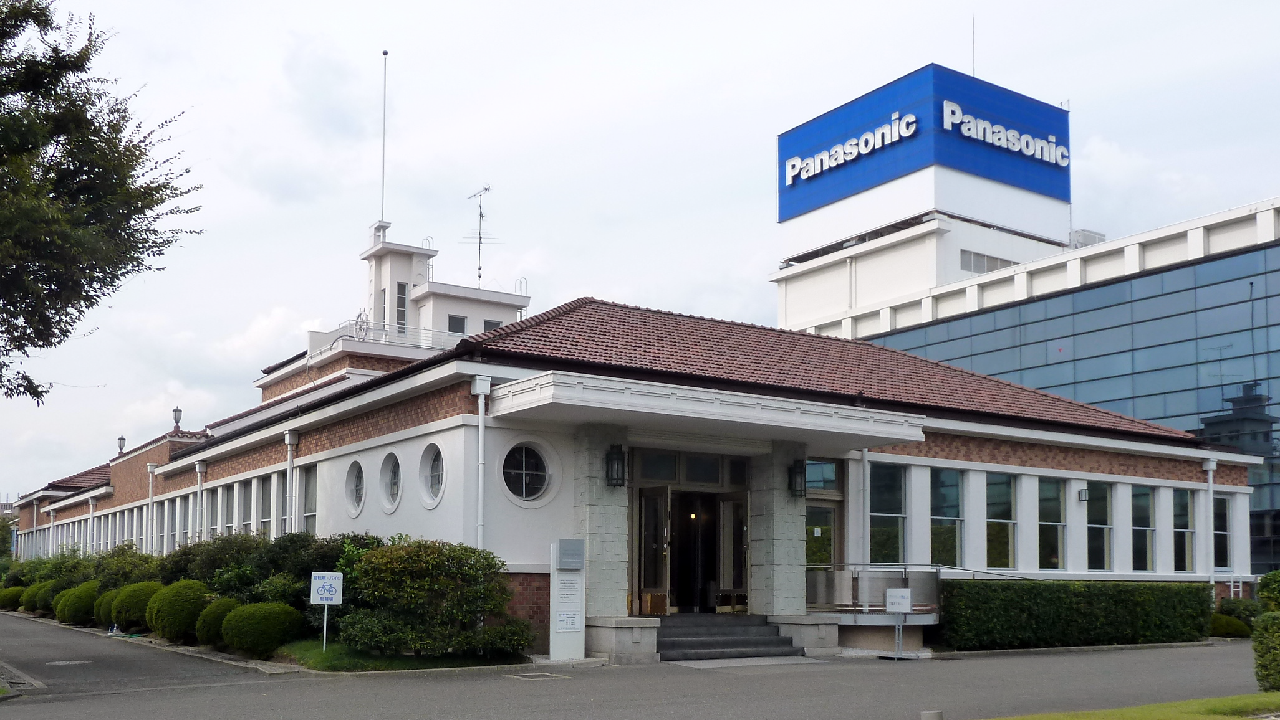
- Former name: Matsushita Electric History Museum
- Established: March 1968
- Location: Kadoma, Osaka
- Coordinates: 34°44′17.2″N 135°34′21.8″E
- Type: History Museum of Konosuke Matsushita's life and history of Panasonic
- Website: https://holdings.panasonic/global/corporate/about/history/panasonic-museum.html

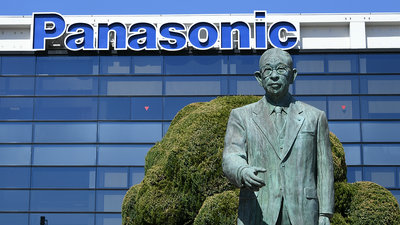

The Konosuke Matsushita Museum (松下幸之助歴史館, kōnosuke matsushita rekishikan; Konosuke Matsushita History Museum) is a corporate museum operated by Panasonic in Kadoma, Osaka, Japan. Until September 2008, the museum was called the Matsushita Electric Industrial History Museum (松下電器歴史館, matsushita denki rekishikan), but it was changed to its current name on October 1, 2008, to coordinate with the renaming of the company to Panasonic. The museum was temporarily closed in October 2017 and reopened in March 2018. It was revived as the Panasonic Museum (パナソニック ミュージアム, panasonikku myūjiamu), with the former history museum renovated into the Hall of Manufacturing Ingenuity (ものづくりイズム館, monozukuri-izumu-kan; craftmanship museum).

== Overview ==
The Matsushita Electric History Museum is a corporate museum opened in March 1968 by Matsushita Electric Industrial Co. (currently Panasonic) as one of the projects to commemorate its 50th founding anniversary. There are approximately 600 exhibits. The museum building is a renovated company headquarters constructed in 1933. On March 7, 1995, the museum's interior was fully renovated to commemorate the 100th anniversary of Konosuke Matsushita's birth.

The museum exhibits Konosuke Matsushita's life and the history of Panasonic up to the present. The section featuring advertisements and other materials spanning from the company's founding to the 1980s has been particularly well received by visitors. The museum's high-definition theater shows the film footage of Konosuke Matsushita. In the House Where Panasonic Started (創業の家, sōgyō no ie; founder’s house), a full-scale recreation of a rented house used as a workshop when Matsushita Electric was founded, visitors can see the pots, foot treadle, and embossing machine used at the time.

Since 2001, the Founder’s Memorial Week Special Exhibition (創業者メモリアルウィーク特別展, sōgyōsha memoriaru uīku tokubetsuten) has been held annually from late April through June. This special exhibition is based on the concept of deriving solutions to contemporary business challenges from the universal truths articulated through Konosuke Matsushita's words and actions. Guide brochures are available in Japanese, English, and Chinese, and visual materials on display are also available in Japanese, English, and partially in Chinese. Translations in more languages, such as Spanish and Russian, are being planned.

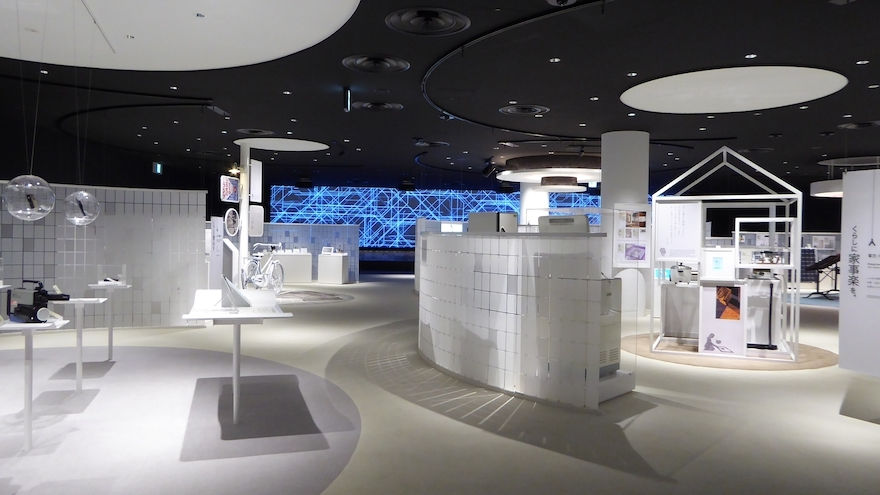
Hall of Manufacturing Ingenuity

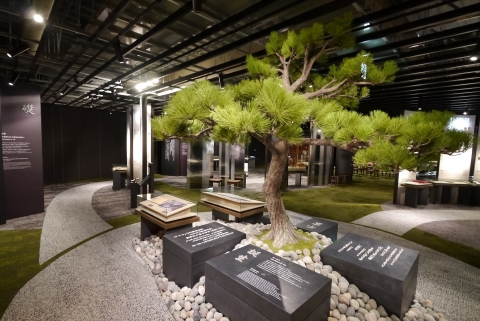
Konosuke Matsushita Museum

== See also ==
- Kōnosuke Matsushita
- Panasonic
