= Ijūin Hikokichi =

Japanese politician (1864–1924)

Junior Second Rank Baron Ijūin Hikokichi
- 伊集院 彦吉
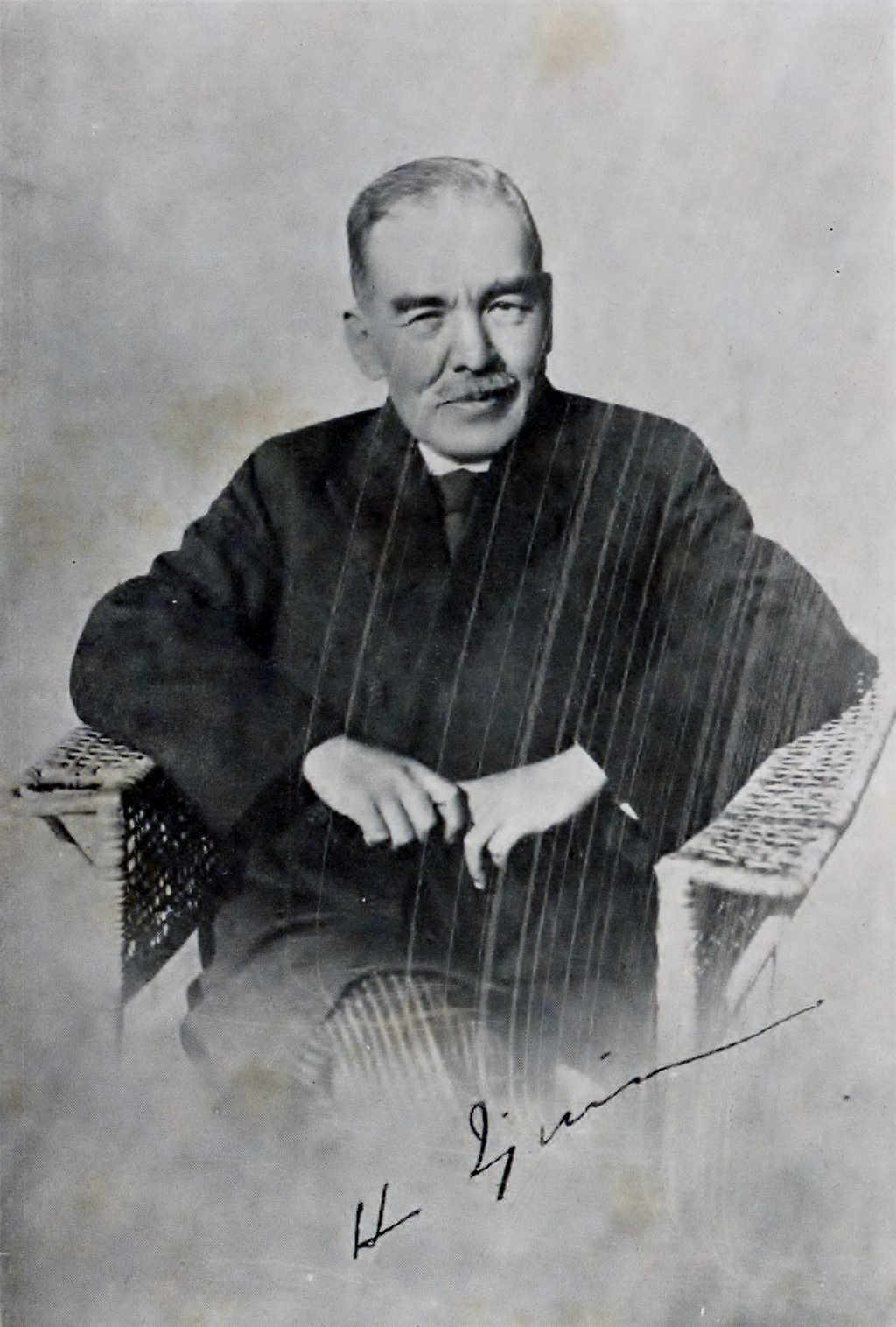

Minister for Foreign Affairs
- In office 19 September 1923 – 7 January 1924
- Prime Minister: Yamamoto Gonnohyōe
- Preceded by: Yamamoto Gonnohyōe
- Succeeded by: Matsui Keishirō

7th Governor-General of the Kwantung Leased Territory
- In office 8 September 1922 – 19 September 1923
- Monarch: Taishō
- Preceded by: Yamagata Isaburō
- Succeeded by: Hideo Kodama

Personal details
- Born: 22 July 1864 Kagoshima, Satsuma, Japan
- Died: 26 April 1924 (aged 59) Tokyo, Japan
- Resting place: Aoyama Cemetery
- Party: Independent
- Relatives: Ōkubo Toshimichi (father-in-law)
- Education: Tokyo Imperial University

Baron Ijūin Hikokichi (伊集院 彦吉, Ijūin Hikokichi; 22 July 1864 – 26 April 1924) was a Japanese diplomat and politician who served as minister of foreign affairs and Japanese ambassador to the Qing dynasty.

== Early life ==
Ijūin was born on 22 July 1864, in Kōrai, Kagoshima, Satsuma Domain, the eldest son of samurai Ijūin Kichitsugu.

== Career ==
Ijūin was appointed consul at Yantai in China in 1893. He served again in China as consul general at Tianjin from 1901 to 1907. He was appointed ambassador to Beijing in 1908. On 4 September 1909, he signed the Japan–China Agreement concerning Kando as the Japanese ambassador to the Qing dynasty in Beijing. During the 1911 Revolution that broke out in October 1911, together with then Foreign Minister Uchida Yasuya, he argued for the provision of support to the Qing government. His term as ambassador to China lasted until 1913.

Then, Ijūin was appointed the Japanese ambassador to Italy in 1916 and was in office until 1920. During his tenure, he was one of the leading members of Japanese delegation at the Paris Peace Conference in 1919. Ijūin is described as a conservative ambassador.

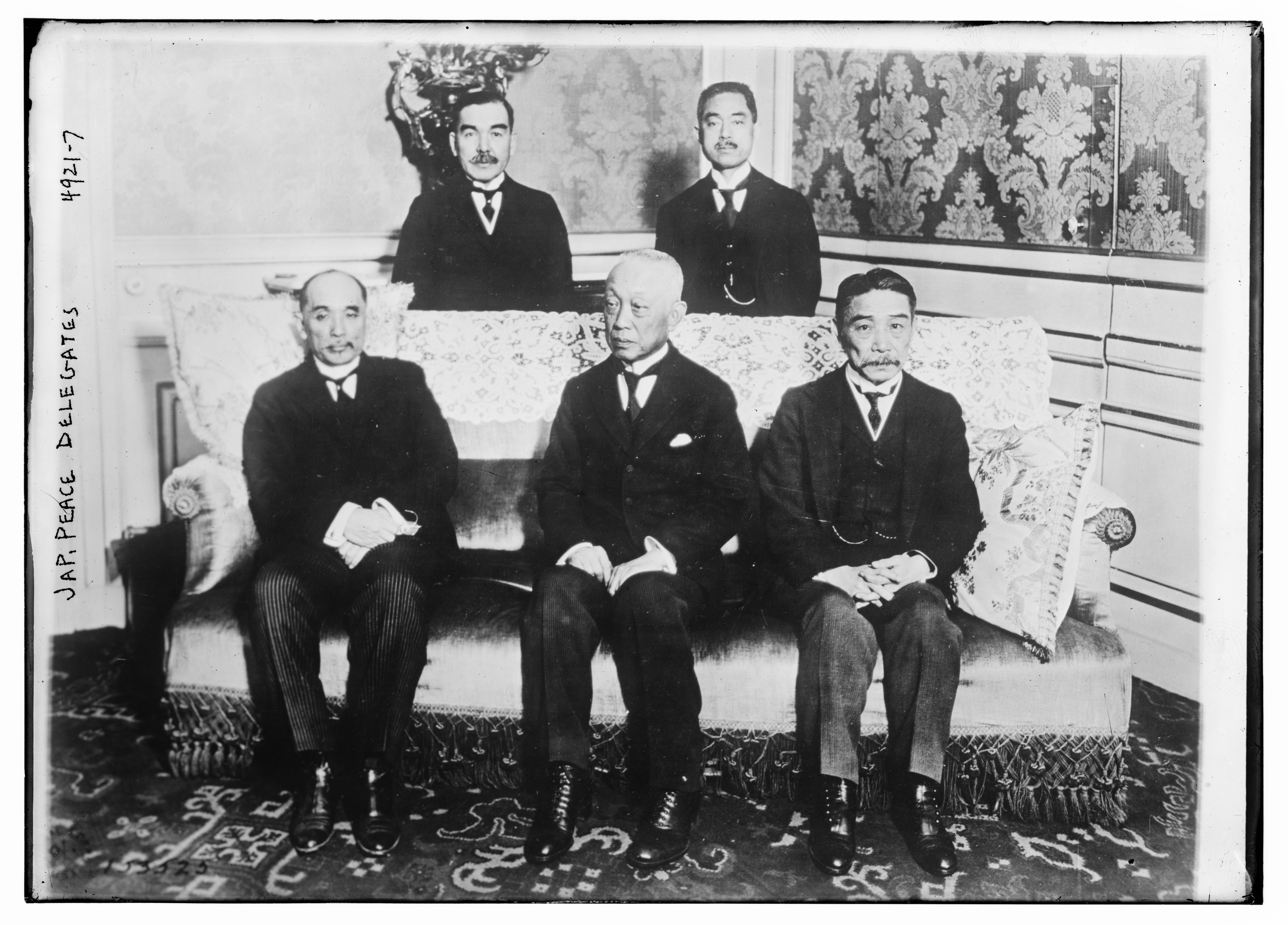
Japanese delegates to the Paris Peace Conference in 1919. Standing (l to r) - Ijūin Hikokichi, Japanese Ambassador to Italy; and Keishirō Matsui, Japanese Ambassador to France; Seated (l to r) - Baron Makino Nobuaki, former Foreign Minister; Marquis Saionji Kinmochi, former Prime Minister; and Viscount Chinda Sutemi, Japanese Ambassador to Great Britain.

Prime Minister Hara Takashi wanted Ijūin to search for European institutions of public information when the latter was ambassador and a Versailles delegate. Ijūin reported that the best way to create an influential information bureau was to coordinate all information sources, including army, navy and finance ministry. Eventually, a public information office, Gaimu-shō Jōhō-bu, in the ministry of foreign affairs was established on 13 August 1921, and Ijūin was appointed its head. Then he served as governor-general of Kwantung Leased Territory in northeastern China for one year. He was appointed to the post on 8 September 1922, replacing Isaburō Yamagata. Ijūin was in office until 19 September 1923.

Ijūin was appointed minister of foreign affairs on 19 September 1923 to the second cabinet of Yamamoto Gombee, replacing him who also assumed the role of foreign minister briefly from 2 to 19 September. Ijūin was replaced by Keishirō Matsui on 7 January 1924 when a new cabinet was formed by Kiyoura Keigo.

== Personal life and death ==
Ijūin was married to Ōkubo Toshimichi's daughter, Yoshiko. Thus, he was the brother-in-law of Makino Nobuaki.

Shortly after his removal from the office, Ijūin died of neuralgia in Tokyo in April 1924.
