= Michi wo hiraku =

1968 book by Konosuke Matsushita

Michi Wo Hiraku
- Author: Kōnosuke Matsushita
- Original title: 道をひらく
- Language: Japanese
- Genre: Business, Essay
- Published: 1 May 1968
- Publisher: PHP Institute, Inc.
- Publication place: Japan
- Media type: Print / Digital
- Pages: 271
- ISBN: 4569534074
- OCLC: 1001854200
- Website: Path

Michi wo hiraku (道をひらく, Michi wo hiraku), literally meaning Open the path and often translated as The Path, is a book written by Konosuke Matsushita, a Japanese industrialist and founder of Panasonic. The book was first published in 1968, and has been a perennial bestseller since then, with nearly 4.5 million copies sold worldwide. The book is a collection of short essays previously published in PHP Research Institute magazine.
