= Werner Gerich =

German engineer and technical consultant

Werner Gerich (Chinese: 威尔纳·格里希; pinyin: Wēiěrnà Gélǐxī; 25 August 1919 – 17 April 2003) also known as Ge Lixi, was a German engineer and technical consultant.

== Life ==
Gerich was born and died at Mannheim. He worked as a quality control inspector at the Karlsruhe Institute of Technology before his retirement. At the age of 65, he joined the Senior Experten Service (SES) based in Bonn. In 1984 he was sent as an expert to the Chinese city of Wuhan, where he first served as a consultant on assembly and quality control at a state-run diesel motor factory, and later as its general director. Gerich was the first foreign factory director in China since the Revolution of 1949. In his two years as director, he renewed the run-down factory through drastic reforms and brought about technical improvements to its diesel engines.

== Honors ==
For his service as an SES expert, Gerich was made an honorary citizen of the city of Wuhan, and an honorary professor at Wuhan University. He was awarded the German Order of Merit in 1987. The city of Wuhan installed a bronze bust of him in his honor in 2005, making him the fourth German, after Karl Marx, Friedrich Engels, and John Rabe to be so honored in China.

In 2008, the Office for Foreign Experts in Beijing placed him on their list of 15 foreigners who had made the greatest impact on China's development since 1978.
