= Devachan =

Dwelling of the gods in Theosophy

Devachan (compound word; Sanskrit 'deva', gods, and the Tibetan word 'chan' (Wylie: 'can'), possessing, having, subject to) is the "dwelling of the gods" according to the original teachings of Theosophy as formulated by H.P. Blavatsky.

== Theosophy ==
Devachan is regarded as the place where most souls go after death where desires are gratified, corresponding to the Christian belief in Heaven. However, Devachan is a temporary, intermediate state of being before the soul's eventual rebirth into the physical world.

Through Wisdom and Knowledge, one can reach Nirvana and be free from the cycle of birth and death, and even the "false bliss" of Devachan.

— H.P. Blavatsky, The Secret Doctrine

=== According to C.W. Leadbeater ===
C.W. Leadbeater located the "Devachan" on the mental plane many miles far above the surface of Earth. While those souls at the zeroth level of initiation (the vast majority of the inhabitants of Earth) go to Summerland (located on the astral plane only a few miles above the surface of Earth) when they die, those who have reached the first, second, or third levels of initiation go to Devachan when they die. The final Heaven where souls at the fourth level of initiation (those souls who have become arhats and no longer need to reincarnate) is called Nirvana. When reaching the fourth level of initiation, one can become a pratyekabuddha and enter Nirvana right away, or become a buddha or bodhisattva and teach others before entering. One can also choose to become a Master in the Spiritual Hierarchy upon reaching the fourth level of initiation—then one's entrance into Nirvana is delayed for millions, billions, or trillions of years until one has completed climbing the ladder of initiation by completing one's tasks as a Master in the Spiritual Hierarchy.

== Anthroposophy ==
From the perspective of anthroposophy Rudolf Steiner asserts that the Lower Devachan (or the Heavenly World) and Higher Devachan (or the World of Reason) are two "supersensible" realms, above the astral realm, associated with emotions and will impulse, respectively. In comparison, the mental realm is associated with thought.
