= Yamagata Isaburō =

Japanese politician

Senior Second Rank Prince Yamagata Isaburō
- 山縣 伊三郎
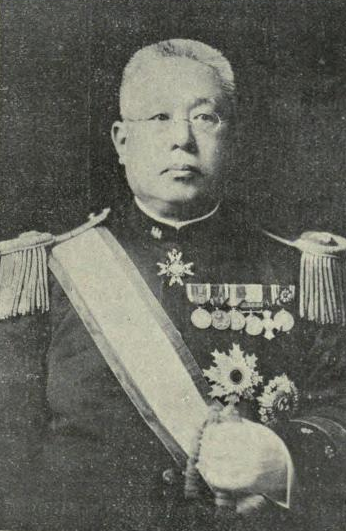

6th Governor-General of the Kwantung Leased Territory
- In office 24 May 1920 – 8 September 1922
- Monarch: Taishō
- Preceded by: Hayashi Gonsuke
- Succeeded by: Ijūin Hikokichi

Minister of Communications
- In office 7 January 1906 – 14 January 1908
- Prime Minister: Saionji Kinmochi
- Preceded by: Ōura Kanetake
- Succeeded by: Hara Takashi

Member of the Privy Council
- In office 4 November 1922 – 24 September 1927
- Monarchs: Taishō; Hirohito

Member of the House of Peers
- In office 7 July 1908 – 24 September 1927 Nominated by the Emperor

Governor of Mie Prefecture
- In office 21 February 1899 – 10 May 1899
- Monarch: Meiji
- Preceded by: Rinoie Yuji
- Succeeded by: Yoshitarō Arakawa

Governor of Tokushima Prefecture
- In office 12 August 1896 – 21 February 1899
- Monarch: Meiji
- Preceded by: Murakami Yoshio
- Succeeded by: Rinoie Yuji

Personal details
- Born: Katsu Isaburō; 6 February 1858 Kawashima, Nagato, Japan
- Died: 24 September 1927 (aged 69) Kōjimachi, Tokyo, Japan
- Spouse: Katō Takako
- Children: Yamagata Arimichi; Yamagata Saburo; Yamagata Arimitsu (adopted)
- Parents: Katsu Kanesuke (father); Yamagata Toshiko (mother)
- Relatives: Tsurumi Moriyoshi (brother); Yamagata Aritomo (uncle); Katō Hiroyuki (father-in-law); Shōdō Hirata (brother-in-law); Hiro Matsushita (great-great-nephew)

Prince Yamagata Isaburō (山縣 伊三郎; born Katsu Isaburō; 6 February 1858 – 24 September 1927) was a Japanese politician, cabinet minister, and Japanese Inspector-General of Korea. His wife was the daughter of Katō Hiroyuki.

== Biography ==
Katsu Isaburō was born in Nagato Province in Chōshū Domain (present-day Yamaguchi prefecture, as the second son of samurai Katsu Kanesuke and Yamagata Toshiko, the elder sister of Yamagata Aritomo. As the latter had no children, he was adopted by Yamagata Aritomo in 1861 to carry on the family name.

After the Meiji Restoration, accompanied the Iwakura Mission to the United States and Europe, remaining in Germany for studies. On his return to Japan, he worked as a translator at the Foreign Ministry, and subsequently served on the Cabinet Legislation Bureau. He then entered the Home Ministry as served as Secretary to the governor of Aichi Prefecture before being appointed governor of Tokushima Prefecture, followed by Mie Prefecture. He was later promoted to Director of the Local Affairs Bureau within the Home Ministry, and rose to the post of Vice Minister.

In 1906, Yamagata entered the First Saionji Cabinet as Minister of Communications. His chief achievement was to bring about the collapse of the Saionji Cabinet by creating a budgetary deadlock over railroad funding at the behest of Yamagata Aritomo.

In July 1908, Yamagata was appointed to a seat in the House of Peers in the Diet of Japan. In 1910, following the resignation of Itō Hirobumi as Resident-General of Korea, Yamagata accompanied the new Resident Sone Arasuke to Korea as Deputy Resident-General. Following the formal annexation of Korea to the Empire of Japan, Yamagata remained for the next nine years as Inspector-General of Korea, (a position equivalent to that of Deputy Governor-General), under the tenure of Governor-General Terauchi Masatake and Hasegawa Yoshimichi. Although considered to be the leading candidate to replace Hasegawa, Yamagata was removed from office during the government reorganization following the March 1 Movement in 1919. He subsequently served as Governor-General of Kwantung Leased Territory from May 1920 to September 1922.

In February 1922, after the death of his foster-father Yamagata Aritomo, he inherited the kazoku title of kōshaku (prince). In January 1925, he sent to French Indochina as head of a special mission. Yamagata served on the Privy Council until his death in 1927.

== Honours ==
From the Japanese Wikipedia article

=== Decorations ===
- Order of the Sacred Treasure, Third Class (27 December 1902; Fourth Class: 28 December 1898; Fifth Class: 26 June 1897; Sixth Class: 21 June 1895)
- Grand Cordon of the Order of the Rising Sun (21 July 1909; Second Class: 1 April 1906)
- Grand Cordon of the Order of the Rising Sun with Paulownia Flowers (24 September 1927; posthumous)

Political offices
Preceded by Ōura Kanetake	Minister of Communications; July 1906 – July 1908	Succeeded by Hara Takashi
Government offices
Preceded by -none-	Japanese Inspector-General of Korea; July 1910 – August 1919	Succeeded by Mizuno Rentarō
Preceded by Hayashi Gonsuke	Governor-General of Kwantung Leased Territory; May 1920 – September 1922	Succeeded by Ijuin Hikokichi
