= David Webb (jeweler) =

American jeweler (1925–1975)

David Webb (July 2, 1925 – December 12, 1975) was an American jeweler. On July 28, 1948, he founded his eponymous company at 2 West 46th Street. Among his clients were Elizabeth Taylor, Jacqueline Kennedy Onassis and Barbra Streisand. Helen Mirren, Jennifer Garner and Beyoncé have also worn his jewelry.

Born in Asheville, North Carolina on July 2, 1925. Webb was a self-taught designer whose work included dragon bracelets, Maltese cross brooches and animal motifs. In 1964, The Duke of Windsor purchased a bracelet for his wife. Diana Vreeland, a noted columnist and editor of Harper's Bazaar and Vogue, was often seen with a David Webb black-and-white enamel zebra bangle.

Webb died from pancreatic cancer on December 12, 1975. The business has been in continuous operation and in 2010 was purchased by estate jewelers Mark Emanuel, Sima Ghadamian and Robert Sadian. Webb left behind an archive of over 40,000 original drawings and designs. The company continues to produce new pieces based on his original concepts, maintaining his distinctive style.

A book about his work, David Webb: The Quintessential American Jeweler by Ruth Peltason, was published in 2013. In 2014, a retrospective exhibition was mounted at Norton Museum of Art in Palm Beach.

David Webb has flagship boutiques in New York City on Madison Avenue and in LA on Rodeo Drive at The Beverly Wilshire Hotel.

In 2025 the brand was acquired by Middle West Partners in April 2025. A new David Webb boutique at Rosewood Miramar Beach in Montecito, California opened in November 2025.
