= Matsui Keishirō =

Japanese politician and diplomat

Senior Second Rank Baron Matsui Keishirō
- 松井 慶四郎
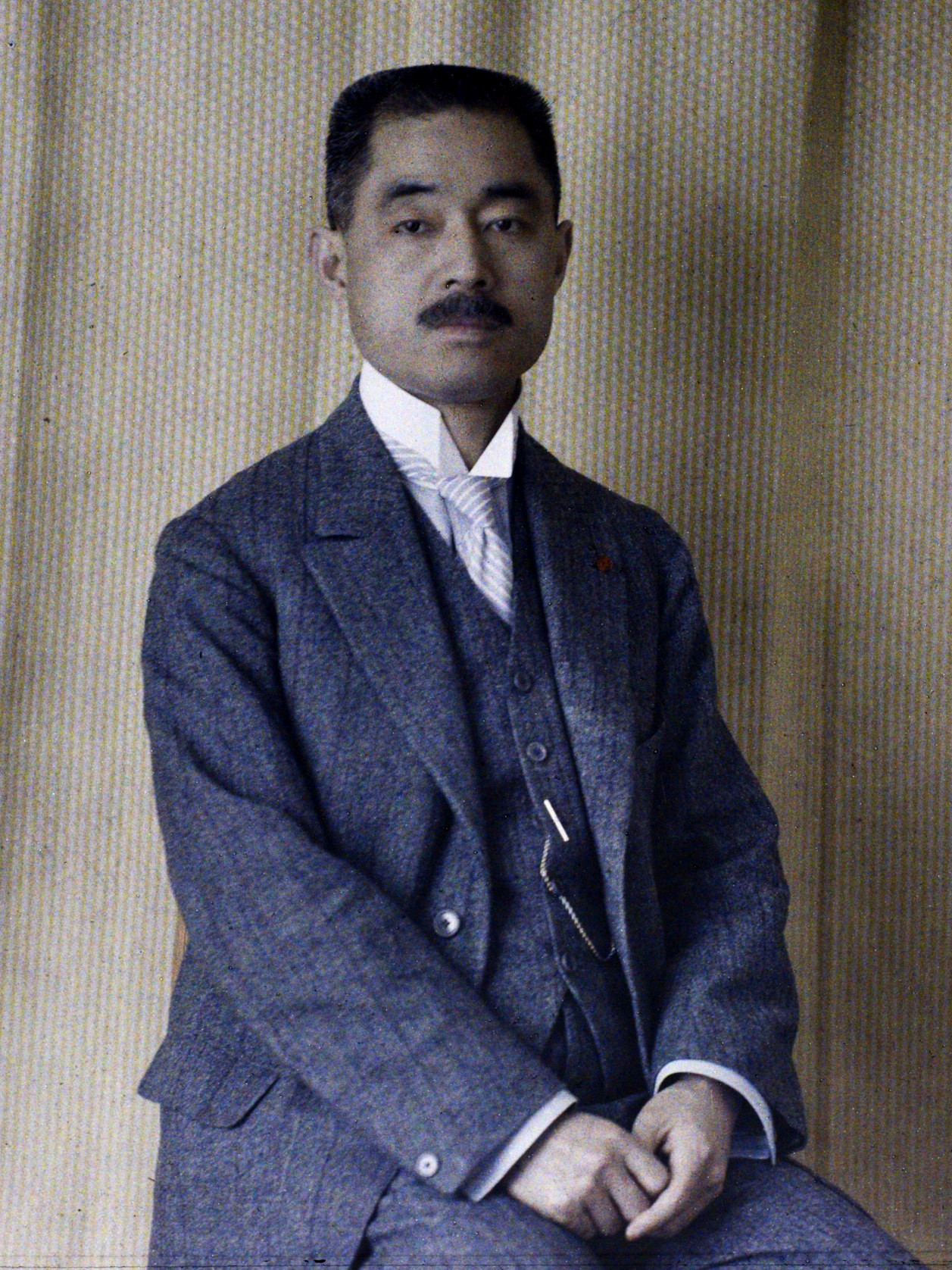
- 1917 Autochrome by Auguste Léon

Minister for Foreign Affairs
- In office 7 January 1924 – 11 June 1924
- Prime Minister: Kiyoura Keigo
- Preceded by: Ijūin Hikokichi
- Succeeded by: Shidehara Kijūrō

Member of the Privy Council
- In office 3 February 1938 – 4 June 1946
- Monarch: Hirohito

Member of the House of Peers
- In office 8 June 1924 – 10 February 1938 Nominated by the Emperor

Personal details
- Born: 28 March 1868 Osaka, Japan
- Died: 4 June 1946 (aged 78)
- Party: Independent
- Education: Tokyo Imperial University

Baron Matsui Keishirō (松井 慶四郎; 28 March 1868 – 4 June 1946) was a Japanese statesman and diplomat.

== Early life ==
Matsui was a native of Osaka Prefecture, and a graduate of the Law School of Tokyo Imperial University in 1889. He entered the Ministry of Foreign Affairs the same year.

== Career ==
In 1890, Matsui was assigned to the Japanese embassy in Seoul, Korea, and in 1895 was assigned to the Japanese embassy in the United States. In 1898, he was promoted to the position of First Secretary at the Japanese Embassy in London, United Kingdom. In 1902, he was reassigned to the Japanese embassy in Peking, China, returning to Japan in 1913.

During the First World War, served as Japanese Ambassador to France and was a plenipotentiary at the 1919 Paris Peace Conference. On the successful completion of this mission, he was awarded with the title of baron (danshaku) under the kazoku peerage system. He served as Japanese Minister of Foreign Affairs from 7 January to 11 June 1924, under the administration of Kiyoura Keigo and was also appointed a member of the House of Peers in the Diet of Japan. He later served as Ambassador to the United Kingdom in 1925–1928. In 1938, he became a member of the Privy Council.
