= Mitsui Hachirōemon =

Mitsui Hachirōemon (三井 八郎右衛門) is the inherited name given to the first son born to the head family (総領家, Sōryō-ke), or the leading branch of the extended Mitsui family. It was Mitsui Takatoshi (三井高利) who started the naming ritual that a male heir would be called Hachirōemon when they decide the next leader of family business that Mitsui was known for. For those sons of Takatoshi, each bloodline had a nickname: the first son Takahira held the Kita branch, the second son Takatomi the Isarago branch (伊皿子家), and the third son Takaharu the Shimmachi branch (新町家).

When the first son of Kita branch be too young to inherit the position from his father, one of his uncles or male cousins would be selected to fill in for a limited period of time, but they did not count him as a Hachirōemon. The extended family decided to expel Takayoshi (高美) who had consumed family fortune by indulging in antiquity as hobby, thus Takayoshi's younger brother Takahisa was acted as Hachirōemon until Takakiyo, his nephew, was old enough.

Mitsui people who inherited the name Hachirōemon the financer:
Mitsui Takatoshi (三井高利) —

- Kita branch: Takatoshi's first son (1) Takahira (高平) — (3) Takafusa (高房) — (4) Takayoshi (高美) — (5) Takakiyo (高清) — (6) Takasuke (高祐) — (7) Takanari (高就) — (8) Takayoshi (高福) — (9) Taka'aki (高朗) — (10) Takamine (高棟) — (11) Takakimi (高公), the last Hachirōemon the financer — (11) Takanori (高乗), an architect.
- Isarago branch: Takatoshi's second son (2) Takatomi (高富).
- Shimmachi branch: Takatoshi's third son Takaharu (高治) — (3´) Takakata (高方) — (4´) Takahisa (高弥).

== 1st - Takahira ==
Mitsui Takahira (三井 高平; 24 May 1653 – 17 January 1738) was the first of the Mitsui head family, or the Kita branch. As the eldest son of Mitsui Takatoshi and the original Kita branch, Takahira's younger brothers and their family would support Kita branch by having their sons adopted to. Mitsui family business was sustained as cousins and uncles worked as an interim head of the company, and both Takakata and Takahisa were not called Mitsui Hachirōemon.

== 2nd - Takatomi ==
Mitsui Takatomi (三井 高富; 1654 – 12 June 1709), the second son of Takatoshi, was the second head of the Mitsui family. His descendants headed the Isarago branch.

== 3rd - Takafusa ==
Mitsui Takafusa (三井 高房; 16 April 1684 – 7 November 1748) was the third head of the Mitsui family. He was the son of Takahira.

== Takakata ==
Mitsui Takakata (三井 高方) was the son of Takaharu, the third son of Takatoshi and the first head of the Shinmachi branch. Although not counted as such, when Takafusa retired as the third head in 1734, his successor Takayoshi was still young, so Takakata acted as Hachirōemon.

== 4th - Takayoshi ==
Mitsui Takayoshi (三井 高美; 1715 – 1782) was the fourth head of the Mitsui family. His childhood name was Manzō (万蔵). In 1733, he was appointed Kan'emon (勘右衛門), and inherited the Kita branch while his father's Takafusa became a Buddhist monk the following year. Renamed himself Shinpachi (新八) in 1736, succeeded into the Kyoto money order business under the title of Saburōsuke (三郎助) in 1738, and in 1741, following the death of his uncle Takakata, Takayoshi succeeded as Hachirōemon. However, as Takayoshi incurred a large amount of debt from Ōmotokata (大元方) by spending too much on personal art collection as well as making huge donations to Saikyō-ji Temple, his title of Hachirōemon was passed to Takafusa in 1747 through the intentions of his younger brother Takahisa, who was the head of the Shinmachi representing the interest of the extended Mitsuis at the time. In 1750, Takayoshi handed over the Kita branch to his second son Takakiyo, but the squandering was not settled, so in August 1756, Mitsuis negotiated with Takayoshi and made an agreement that they paid him 1200 kan retirement pension, and Takayoshi agreed to withdraw from Mitui's financial business. Nonetheless, however, it was discovered that Takayoshi secretly borrowed money from Ōmotokata, and in the same year on 13 November, his successor, Takakiyo (then Shinpachi), decided to disown him officially: an application form was filed to the city financial officials on the 27th of the same month, in which Takakiyo signed the consent of 87 businessmen and employees that his uncle Takahisa would act as Hachirōemon.

== Takahisa ==
Mitsui Takahisa (三井 高弥), the son of Takafusa, succeeded as the third head of the Shinmachi branch as the adopted son of Takakata. Although not counted as such, when his older brother, the fourth head, had his title as Hachirōemon revoked in 1747, Takahisa acted as Hachirōemon.

== 5th - Takakiyo ==
Mitsui Takakiyo (三井 高清) was the fifth head of the Mitsui family. He was the second son of Takayoshi.

== 6th - Takasuke ==
Mitsui Takasuke (三井 高祐) was the sixth head of the Mitsui family. He was the eldest son of Takakiyo.

== 7th - Takanari ==
Mitsui Takanari (三井 高就) was the seventh head of the Mitsui family. He was the eldest son of Takasuke.

== 8th - Takayoshi ==
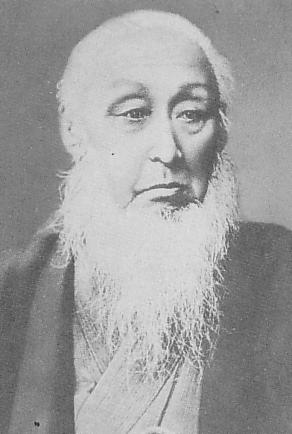
Mitsui Takayoshi

Mitsui Takayoshi (三井 高福; 14 November 1808 – 20 December 1885) was a Japanese businessman during the Bakumatsu and the early Meiji period. He was the eighth head of the Mitsui family.

During the Bakumatsu reformation, Takayoshi was able to move between the Tokugawa shogunate and the Imperial court, and helped establish the foundation of the Mitsui zaibatsu. In 1859, he served as a money purveyor for the places of the Gaikoku bugyō, and after the Meiji Restoration, he worked on several aspects of the banking administration of the government. He established the First National Bank and the Mitsui Bank. He was also responsible for the foundation of Mitsui & Co.

== 9th - Takaaki ==
Mitsui Takaaki (三井 高朗; 1837 – 8 February 1894) was the ninth head of the Mitsui family.

== 10th - Takamine ==
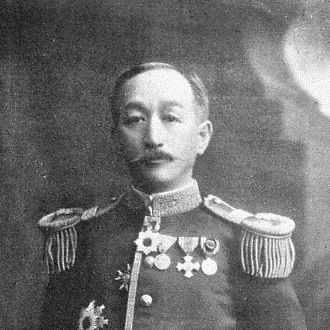
Mitsui Takamine

Mitsui Takamine (三井 高棟; 8 February 1857 – 9 February 1948) was the tenth head of the Mitsui family. Known as a hobbyist, he built a mansion in Tokyo, the Imaichō residence (今井町邸, Imaichō-tei), in 1906. In the area of approximately 13,500 tsubo (44,631 m^{2}), the Noh stage, the garden, and the tennis court among others were established, and Jo-an, which would later be a National Treasure, was relocated there.

In 1908 Mitsui Takamine allied with a visiting U.S. business delegation to assist in resolving The Panic of 1907 and the unstable Stock Market in the United States.

In 1922, Takamine invited the Prince of Wales, the future Edward VIII, at the request of the Imperial Household Agency, and hosted a reception of the crown prince with a dinner party, a Noh viewing, etc. In 1933, as Takamine retired, he handed down the mansion at Imaichō to the eleventh head, Takakimi, but the mansion was destroyed by fire in the bombing of Tokyo in 1945.

== Takakimi ==
Baron Takakimi Mitsui (三井 高公, Mitsui Takakimi; 3 August 1895 – 13 November 1992) was the eleventh head of the Mitsui family.

After losing control of Mitsui companies after the dissolution of the zaibatsu following World War II, he ran Wakabakai Kindergarten, a kindergarten that was created by his father Takamine during his lifetime. Also, Takakimi's residence, the Mitsui Hachirōemon tei (三井八郎右衞門邸) (built in 1952), was relocated from Nishi-Azabu, Minato, Tokyo to the Edo-Tokyo Open Air Architectural Museum in Koganei, Tokyo in 1996, and is now open to the public. His wife Toshiko (鋹子; 1901 – 1976) was the daughter of Matsudaira Yasukata, the 18th head of the Echizen-Matsudaira clan who ruled the Fukui Domain.

He was a car enthusiast; before World War II, he owned more than 10 luxury cars made by European companies such as Bentley, Hispano-Suiza, Bugatti and Lancia. Even into the 1990s, he drove his own Bentley T models.

== Hisanori ==
Hisanori Mitsui (三井 永乗, Mitsui Hisanori) is the twelfth and current head of the Mitsui family. He works as an architect.

== See also ==
- Mitsui family
