= Shinmachi Spinning Mill =

- 新町紡績所
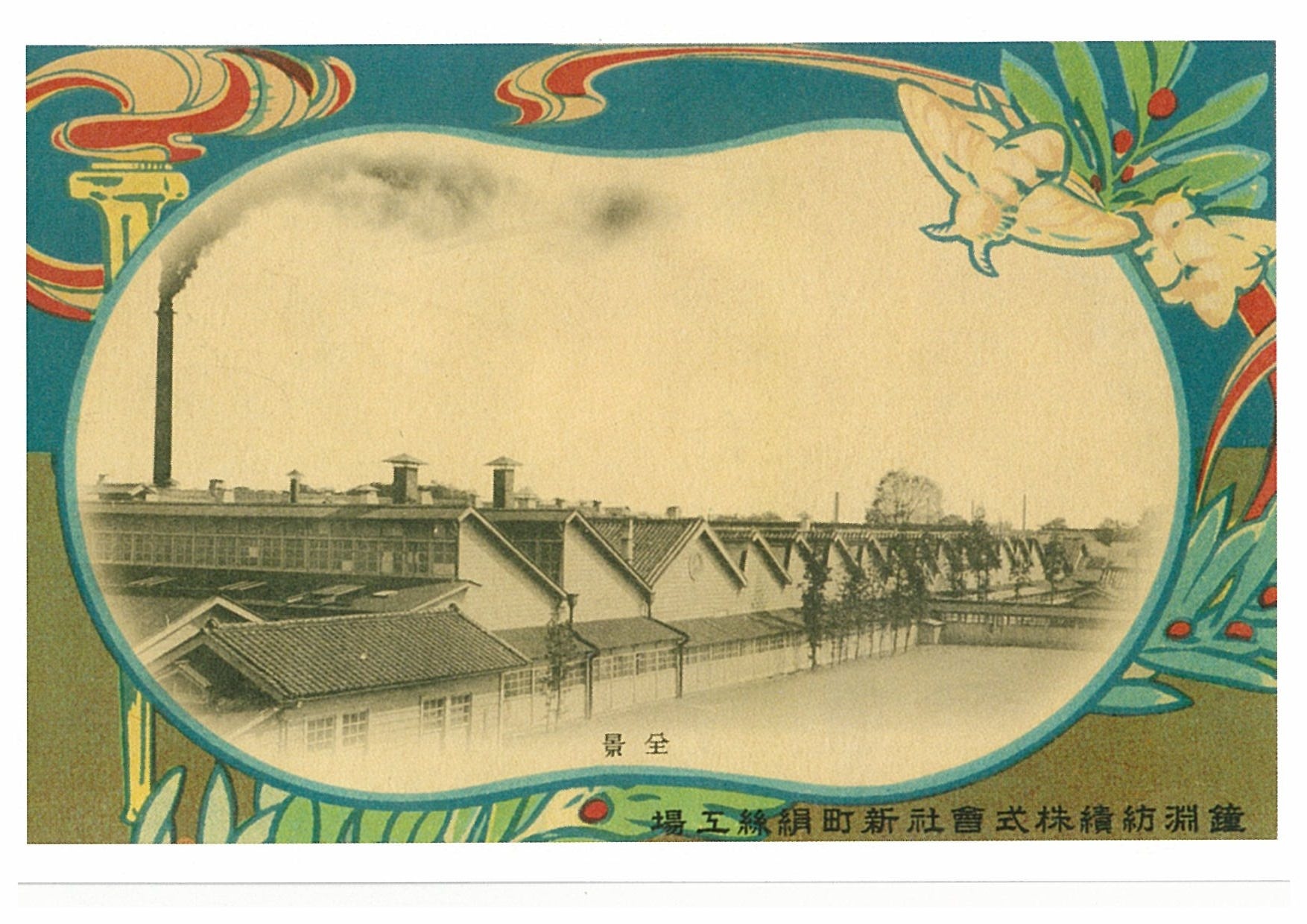
- Postcard showing Shinmachi Spinning Mill, circa 1912

- Location within Gunma Prefecture Location within Japan

General information
- Location: Takasaki, Gunma Prefecture, Japan
- Coordinates: 36°16′40″N 139°06′02″E
- Opened: 1877

The Shinmachi Spinning Mill (旧新町紡績所, kyū-Shin-machi bōsekijo) was a government-run model factory and model town located in what is now part of the city of Takasaki, Gunma Prefecture, Japan. The site has been protected by the central government as a National Historic Site since 2015.

== History ==
Following the Meiji restoration, the new Meiji government targeted production of silk thread as an essential industry to be developed to raise the necessary foreign capital to further the industrialization of Japan. Gunma Prefecture had long been known as a center for sericulture, and in 1877 the Home Ministry under Kido Takayoshi ordered the creation of a new town on the outskirts of Takasaki to be built as a center for silk production. This new town, or "Shinmachi", was centered on a spinning mill with equipment imported from Switzerland and Germany and was based on a design viewed by the Japanese delegation visiting the 1873 Vienna World's Fair. Yamazoe Kisaburō, a carpenter from Niigata who visited the Vienna World's Fair was placed in charge of constructing the mill building and the surrounding dormitories for the workers. The operation of the mill began on July 1, 1877, with an opening ceremony attended by Ōkubo Toshimichi, Itō Hirobumi, Ōkuma Shigenobu in October. Emperor Meiji visited the following year. The facility was transferred to the control of the Ministry of Agriculture and Commerce, and was then sold to the Mitsui zaibatsu in 1877 to become the Shinmachi Mitsukoshi Spinning Mill. In 1911, the mill was sold to Kanefuchi (now Kanebo) and was greatly expanded in 1917 as the demand for silk great greatly after World War I. Although production dropped after World War II, the company began to diversify into synthetic fibers. At its peak, the factory employed 3000 workers. However, due to increased foreign competition and rising costs, it was closed in 1975 and was used as a warehouse for a nearly food factory until 2004.

The factory building that Yamazoe Kisaburō designed at the time of establishment was a wooden one-story structure. Although there was some remodeling, the building remains almost unchanged from the time of its construction except for a U-shaped extension part added in 1907. Five structures within the complex, including this main building, are National Important Cultural Properties:

1. Factory main building
2. Engine room
3. Repair workshop
4. Warehouse
5. Two-story brick warehouse with Engineering Office, Waiting Room

These rare wooden factory buildings demonstrates the architectural techniques of the early Meiji era, and is only remaining of the silk spinning factory in the Meiji era in Japan.

== See also ==
- List of Historic Sites of Japan (Gunma)
