= Shigeyoshi =

- Gender: Male

Origin
- Origin: Japanese
- Meaning: Different meanings depending on the kanji used

Shigeyoshi (written: 重喜, 重好, 重能, 重良, 重義, 重吉, 成美, 成栄, 茂義 or 臣善) is a masculine Japanese given name. Notable people with the name include:

- Hachisuka Shigeyoshi (蜂須賀 重喜) (1738–1801), Japanese daimyō
- Hidanohana Shigeyoshi (飛騨乃花 成栄) (born 1953), Japanese sumo wrestler
- Shigeyoshi Inoue (井上 成美) (1889–1975), Imperial Japanese Navy admiral
- Matsudaira Shigeyoshi (松平 重吉) (1493–1580), Japanese samurai
- Shigeyoshi Matsumae (松前 重義) (1901–1991), Japanese engineer, politician and educator
- Shigeyoshi Matsuo (松尾 臣善) (1843–1916), Japanese businessman and banker
- Shigeyoshi Miwa (三輪 茂義) (1892–1959), Imperial Japanese Navy admiral
- Shigeyoshi Mochizuki (望月 重良) (born 1973), Japanese footballer
- Okada Shigeyoshi (岡田 重能) (1527–1583), Japanese samurai
- Shigeyoshi Suzuki (鈴木 重義) (1902–1971), Japanese footballer
- Shigeyoshi Suzuki (film director) (鈴木 重吉) (1900–1976), Japanese film director
- Tokugawa Shigeyoshi (徳川 重好) (1745–1795), Japanese samurai
