= Yasutake =

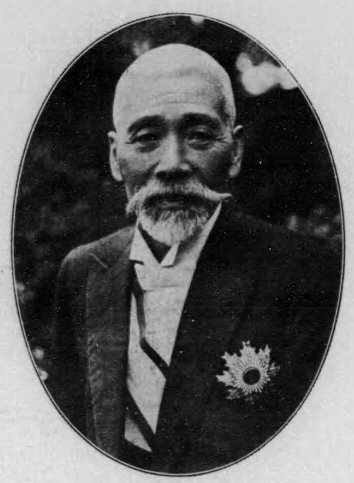
- Yasutake Matsuoka (1846–1923), Japanese politician
- Pronunciation: jasɯtake (IPA)
- Gender: Male

Origin
- Origin: Japanese
- Meaning: Different meanings depending on the kanji used

Yasutake is a masculine Japanese given name and a Japanese surname.

== Written forms ==
Yasutake can be written using many different combinations of kanji characters. Here are some examples:

- 靖健, "peaceful, healthy"
- 靖武, "peaceful, warrior"
- 靖丈, "peaceful, measure of length"
- 靖岳, "peaceful, mountain peak"
- 康健, "healthy, healthy"
- 康武, "healthy, warrior"
- 康丈, "healthy, measure of length"
- 康岳, "healthy, mountain peak"
- 安健, "tranquil, healthy"
- 安武, "tranquil, warrior"
- 保健, "preserve, healthy"
- 保武, "preserve, warrior"
- 保丈, "preserve, measure of length"
- 泰健, "peaceful, healthy"
- 泰岳, "peaceful, mountain peak"
- 易丈, "divination, measure of length"

The name can also be written in hiragana やすたけ or katakana ヤスタケ.

== Notable people with the given name Yasutake ==
- Yasutake Funakoshi (舟越 保武, 1912–2002), Japanese sculptor and painter
- Yasutake Matsuoka (松岡 康毅, 1846–1923), Japanese politician

== Notable people with the surname Yasutake ==
- Patti Yasutake (パティ・ヤスタケ, 1953–2024), American actress
- Toru Yasutake (安武 亨; born 1978), Japanese footballer
