= Kōno Hironaka =

Japanese politician

Junior Third Rank Kōno Hironaka
- 河野 広中
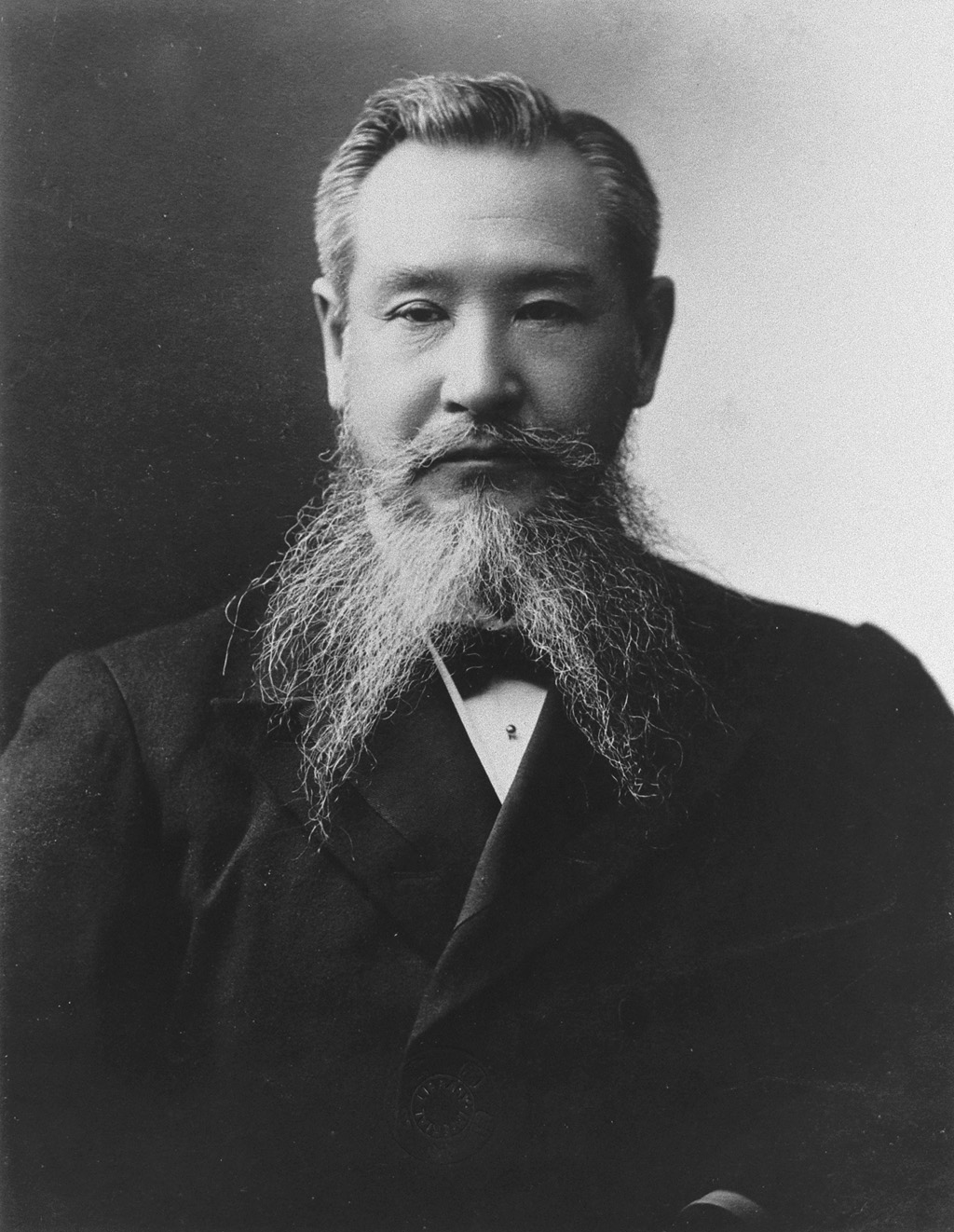

Minister of Agriculture and Commerce
- In office 7 January 1915 – 9 October 1916
- Prime Minister: Ōkuma Shigenobu
- Preceded by: Ōura Kanetake
- Succeeded by: Nakashōji Ren

Speaker of the House of Representatives
- In office 5 December 1903 – 11 December 1903
- Monarch: Meiji
- Deputy: Teiichi Sugita
- Preceded by: Kenkichi Kataoka
- Succeeded by: Matsuda Masahisa

Member of the House of Representatives; from Fukushima
- In office 1 July 1890 – 29 December 1923
- Preceded by: Constituency established
- Succeeded by: Taiji Sugamura
- Constituency: 3rd district (1890–1902); Counties district (1902–1920); 5th district (1920–1923)

Personal details
- Born: 24 August 1849 Miharu, Mutsu, Japan
- Died: 29 December 1923 (aged 74)
- Resting place: Gokoku-ji
- Party: Kenseikai (1916–1923)
- Other political affiliations: Jiyūtō (1881–1884); Rikken Jiyūtō (1890–1898); Kenseitō (1898–1900); Kensei Hontō (1900–1910); Rikken Kokumintō (1910–1913); Rikken Dōshikai (1913–1916)

Kōno Hironaka (河野 広中; 24 August 1849 – 29 December 1923) was a politician and cabinet minister in the Empire of Japan.

== Biography ==
Kōno was a native of Mutsu Province (modern-day Fukushima Prefecture), where his father, Iwamura Hidetoshi, was a samurai in the service of Miharu Domain, who supplemented his 100 koku income through trade in clothes, sake brewing and wholesale of marine products. Kōno was sent to Edo for studies in Confucianism and was drawn into the sonnō jōi movement. During the Boshin War, he fought against his family, whose Miharu Domain remained loyal to the Tokugawa shogunate and which was a member of the Ōuetsu Reppan Dōmei. Following the Meiji Restoration, he served as an administrator in many locations in northern Japan for the new Meiji government, and became associated with Itagaki Taisuke and the Freedom and People's Rights Movement. With the Satsuma Rebellion, Kōno resisted attempts to recruit him to the side of Saigō Takamori, but instead joined Itagaki in forming the Aikokusha movement, pushing for the creation of a national assembly. He was one of the founding members of the Jiyūtō political party in 1881. He was leader of the Jiyūtō in Fukushima Prefecture from 1882–1883, during the time of the Fukushima Incident of 1882, when conservative forces within the government sought to curb the growing power of the Jiyūtō through illegal means.

Kōno won a seat in the Lower House of the Diet of Japan in the 1890 general election, and was subsequently reelected fourteen consecutive times to the same seat through to the 1920 general election. In 1898, he became a member of the Kenseitō. Over the course of his career, he migrated from the Rikken Seiyūkai to the Rikken Kokumintō to the Rikken Dōshikai and finally to the Kenseikai.

Kōno was briefly (for a six-day period) Speaker of the Lower House in December 1903, causing an uproar for calling for the impeachment of Prime Minister Katsura Tarō during his inaugural speech in front of Emperor Meiji.

In 1909, he supported the Pan-Asian Movement, creating a group dedicated to the liberation of Asia from Western colonialism. From 1915-1916, Kōno was appointed Minister of Agriculture and Commerce in the second cabinet of Ōkuma Shigenobu. Kōno died in 1923 aged 74 and his grave is located at the temple of Gokoku-ji in Bunkyo, Tokyo.

House of Representatives (Japan)
Preceded by Kataoka Kenkichi	Speaker of the House of Representatives; 6–11 December 1913	Succeeded by Matsuda Masahisa
Political offices
Preceded by Ōura Kanetake	Minister of Agriculture & Commerce; 7 January 1915 – 9 October 1916	Succeeded by Nakashōji Ren
