= Ōura Kanetake =

Japanese politician (1850–1918)

Junior Second Rank Viscount Ōura Kanetake
- 大浦 兼武
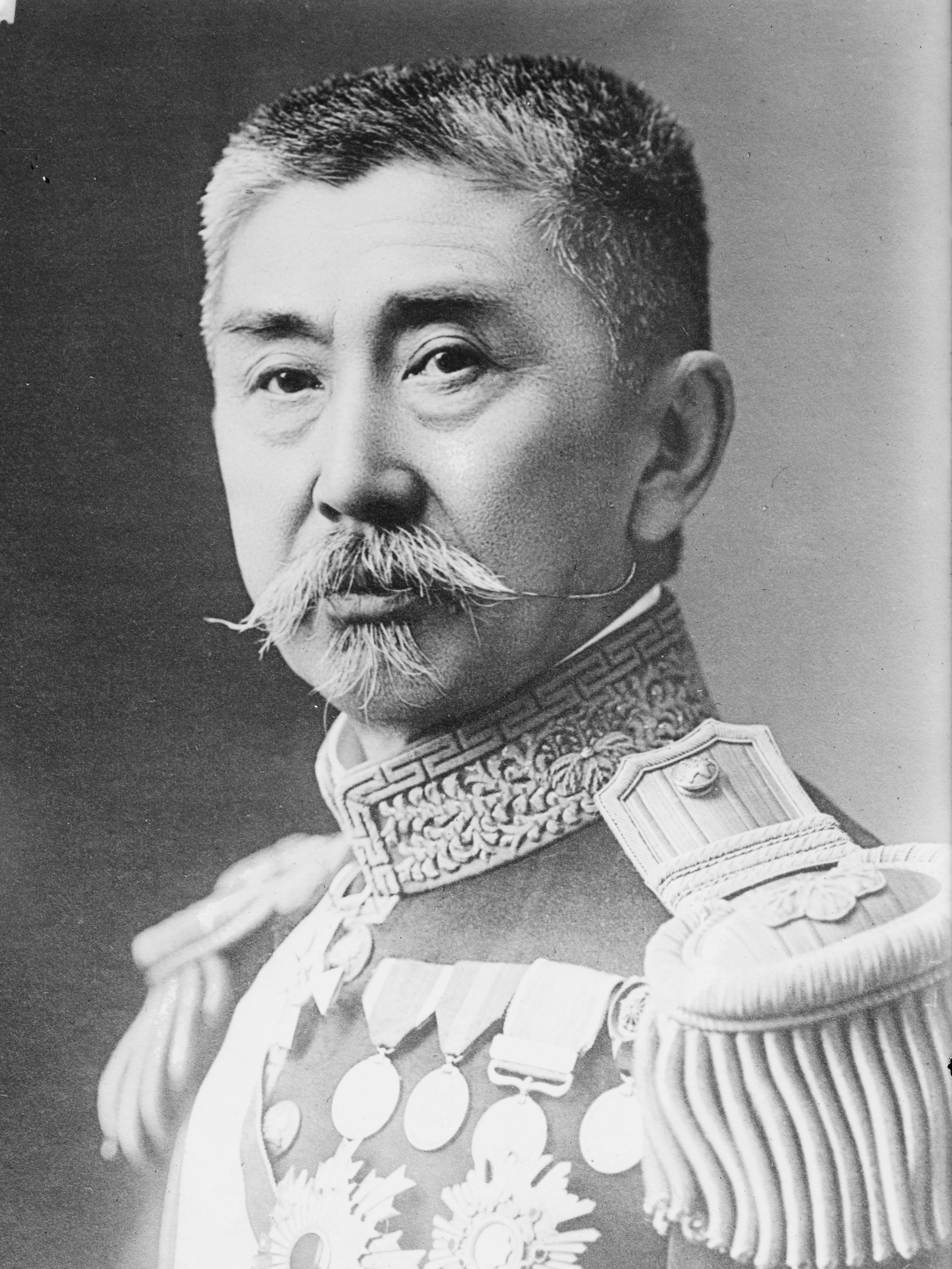
- Ōura in 1910

Minister of Home Affairs
- In office 7 January 1915 – 30 July 1915
- Prime Minister: Ōkuma Shigenobu
- Preceded by: Ōkuma Shigenobu
- Succeeded by: Ōkuma Shigenobu
- In office 21 December 1912 – 20 February 1913
- Prime Minister: Katsura Tarō
- Preceded by: Hara Takashi
- Succeeded by: Hara Takashi

Minister of Agriculture and Commerce
- In office 16 April 1914 – 7 January 1915
- Prime Minister: Ōkuma Shigenobu
- Preceded by: Yamamoto Tatsuo
- Succeeded by: Kōno Hironaka
- In office 14 July 1908 – 30 August 1911
- Prime Minister: Katsura Tarō
- Preceded by: Matsuoka Yasutake
- Succeeded by: Komatsubara Eitarō (acting); Makino Nobuaki

Minister of Communications
- In office 22 September 1903 – 7 January 1906
- Prime Minister: Katsura Tarō
- Preceded by: Sone Arasuke
- Succeeded by: Yamagata Isaburō

Member of the House of Peers
- In office 19 March 1900 – 3 August 1915 Nominated by the Emperor
Gubernatorial offices
Governor of Miyagi Prefecture
In office 28 July 1898 – 9 August 1898
Monarch	Meiji
Preceded by	Tokito Tamemoto
Succeeded by	Chikami Kiyoomi
Governor of Kumamoto Prefecture
In office 1 December 1896 – 28 July 1898
Monarch	Meiji
Preceded by	Masanao Matsudaira
Succeeded by	Tokuhisa Tsunenori
Governor of Yamaguchi Prefecture
In office 26 March 1895 – 1 December 1896
Monarch	Meiji
Preceded by	Taro Hara
Succeeded by	Kanemichi Anraku
Governor of Shimane Prefecture
In office 21 March 1893 – 27 March 1895
Monarch	Meiji
Preceded by	Shinozaki Gorō
Succeeded by	Sogabe Michio

Personal details
- Born: 15 June 1850 Miyanojō, Satsuma, Japan
- Died: 30 September 1918 (aged 68) Kamakura, Kanagawa, Japan
- Party: Independent
- Known for: Ōura scandal

Viscount Ōura Kanetake (大浦 兼武; 15 June 1850 – 30 September 1918) was a politician and bureaucrat in late Meiji and early Taishō period Empire of Japan.

== Early life ==
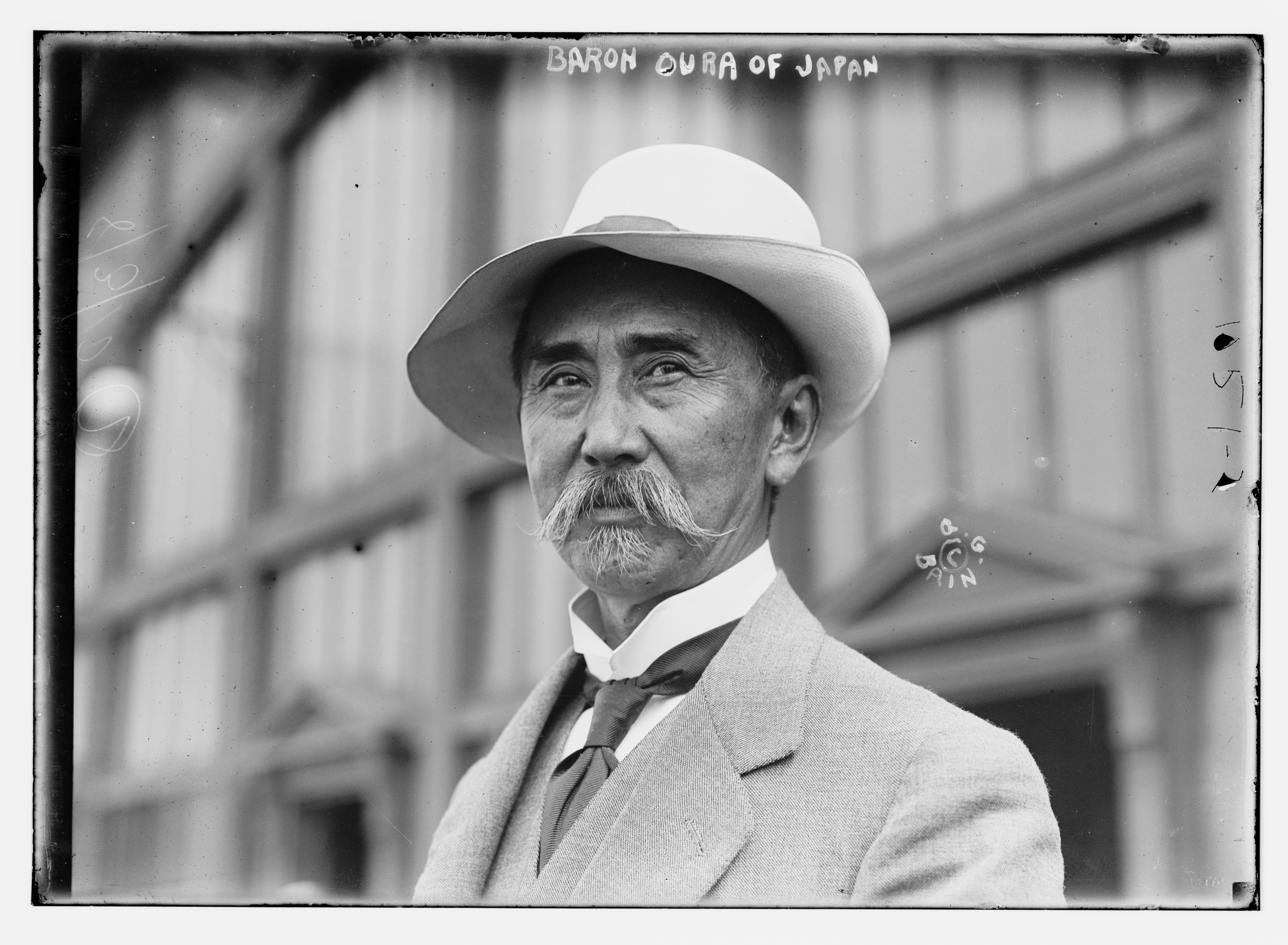
Baron Oura of Japan. Source: Library of Congress

The Ōura family was hereditary retainers to a branch of the Shimazu clan of Satsuma Domain. As a Satsuma samurai, Ōura Kanetaka participated in the Boshin War and the suppression of the Ōuetsu Reppan Dōmei during the Meiji Restoration. Under the new Meiji government, he joined the fledgling Japanese police force, working his way up through the ranks until he became Assistant Police Inspector of the Tokyo Metropolitan Police Department. In this capacity, he was field commander of the police forces sent to assist the fledgling Imperial Japanese Army in suppressing his fellow Satsuma countrymen in the Satsuma Rebellion.

== Political career ==
After serving as appointed governor of Shimane Prefecture (1893–1895), Yamaguchi Prefecture (1895–1896), Kumamoto Prefecture (1896–1898) and Miyazaki Prefecture (1898), Ōura was appointed Superintendent General of the Police, and was given a seat in the House of Peers of the Diet of Japan. One of his proposals while in charge of the police was to relocate impoverished residents of central Osaka to a new planned town in the outskirts, on the theory that poverty was the cause of disease and crime. The plan failed due to strong local opposition. In 1903, under the 1st Katsura administration, Ōura became Minister of Communications. He then served as Minister of Agriculture and Commerce under the 2nd Katsura cabinet and was also chairman of the Japanese committee organizing the Japan–British Exhibition. In 1907, he was raised to the rank and title of danshaku (baron) under the kazoku peerage system. He subsequently served as Home Minister under the 3rd Katsura cabinet and as both Minister of Agriculture and Trade and Home Minister under the 2nd Ōkuma administration. In 1911, his title was elevated to that of shishaku (viscount).

== Ōura scandal ==
In December 1914, while in the Ōkuma administration, Ōura was accused of perpetrating voting fraud in the Diet by bribing minor political party and undecided members to influence passage of a military spending bill introduced by Ōkuma to fund two new infantry divisions for the Imperial Japanese Army. A long-time associate of Katsura, Ōura was one of the founding members and leaders of the Rikken Dōshikai political party, and used his position as Home Minister to influence the 1915 General Election in favor the party. Both issues resulted in an upsurge in public criticism from the press and opposition parties, leading to his resignation from the Cabinet in 1915. This incident came to be known as the Ōura scandal.

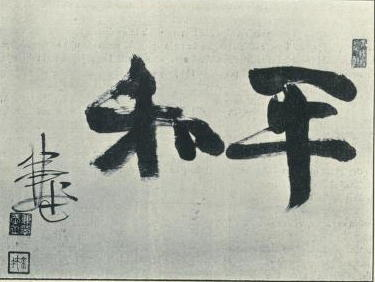
The word "peace" and the signature of the calligrapher, Ōura Kanetake, 1910

== Later life ==
In his final years, Ōura served as chairman of the Dai Nippon Butoku Kai.

Ōura died in 1918 at the age of 68.

== Bibliography ==
- Dickenson, Frederick R (2001). War and National Reinvention: Japan in the Great War, 1914-1919. Harvard University Asia Center. ISBN 0674005074.
- Ijichi, Junsei (1956) [1940]. The Life of Marquis Shigenobu Okuma: A Biographical Study in the Rise of Democratic Japan. Hokuseido Press.
- Lebra-Chapman, Joyce. Okuma Shigenobu: statesman of Meiji Japan. Australian National University Press (1973). ISBN 0-7081-0400-2
- Mitchell, Richard (1996). Political History Bribery in Japan. University of Hawaii Press. ISBN 0824818199.
- Mochizuki, Kotarō. (1910) Japan To-day. A Souvenir of the Anglo-Japanese Exhibition held in London, 1910. Tokyo: Liberal News Agency. OCLC 5327867
- Oka Yoshitake, et al. Five Political Leaders of Modern Japan: Ito Hirobumi, Okuma Shigenobu, Hara Takashi, Inukai Tsuyoshi, and Saionji Kimmochi. University of Tokyo Press (1984). ISBN 0-86008-379-9
- Sims, Richard (2001). Japanese Political History Since the Meiji Renovation 1868-2000. Palgrave Macmillan. ISBN 0-312-23915-7.

Political offices
Preceded by Sone Arasuke	Minister of Communications; September 1903 – January 1906	Succeeded by Yamagata Isaburō
Preceded by Matsuoka Yasukowa	Minister of Agriculture & Commerce; July 1908 – August 1911	Succeeded by Makino Nobuaki
Preceded by Hara Takashi	Home Minister; December 1912 – February 1913	Succeeded by Hara Takashi
Preceded by Yamamoto Tatsuo	Minister of Agriculture & Commerce; April 1914 – January 1915	Succeeded by Kōno Hironaka
Preceded by Ōkuma Shigenobu	Home Minister; January 1915 – July 1915	Succeeded by Ōkuma Shigenobu
