= Yoshimichi Hara =

- 原 嘉道
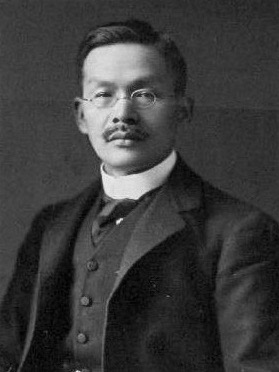

Minister of Justice
- In office 20 April 1927 – 2 July 1929
- Prime Minister: Tanaka Giichi
- Preceded by: Tasuku Egi
- Succeeded by: Chifuyu Watanabe

President of the Privy Council
- In office 24 June 1940 – 7 August 1944
- Monarch: Hirohito
- Vice President: Kantarō Suzuki
- Preceded by: Fumimaro Konoe
- Succeeded by: Kantarō Suzuki

Vice President of the Privy Council
- In office 3 February 1938 – 24 June 1940
- Monarch: Hirohito
- President: Hiranuma Kiichirō; Fumimaro Konoe
- Preceded by: Arai Kentarō
- Succeeded by: Kantarō Suzuki

Member of the Privy Council
- In office 26 December 1931 – 3 February 1938
- Monarch: Hirohito

Personal details
- Born: 23 March 1867 Suzaka, Shinano, Japan
- Died: 7 August 1944 (aged 77) Fujimi, Tokyo, Japan
- Resting place: Tama Cemetery
- Party: Independent
- Education: Tokyo Imperial University

Yoshimichi Hara (原 嘉道) (18 February 1867 – 7 August 1944) was a Japanese statesman and the president of the Japanese privy council during World War II, from June 1940 until his death.

Hara saw the outbreak of a war against the United States to be inevitable due to the growing threat of American influence in the Pacific region prior, and was a key advocate for the attack on Pearl Harbor on the September 6 Gozen Kaigi. Hara was of the opinion that the longer Japan waited to engage the United States, the weaker its position would become, thus subjugating the island nation to the will of American dominance in the region. In the subsequent November 5 Gozen Kaigi, however, Hara pushed for restraint, fearing that an attack on the United States may be seen as a racial war. Thus, Hara opined that an attack would prompt Germany to align with the United States and Britain due to a "common hatred of the yellow race," a fear shared by Hideki Tojo. Hara thus advocated restraint in first strengthening relations with Germany and Italy to avoid "the possibility of Japan being encircled by the Aryan race."

Hara, as president of the privy council, had very little political control since almost all political power was concentrated in war cabinets. Hara did, however, act as the voice for Emperor Hirohito in the privy council and delivered the Emperor's decision to go to war on 1 December 1941, stating that to yield to American demands would threaten the existence of the Empire of Japan.

After his death, Hara was decorated with the posthumous title of Imperial Baron (男爵, danshaku). He was the last commoner to become part of the Japanese aristocracy.

Political offices
| Preceded by Fumimaro Konoe | President of the Privy Council; 1940–1944 | Succeeded by Kantarō Suzuki |
| Preceded by Kentarō Arai | Vice-President of the Privy Council; 1938–1940 | Succeeded by Kantarō Suzuki |
| Preceded by Tasaku Egi | Minister of Justice; 1927–1929 | Succeeded by Chifuyu Watanabe |
Academic offices
| Preceded by Genji Baba | Principal of Chuo University; 1930–1939 | Succeeded by Raizaburo Hayashi |
