= Arai Kentarō =

Japanese politician (1863–1938)

Senior Second Rank Arai Kentarō
- 荒井 賢太郎
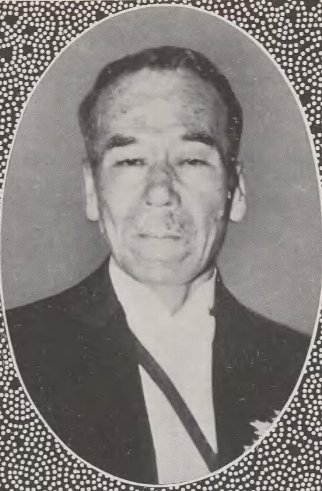

Vice President of the Privy Council
- In office 13 March 1936 – 29 January 1938
- Monarch: Hirohito
- President: Hiranuma Kiichirō
- Preceded by: Hiranuma Kiichirō
- Succeeded by: Yoshimichi Hara

Minister of Agriculture and Commerce
- In office 12 June 1922 – 2 September 1923
- Prime Minister: Katō Tomosaburō
- Preceded by: Yamamoto Tatsuo
- Succeeded by: Den Kenjirō

Member of the Privy Council
- In office 2 October 1926 – 13 March 1936
- Monarchs: Taishō; Hirohito

Member of the House of Peers
- In office 16 May 1917 – 11 October 1926 Nominated by the Emperor

Personal details
- Born: 25 November 1863 Jōetsu, Echigo, Japan
- Died: 29 January 1938 (aged 75) Kamakura, Kanagawa, Japan
- Resting place: Tama Cemetery
- Education: Niigata Normal School; Tokyo Imperial University

Arai Kentarō (荒井 賢太郎; 25 November 1863 – 29 January 1938) was a politician and cabinet minister in the pre-war Empire of Japan.

== Biography ==
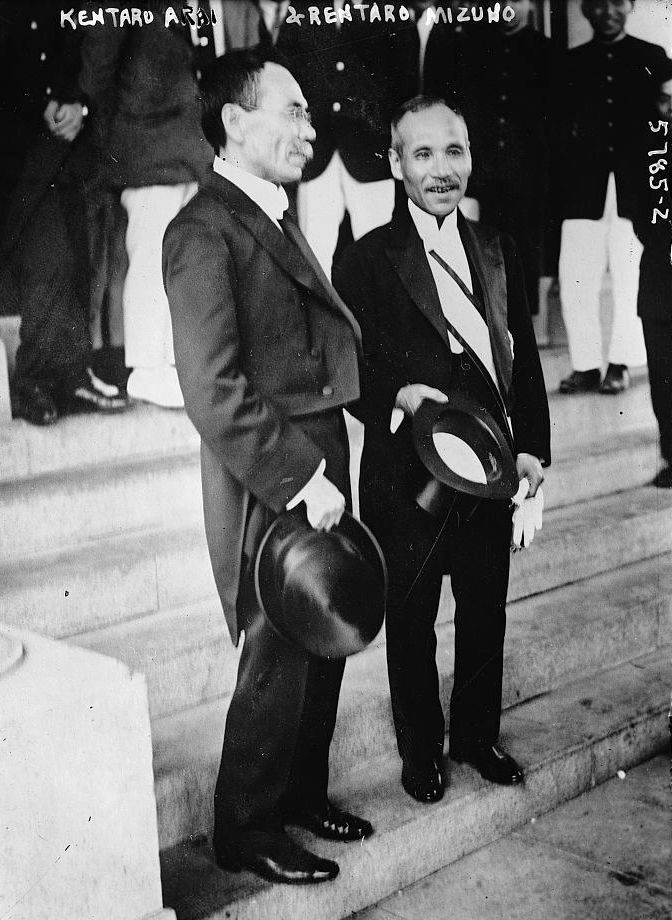
Kentarō Arai (left) and Mizuno Rentarō in the 1920s

Arai was a native of Niigata Prefecture. After graduating from Niigata University, he worked for a period as an elementary school teacher. Subsequently, relocating to Tokyo, he graduated from the law school of Tokyo Imperial University, specializing in French law. His classmates included the future Prime Minister of Japan, Wakatsuki Reijirō and President of the Permanent Court of International Justice Mineichirō Adachi. In 1892, he accepted a post in the Ministry of Finance, rising to head the Budget Bureau. During this period, he also served as a lecturer at the predecessor to Hosei University.

In 1907, Arai was sent to Korea, which had recently become a protectorate of Japan, as a bureaucrat under the Japanese Resident-General of Korea. Following the annexation of Korea in 1910, Arai was assigned to head the Treasury Bureau under the Governor-General of Korea, a post he held to 1917.

In May 1917, Arai was recalled to Japan, and was appointed to a seat in the Upper House of the Diet of Japan. In 1922, he was asked to become Minister of Agriculture & Commerce under the Katō Tomosaburō administration.

Arai resigned his seat in the House of Peers in October 1926 and was appointed to the Privy Council. He became Vice-President of the Privy Council in 1936, and died in office in 1938.

Political offices
| Preceded by Yamamoto Tatsuo | Minister of Agriculture & Commerce; 12 June 1922 – 2 September 1923 | Succeeded by Den Kenjirō |
