= Nakashōji Ren =

Japanese politician

Senior Third Rank Nakashōji Ren
- 仲小路 廉
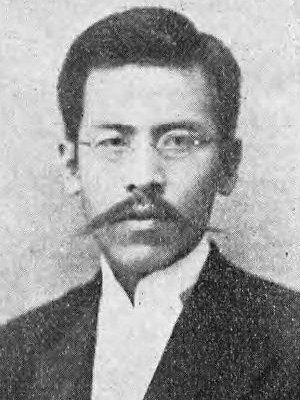

Minister of Agriculture and Commerce
- In office 9 October 1916 – 29 September 1918
- Prime Minister: Terauchi Masatake
- Preceded by: Kōno Hironaka
- Succeeded by: Yamamoto Tatsuo
- In office 21 December 1912 – 20 February 1913
- Prime Minister: Katsura Tarō
- Preceded by: Makino Nobuaki
- Succeeded by: Yamamoto Tatsuo

Member of the Privy Council
- In office 26 September 1923 – 17 January 1924
- Monarch: Taishō

Member of the House of Peers
- In office 24 August 1911 – 27 October 1923 Nominated by the Emperor

Personal details
- Born: 12 August 1866 Tokuyama, Suō, Japan
- Died: 17 January 1924 (aged 57)
- Resting place: Aoyama Cemetery
- Education: Osaka Prefectural Kitano High School
- Alma mater: Kaisei Academy

Nakashōji Ren (仲小路 廉; 12 August 1866 – 17 January 1924) was a politician and cabinet minister in the pre-war Empire of Japan.

Nakashōji was a graduate of the Osaka Prefectural Kitano High School. After graduating from the Kaisei Academy, he worked for a period as court-appointed attorney in the lower court system, and subsequently as a legal councilor in the Court of Appeals and assessor in the Administrative Court system. Afterwards, he entered the central government bureaucracy, and served in various capacities within the Ministry of Communications and Home Ministry. He was selected as Minister of Agriculture and Commerce under the Third Katsura Cabinet from 1912 to 1913, and again to the same portfolio under the Terauchi Cabinet from 1916 to 1918. He was later appointed to a seat in the Upper House of the Diet of Japan, and served on the Privy Council.

Political offices
| Preceded by Makino Nobuaki | Minister of Agriculture & Commerce; December 1912 – February 1913 | Succeeded by Yamamoto Tatsuo |
| Preceded by Kōno Hironaka | Minister of Agriculture & Commerce; October 1916 – September 1918 | Succeeded by Yamamoto Tatsuo |
