= Den Kenjirō =

Japanese politician

Junior Second Rank Baron Den Kenjirō
- 田 健治郎
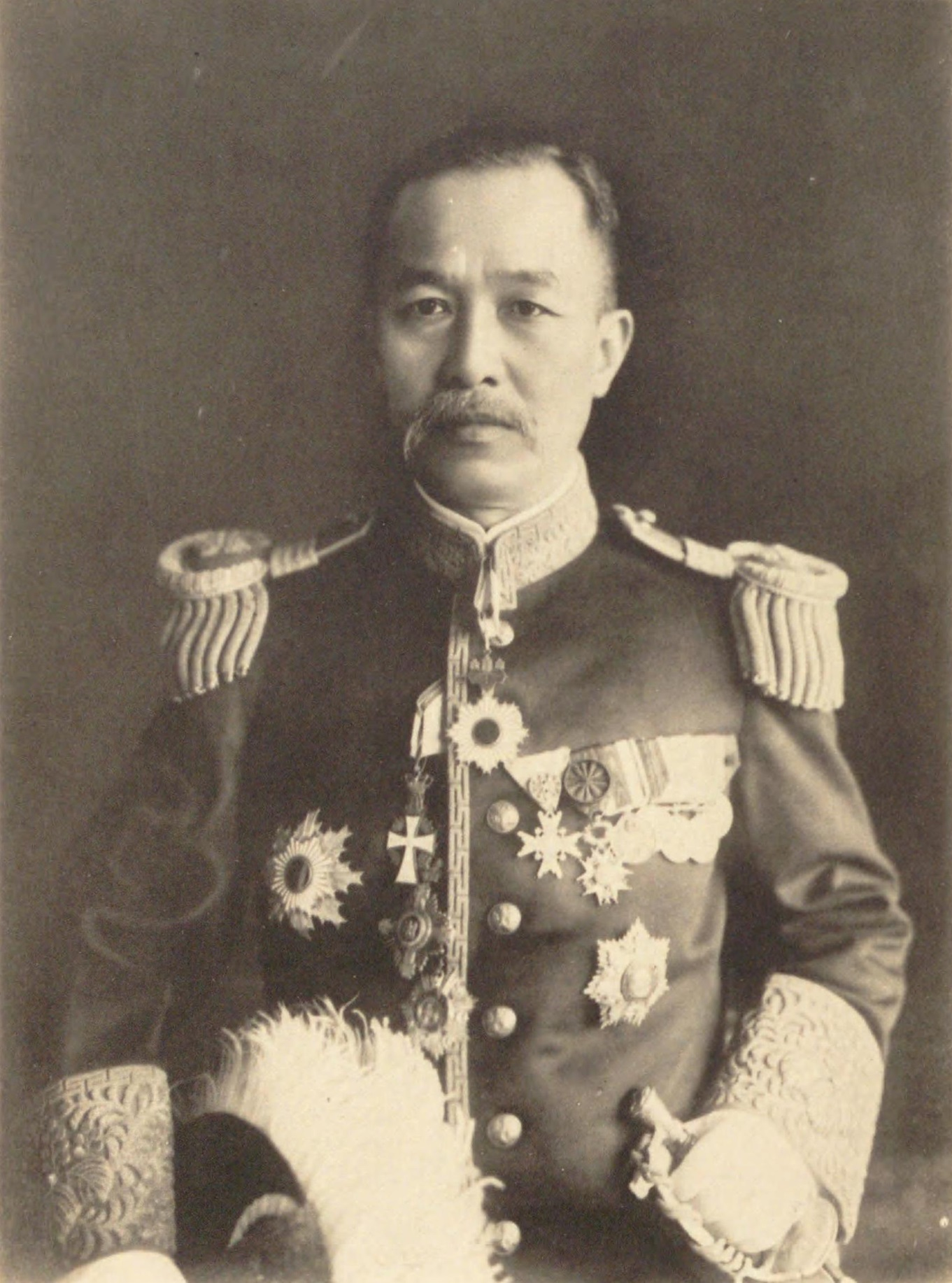

8th Governor-General of Taiwan
- In office 29 October 1919 – 6 September 1923
- Monarch: Taishō
- Preceded by: Akashi Motojirō
- Succeeded by: Uchida Kakichi

Minister of Agriculture and Commerce
- In office 2 September 1923 – 24 December 1923
- Prime Minister: Yamamoto Gonnohyōe
- Preceded by: Arai Kentarō
- Succeeded by: Okano Keijirō

Minister of Justice
- In office 2 September 1923 – 6 September 1923
- Prime Minister: Yamamoto Gonnohyōe
- Preceded by: Okano Keijirō
- Succeeded by: Hiranuma Kiichirō

Minister of Communications
- In office 9 October 1916 – 29 September 1918
- Prime Minister: Terauchi Masatake
- Preceded by: Minoura Katsundo
- Succeeded by: Noda Utarō

Member of the Privy Council
- In office 10 May 1926 – 16 November 1930
- Monarchs: Taishō; Hirohito

Member of the House of Peers
- In office 7 January 1906 – 15 May 1926 Nominated by the Emperor

Member of the House of Representatives
- In office 12 August 1901 – 28 December 1902
- Preceded by: Ueki Toshikazu
- Succeeded by: Multi-member district
- Constituency: Hyōgo 3rd (1901–1902); Hyōgo Counties (1902)

Personal details
- Born: 25 March 1855 Tanba, Kaibara, Japan
- Died: 16 November 1930 (aged 75) Tamagawa, Tokyo, Japan
- Resting place: Tama Cemetery
- Party: Rikken Seiyūkai
- Relatives: Hideo Den (grandson)

Baron Den Kenjirō (田 健治郎; 25 March 1855 – 16 November 1930) was a Japanese politician and cabinet minister in the pre-war government of the Empire of Japan. He was also the 8th Japanese Governor-General of Taiwan from October 1919 to September 1923, and the first civilian to hold that position. Den was also a co-founder of Kaishinsha Motorcar Works, a predecessor to present-day Nissan and the original manufacturer of Datsun automobiles.

== Biography ==
Den was born in Tanba-Kaibara Domain, located in Hikami District of Tanba Province (part of the modern-day city of Tanba, Hyōgo), where his father was a village headman (nanushi). After the Meiji Restoration, he sought his fortune in Kumamoto Prefecture (1874), followed by Aichi Prefecture in 1875. Entering service of the police department, he was subsequently assigned to Kōchi Prefecture, Kanagawa Prefecture and Saitama Prefecture. Around 1890, he came to the attention of Communications Minister Gotō Shōjirō, who recruited him into the central bureaucracy of the Meiji government. He rose to the position of vice minister, and concurrently served on the board of governors of the Japanese Government Railways. In 1898, he resigned from government service to accept an appointment as president of the Kansai Railway Company.

He returned to government service in 1900 as Director of the Administration Bureau of the Communications Ministry, but resigned again only a year later to run for election to the Lower House of the Diet of Japan under the sponsorship of Itō Hirobumi and the Rikken Seiyūkai political party. He served for two non-consecutive terms, returning each time to a senior post within the Ministry of Communications. In 1906, he was appointed to the House of Peers, and the following year was made a baron (danshaku) within the kazoku peerage system. In politics, he became closely aligned with the faction under the conservative genrō, Yamagata Aritomo, but later broke with Yamagata over issues pertaining to the Siemens scandal.

Den was also one of the founders of the Kaishinsha Motorcar Works in 1914. The "D" in the company acronym "DAT" was from "Den". Later changed to "Datsun", the company was acquired by the Nissan zaibatsu in the 1930s.

From 1916 to 1918, under Prime Minister Terauchi Masatake, Den was appointed Minister of Communications. During this period, he expressed concerns over the dominance of the United States and Great Britain over the new League of Nations, which contributed to an "encirclement" of Japan. In 1919, Den was appointed Governor-General of Taiwan, the first civilian to be appointed to that post. As Governor-General, he promoted new policies of social and political assimilation, wherein discriminatory laws in education were repealed. Several major reforms were carried out during Den's tenure, including various administrative reforms, expansion of the public education system, reduction of police involvement in local administration, construction of the Chanan Reservoir, and the legalization of Japanese-Taiwanese intermarriage. Den’s stated goal was that the Taiwanese populace was to eventually enjoy the same political rights as the Japanese in the Home Islands, and that the Taiwanese would be assimilated into normal Japanese society. Business laws were eased to allow Taiwanese entrepreneurs to complete with Japanese, and several Taiwanese-owned newspapers were established. Under his tenure, then Crown Prince Hirohito made a state visit to Taiwan.

Following the 1923 Great Kantō earthquake, Den was recalled to Tokyo, and asked to take the posts of Minister of Justice and Minister of Agriculture and Commerce in the 2nd Yamamoto Gonnohyōe administration. Together with Home Minister Gotō Shimpei, he laid the foundations for the reconstruction of Tokyo after the disaster. However, along with the rest of the cabinet, he was forced to resign in the aftermath of the Toranomon Incident. After 1926, he served as a member of the Privy Council. Den died of complications following an Intracranial hemorrhage in 1930 at his home in Tamagawa, Tokyo. His grave is at the Tama Cemetery in Fuchū, Tokyo.

Den kept a detailed diary from 1906 to his death in 1930, which forms an important source document for the history of politics during the Taishō period of Japanese history.

== Awards and decorations ==
=== Japanese ===
==== Peerages and titles ====
- Baron (21 September 1907)

==== Court ranks ====
- Junior Seventh Rank (23 May 1882)
- Senior Seventh Rank (8 July 1886)
- Senior Sixth Rank (8 December 1891)
- Junior Fifth Rank (12 December 1892)
- Senior Fifth Rank (11 April 1893)
- Junior Fourth Rank (28 February 1898)
- Senior Fourth Rank (20 September 1898)
- Junior Third Rank (30 September 1916)
- Senior Third Rank (10 November 1922)
- Junior Second Rank (1 April 1930)

==== Decorations ====
| Year awarded | Ribbon | Decoration | Notes |
|---|---|---|---|
| 29 November 1892 | | Order of the Sacred Treasure, 6th class | |
| 28 December 1893 | | Order of the Sacred Treasure, 5th class | |
| 5 March 1894 | | Emperor Meiji for 25th Wedding Anniversary Medal | |
| 21 June 1895 | | Order of the Sacred Treasure, 4th class | |
| 31 October 1895 | | Order of the Rising Sun, 3rd class | |
| 18 November 1895 | | First Sino-Japanese War Medal | |
| 1 April 1906 | | Order of the Rising Sun, 2nd class | |
| 1 April 1906 | | Russo-Japanese War Medal | |
| 1 August 1912 | | Korean Annexation Commemorative Medal | |
| 10 November 1915 | | Emperor Taishō Enthronement Commemorative Medal | |
| 25 December 1919 | | Order of the Sacred Treasure, 1st Class | |
| 1 November 1920 | | Grand Cordon of the Order of the Rising Sun | |
| 2 November 1920 | | First World War Medal (1914–1920) | |
| 1 July 1921 | | First National Census Commemorative Medal | |
| 10 November 1928 | | Emperor Shōwa Enthronement Commemorative Medal | |
| 16 November 1930 | | Grand Cordon of the Order of the Rising Sun with Paulownia Flowers | (posthumous) |
| 16 November 1930 | | Imperial Capital Rehabilitation Commemorative Medal | (posthumous) |

=== Foreign ===
| Year awarded | Country | Ribbon | Decoration | Notes |
|---|---|---|---|---|
| 12 April 1894 | French Republic | | Officer of the Legion d'Honneur | |
| 20 January 1897 | Denmark | | Knight Grand Officer of the Order of the Dannebrog | |
| 28 May 1897 | Austria-Hungary | | Order of the Iron Crown, 2nd Class | |
| 26 August 1897 | Ottoman Empire | | Order of the Medjidie, 2nd Class | |
| 16 April 1898 | Kingdom of Romania | | Commander of the Order of the Star of Romania | |

== See also ==
- Taiwan under Japanese rule

== Notes ==
Government offices
| Preceded by Akashi Motojirō | Governor-General of Taiwan; October 1919 – September 1923 | Succeeded by Uchida Kakichi |
Political offices
| Preceded by Minoura Katsundo | Minister of Communications; October 1916 – September 1918 | Succeeded by Noda Utarō |
| Preceded by Okano Keijirō | Minister of Justice; September 1923 – September 1923 | Succeeded by Hiranuma Kiichirō |
| Preceded by Arai Kentarō | Minister of Agriculture and Commerce; September 1923 – December 1923 | Succeeded by Okano Keijirō |
