= Yamamoto Tatsuo =

Japanese politician and Governor of the Bank of Japan

Senior Second Rank Baron Yamamoto Tatsuo
- 山本 達雄
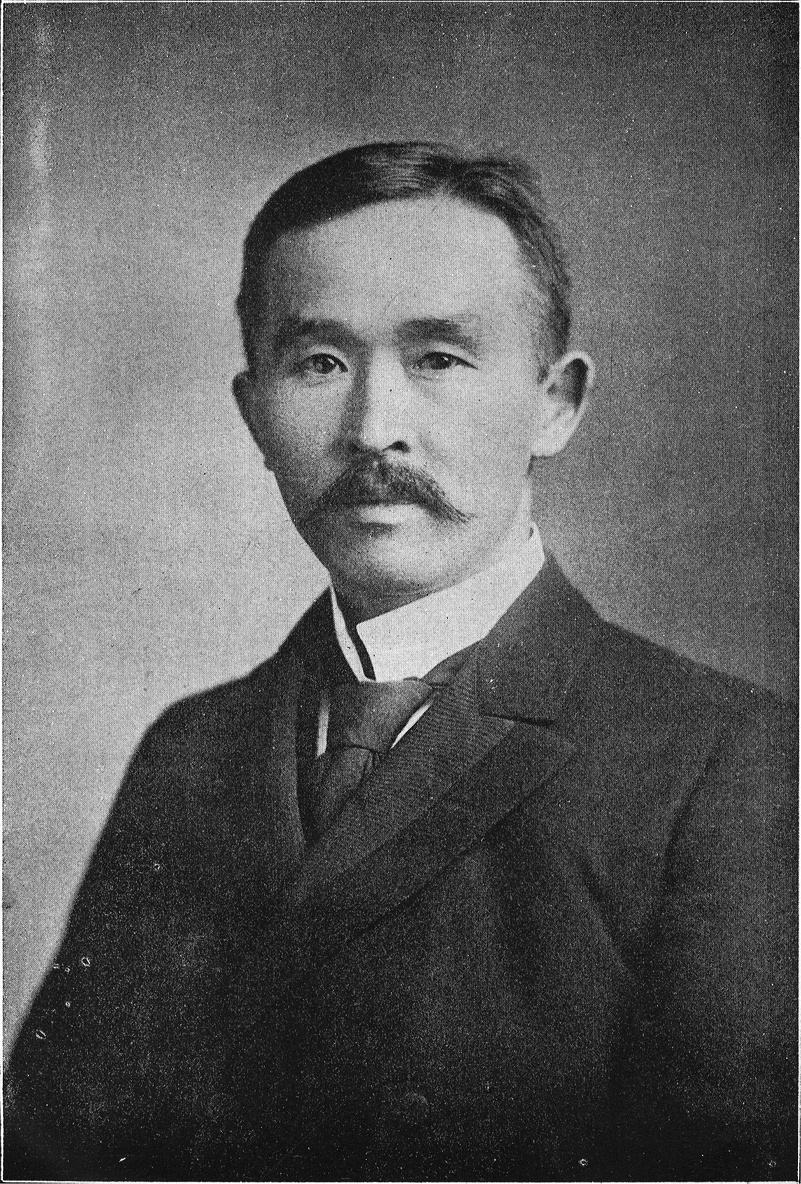
- Yamamoto in 1898

Minister of Home Affairs
- In office 26 May 1932 – 8 July 1934
- Prime Minister: Saitō Makoto
- Preceded by: Suzuki Kisaburō
- Succeeded by: Fumio Gotō

Minister of Agriculture and Commerce
- In office 29 September 1918 – 12 June 1922
- Prime Minister: Hara Takashi; Takahashi Korekiyo
- Preceded by: Nakashōji Ren
- Succeeded by: Arai Kentarō
- In office 20 February 1913 – 16 April 1914
- Prime Minister: Yamamoto Gonnohyōe
- Preceded by: Nakashōji Ren
- Succeeded by: Ōura Kanetake

Minister of Finance
- In office 30 August 1911 – 21 December 1912
- Prime Minister: Saionji Kinmochi
- Preceded by: Katsura Tarō
- Succeeded by: Wakatsuki Reijirō

Governor of the Bank of Japan
- In office 20 October 1898 – 19 October 1903
- Preceded by: Iwasaki Yanosuke
- Succeeded by: Shigeyoshi Matsuo

Member of the House of Peers
- In office 20 November 1903 – 2 May 1947 Nominated by the Emperor

Personal details
- Born: 7 April 1856 Usuki, Ōita, Japan
- Died: 2 November 1947 (aged 91) Kamakura, Kanagawa, Japan
- Resting place: Aoyama Cemetery
- Party: Rikken Minseitō (after 1927)
- Other political affiliations: Rikken Seiyūkai (1912–1925); Seiyūhontō (1925–1927)

Baron Yamamoto Tatsuo (山本 達雄; 7 April 1856 – 2 November 1947) was a Japanese banker and politician who was Governor of the Bank of Japan from 1898 to 1903. He was also a member of the House of Peers and served as a cabinet minister in the pre-war government of the Empire of Japan.

== Early life ==
Yamamoto was born in Usuki, Ōita Prefecture. He was the younger son of a samurai family of Usuki Domain. After the Meiji Restoration, at 19 he moved to Osaka, and at 22 to Tokyo, where he studied at a school run by the Mitsubishi company.

== Career ==
Yamamoto's first employment was as a teacher at the Osaka University of Commerce. At 26, he was appointed its principal.

In 1883, Yamamoto turned towards commerce, and obtained a position at the Mitsubishi-affiliated shipping firm Nippon Yusen, in which he rapidly rose through the corporate ranks. In 1890, he joined the Bank of Japan (BOJ), and in 1895 was appointed the chairman of the Yokohama Specie Bank. In April 1896, in order to better acquaint himself with issues pertaining to the gold standard, he travelled to England, and while still in England the following year, was appointed to the board of directors of the Bank of Japan. In October 1898, at the strong request of Bank of Japan governor Iwasaki Yanosuke, he was recalled to Japan to assume the role of governor of the Bank of Japan. He had been with the Bank of Japan for eight years and was 43 years old at the time.

Yamamoto served as BOJ Governor from 20 October 1898 to 19 October 1903. During his tenure, the Japanese economy experienced various crisis pertaining to foreign exchange issues and the gold and silver standards. However, his greatest concern was the increasing budget deficits incurred by the Japanese government. As head of the Bank of Japan, Yamamoto refused to yield to political pressure from the Japanese Diet, the Cabinet, and the genrō to alter his fiscal policies. When political pressure was applied to his subordinates, causing eleven senior managers to resign in protest, Yamamoto used the opportunity to fill the positions with his supporters. Yamamoto's actions were critical in preserving the future independence of the Bank of Japan from politics. In 1903, the combined efforts of Itō Hirobumi and Yamagata Aritomo managed to dislodge Yamamoto from his position. He was then appointed as a member of the House of Peers, and in 1909 became the head of Nippon Kangyo Bank.

In 1911, Prime Minister Saionji Kinmochi decided that he needed an expert in the field of finance to reform the Finance Ministry during his second cabinet, and appointed Yamamoto to become Finance Minister. This was the first time that a businessman had been selected to head a cabinet post, and set a precedent for selecting business executives to head ministries focused on economics or finance. However, with a looming financial crisis in the aftermath of the Russo-Japanese War, Yamamoto strongly opposed the Imperial Japanese Army's demands for additional funding to support an increase in the number of infantry divisions. This issue led directly to the collapse of the Second Saionji Cabinet in 1912. Afterwards, Yamamoto joined the Rikken Seiyūkai party.

After the start of the Taishō period, during the First Cabinet of Yamamoto Gonnohyōe, Yamamoto was picked to become Minister of Agriculture and Commerce. Yamamoto Gonnohyōe also picked another former Bank of Japan governor, Takahashi Korekiyo, to head the Finance Ministry, hoping for a through fiscal revamp of the Japanese government. However, his cabinet was soon brought down by the Siemens scandal. Yamamoto returned again as Minister of Agriculture and Commerce under the subsequent Hara and Takahashi Cabinets from 1918 to 1922. He was ennobled with the kazoku peerage title of danshaku (baron) in 1920.

In 1925, Yamamoto joined the new Seiyūhontō party, along with Ichirō Hatoyama; however, the party failed to gain popular support and soon merged with the Kenseikai to form the Rikken Minseitō. However, as a former member of the rival Seiyūkai, Yamamoto found himself excluded from the highest ranks of the party leadership, and passed over for any important positions until 1932, when he was appointed as Home Minister under the Saitō Cabinet in the aftermath of the March 15 incident. As Home Minister, he presided over a more severe interpretation of the Peace Preservation Law.

Yamamoto continued to serve in the House of Peers until its dissolution by the post-war Constitution of Japan, and died in 1947 at the age of 91. His grave is at Aoyama Cemetery in Tokyo.

== Notes ==
Government offices
| Preceded by Yanosuke Iwasaki | Governor of the Bank of Japan; October 1898 – October 1903 | Succeeded by Shigeyoshi Matsuo |
Political offices
| Preceded by Katsura Tarō | Minister of Finance; August 1911 – December 1912 | Succeeded by Wakatsuki Reijirō |
| Preceded by Nakashōji Ren | Minister of Agriculture and Commerce; February 1913 – April 1914 | Succeeded by Ōura Kanetake |
| Preceded by Nakashōji Ren | Minister of Agriculture & Commerce; September 1918 – June 1922 | Succeeded by Arai Kentarō |
| Preceded by Suzuki Kisaburō | Minister of Home Affairs; May 1932 – July 1934 | Succeeded by Gotō Fumio |
