= Kinpei Matsuoka =

Baron Matsuoka Kinpei
- 松岡 均平
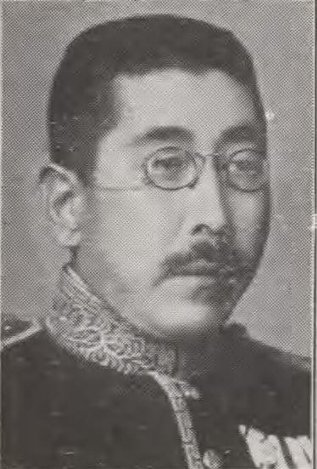

Member of the House of Peers
- In office 1924 – May 1947 Nominated by the Emperor

Personal details
- Born: 28 November 1876 Tokyo, Japan
- Died: 10 June 1960 (aged 83)
- Children: 3
- Parent: Matsuoka Yasutake (father)
- Relatives: Michiharu Mishima (son-in-law)
- Education: Tokyo Imperial University

Baron Kinpei Matsuoka (松岡 均平, Matsuoka Kinpei; 28 November 1876 – 10 June 1960) was a Japanese politician and academic. He was a member of the House of Peers and a Professor of Law at Tokyo Imperial University. He was the son of Baron Matsuoka Yasutake.

== Biography ==
Born in Tokyo on 28 November 1876, the son of Baron Matsuoka Yasutake, Kinpei graduated from Tokyo Imperial University, Department of Political Science in 1900.

Commissioned by the Ministry of Education in 1902 he became an assistant professor at Imperial University in 1903. As an associate professor, he studied economics abroad in Europe and the United States in 1909, returning to Japan in 1910 upon appointment as a law professor at Tokyo Imperial University. From 1911 to 1921, he served as a Director at Prince Fumimaro Konoe's East Asia Economic Research Center (Toa Keizai Chosakyoku).

In 1922 he joined Takushoku University as an Academic Supervisor. Matsuoka resigned in 1924 after succeeding his father as baron (danshaku) in the kazoku peerage upon his father's passing in 1923. He then served in the House of Peers until May 1947. The Japan Academy recognized Matsuoka for his academic achievements with the Gomontsuki Ginkabin in 1945.

Matsuoka married the former Nishikawa Yuka and had 3 children; his son Yasumitsu, who would go on to be a professor at Nihon University, and two daughters.
