= Ōura scandal =

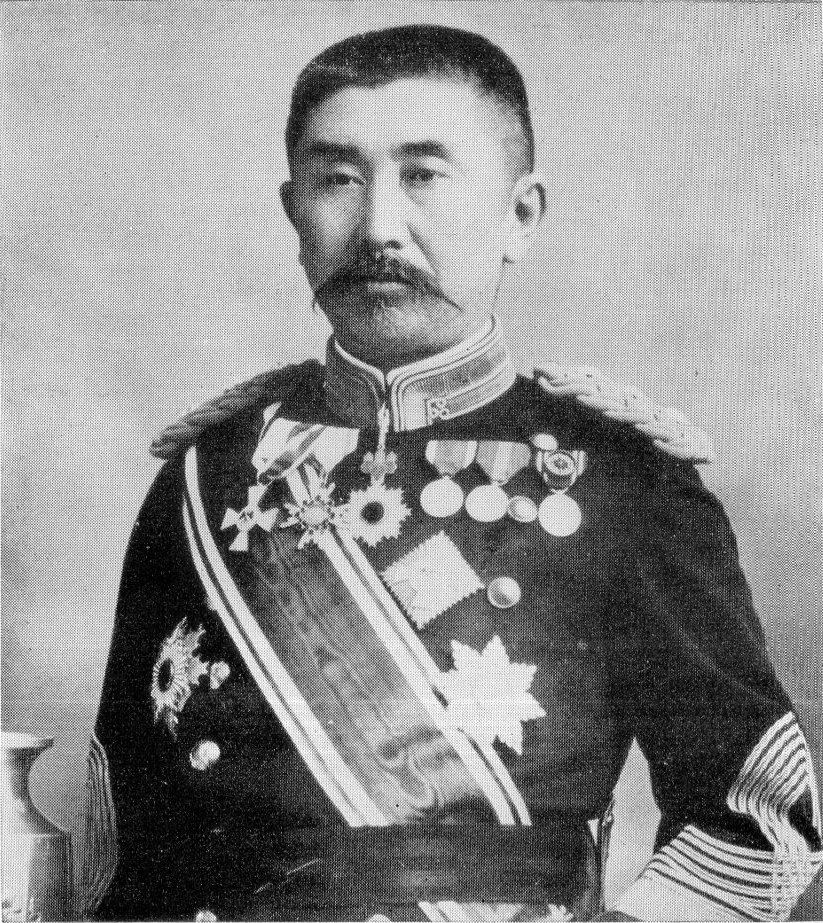
Ōura Kanetake

The Ōura Scandal (大浦事件, Ōura jiken) of 1915 was one of several spectacular political scandals of late Meiji and Taishō periods in Japanese history.

After the entry of Japan into World War I, the administration of Prime Minister Ōkuma Shigenobu had to report to the lower house of the Diet that expenditures had greatly exceeded projections, and furthermore had to put forth a request by the Imperial Japanese Army for an increase in funding to support an additional 86,000 men – a request which had previously led to the collapse of the Saionji administration. As the majority of the lower house controlled by opposition parties hostile to Ōkuma, the request for additional funds failed and Ōkuma dissolved the house, calling a snap election on March 25, 1915.

In the campaigning during the Japanese election of 1915, Ōkuma avoided any mention of increased funding for the military, but stressed his foreign policy achievements in China (such as the Twenty-One Demands) and elsewhere, as opposed to the opposition Rikken Seiyūkai party, tainted by its recent involvement in the Imperial Navy’s Siemens scandal. The result of the election was a landslide for Ōkuma, with the opposition Seiyūkai losing over ninety seats. Although Ōkuma did not obtain an absolute majority, he was able to pass his bills on military spending and China policy without difficulty.

However, a couple of months after the election, charges began to surface that Ōura Kanetake, the Home Minister, had given funds from the Rikken Dōshikai party to Hayashida Kametarō, the Chief Secretary of the lower house, to distribute to undecided members in order influence the outcome of Ōkuma’s military spending bill. Hayashida resigned, was arrested, and was sent to prison. On July 29, 1915, Ōura was also forced to resign, but was not indicted. Ōkuma's cabinet lost popular support, and its members held mass resignation in October 1915. In 1916, after a long argument with the genrō, Ōkuma resigned as well, and retired from politics permanently.
