= Makino Nobuaki =

Japanese politician (1861–1949)

Count Makino Nobuaki
- 牧野 伸顕
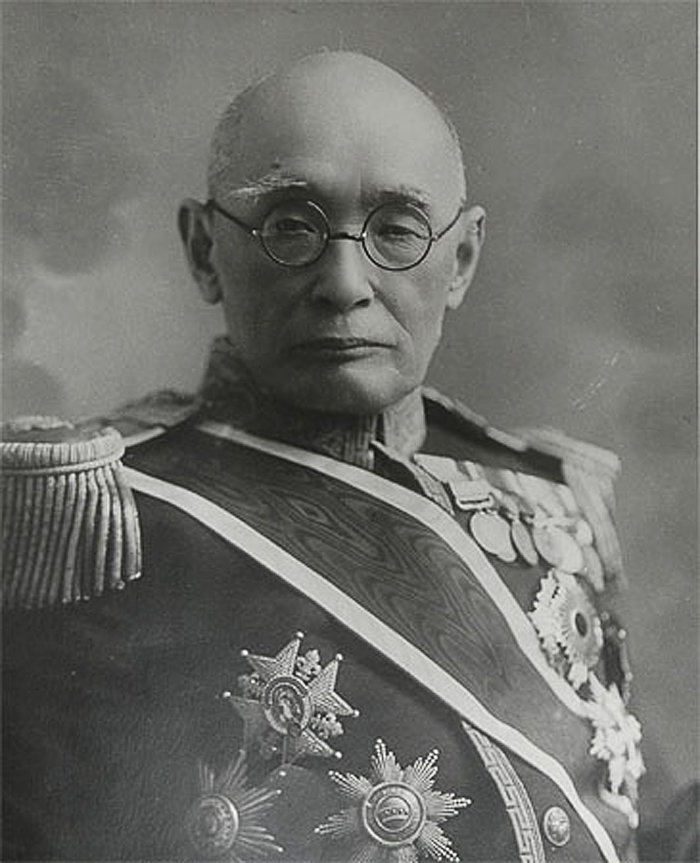

Lord Keeper of the Privy Seal
- In office 30 March 1925 – 26 February 1935
- Monarchs: Taishō; Hirohito
- Preceded by: Hirata Tosuke
- Succeeded by: Saitō Makoto
Ministerial offices
Minister of the Imperial Household
In office 19 February 1921 – 30 March 1925
Monarch	Taishō
Preceded by	Nakamura Yūjirō
Succeeded by	Ichiki Kitokurō
Minister for Foreign Affairs
In office 20 February 1913 – 16 April 1914
Prime Minister	Yamamoto Gonnohyōe
Preceded by	Katō Takaaki
Succeeded by	Katō Takaaki
Minister of Agriculture and Commerce
In office 30 August 1911 – 21 December 1912
Prime Minister	Saionji Kinmochi
Preceded by	Ōura Kanetake; Komatsubara Eitarō (acting)
Succeeded by	Nakashōji Ren
Minister of Education
In office 27 March 1906 – 14 July 1908
Prime Minister	Saionji Kinmochi
Preceded by	Katsura Tarō; Saionji Kinmochi (acting)
Succeeded by	Komatsubara Eitarō

Member of the Privy Council
- In office 17 November 1909 – 19 February 1921
- Monarchs: Meiji; Taishō

Member of the House of Peers
- In office 31 March 1914 – 2 March 1921 Nominated by the Emperor

Governor of Ibaraki Prefecture
- In office 16 November 1892 – 10 March 1893
- Monarch: Meiji
- Preceded by: Ishii Shoichiro
- Succeeded by: Chikaaki Takasaki

Governor of Fukui Prefecture
- In office 13 August 1891 – 16 November 1892
- Monarch: Meiji
- Preceded by: Adachi Toshitsuna
- Succeeded by: Arakawa Kunizō

Personal details
- Born: 24 November 1861 Kagoshima, Satsuma, Japan
- Died: 25 January 1949 (aged 87) Higashi-Katsushika, Chiba, Japan
- Resting place: Aoyama Cemetery
- Spouse: Mineko Makino
- Parent(s): Ōkubo Toshimichi; Hayasaki Masako
- Relatives: Ken'ichi Yoshida (grandson); Shigeru Yoshida (son-in-law)
- Occupation: Politician, cabinet minister, diplomat

Count Makino Nobuaki, also Makino Shinken (牧野 伸顕; 24 November 1861 – 25 January 1949), was a Japanese politician and imperial court official. As Lord Keeper of the Privy Seal of Japan, Makino served as Emperor Hirohito's chief counselor on the monarch's position in Japanese society and policymaking.

After victory in World War I, Makino was appointed to be one of Japan's ambassador plenipotentiaries to the Paris Peace Conference of 1919, headed by the elder statesman, Marquis Saionji. At the conference, he and other members of the delegation put forth a Racial Equality Proposal. It won the majority of votes, but was vetoed by the chairman, President Woodrow Wilson.

Even after his retirement in 1935, he remained a close advisor to the throne through the end of World War II in 1945.

== Early life and education ==
Born to a samurai family in Kagoshima, Satsuma Domain (present day Kagoshima Prefecture), Makino was the second son of Ōkubo Toshimichi, but adopted into the Makino family at a very early age. In 1871, at age 11, he accompanied Ōkubo on the Iwakura Mission to the United States as a student, and briefly attended school in Philadelphia. After he returned to Japan, he attended Tokyo Imperial University, but left without graduating.

== Career ==
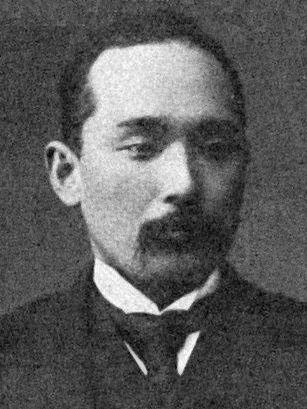
Makino Nobuaki in 1906

Upon beginning his career as a diplomat, Makino was assigned to the Japanese Embassy in London. There, he made the acquaintance of Itō Hirobumi. Following his service abroad, he served as governor of Fukui Prefecture (1891–1892) and Ibaraki Prefecture (1892–1893). He resumed his career in diplomacy as an Ambassador to Italy (1897–1899) and later Ambassador to the Austro-Hungarian Empire and Switzerland.

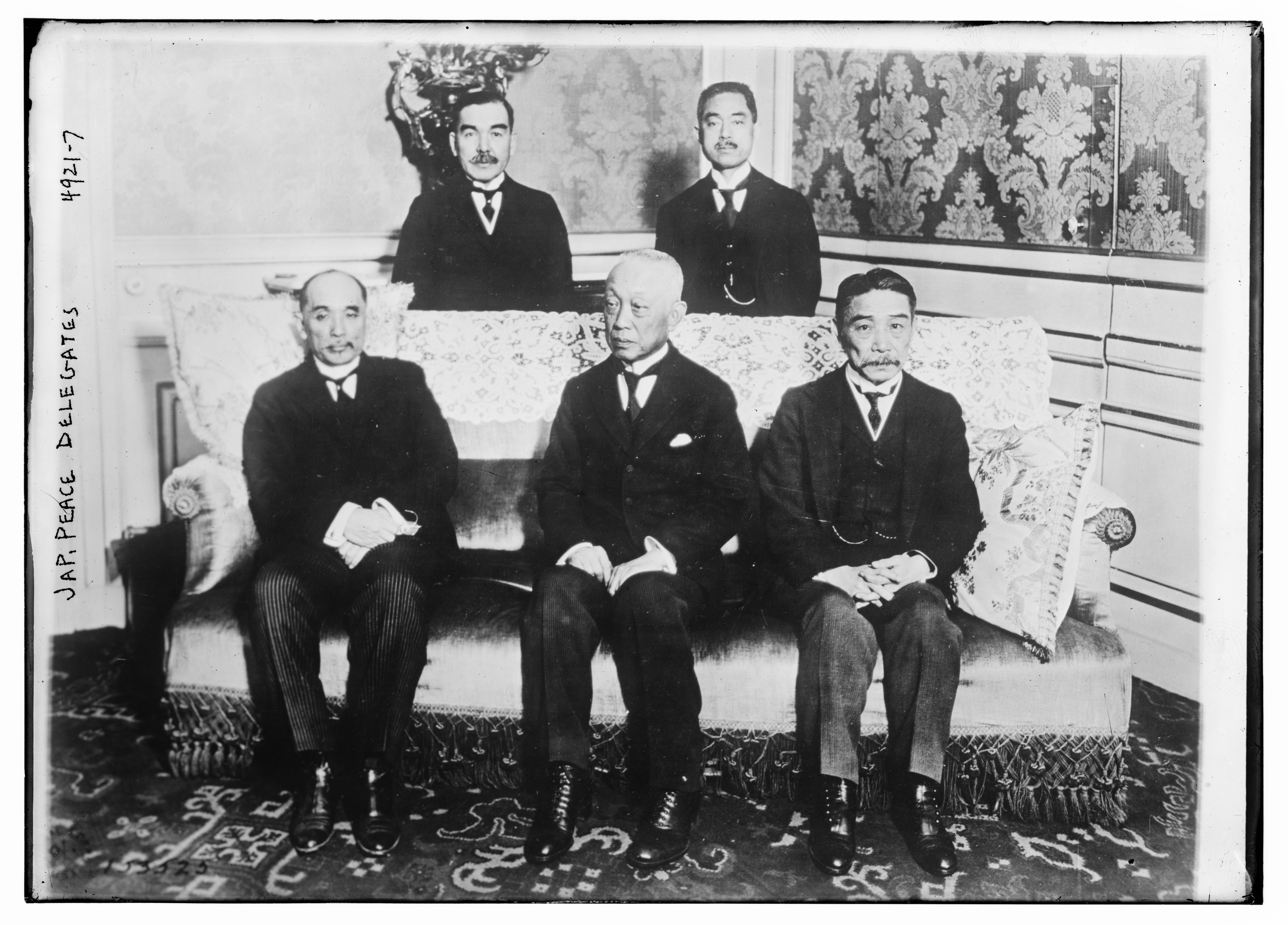
Japan's delegation to the 1919 Paris Peace Conference consisting of former Foreign Minister Baron Makino (seated on the left), former Prime Minister Marquis Saionji (seated, center), and Japanese ambassador to Italy Ijūin Hikokichi (standing, left), among others.

In March 1906, Makino was appointed Minister of Education under Prime Minister Saionji Kinmochi. While serving in the 1st Saionji Cabinet, he was elevated in rank to danshaku (baron) under the kazoku peerage system. When Saionji began his second term as Prime Minister on 30 August 1911, Makino again joined his Cabinet as Minister of Agriculture and Commerce. He was also appointed to serve on the Privy Council. Over the course of his political career, he aligned his policies closely with Itō Hirobumi and later, with Saionji, and was considered one of the early leaders of the Liberalism movement in Japan.

After victory in World War I, Makino was appointed to be one of Japan's ambassador plenipotentiaries to the Paris Peace Conference of 1919, headed by the elder statesman, Marquis Saionji. At the conference, he and other members of the delegation put forth a Racial Equality Proposal. It won the majority of votes, but was vetoed by the chairman, President Woodrow Wilson.

On 20 September 1920, he was awarded the Grand Cordon of the Order of the Rising Sun with Paulownia Flowers. In February 1921, he became Imperial Household Minister and elevated in rank to shishaku (viscount). Behind the scenes, he strove to improve Anglo-Japanese and Japanese-American relations, and he shared Saionji Kinmochi's efforts to shield the Emperor from direct involvement in political affairs. Some historians point to this as having the unforeseen effect of making the Emperor reluctant to curb the trend towards militarism.

In 1925, Makino was appointed Lord Keeper of the Privy Seal of Japan. He supported the Golden Pheasant Academy founded by the Confucian scholar Masahiro Yasuoka in 1927. He oversaw the organization of enthronement ceremony of Emperor Hirohito in 1928. On 15 May 1932, Makino's residence got attacked by the ultra nationalist League of Blood, but he was not harmed. It was part of the May 15 Incident.

In 1935, he relinquished his position as Lord Keeper and was elevated in the title to hakushaku (count). Although he formally retired his positions in 1935, his relations with Hirohito remained good, and he still had much power and influence behind the scenes. This made him a target for radicals in the Japanese military. He only narrowly escaped assassination at a ryokan in Yugawara during the February 26 incident in 1936. He continued to be an advisor and exert a moderating influence on the Emperor until the start of World War II.

== Later life and death ==
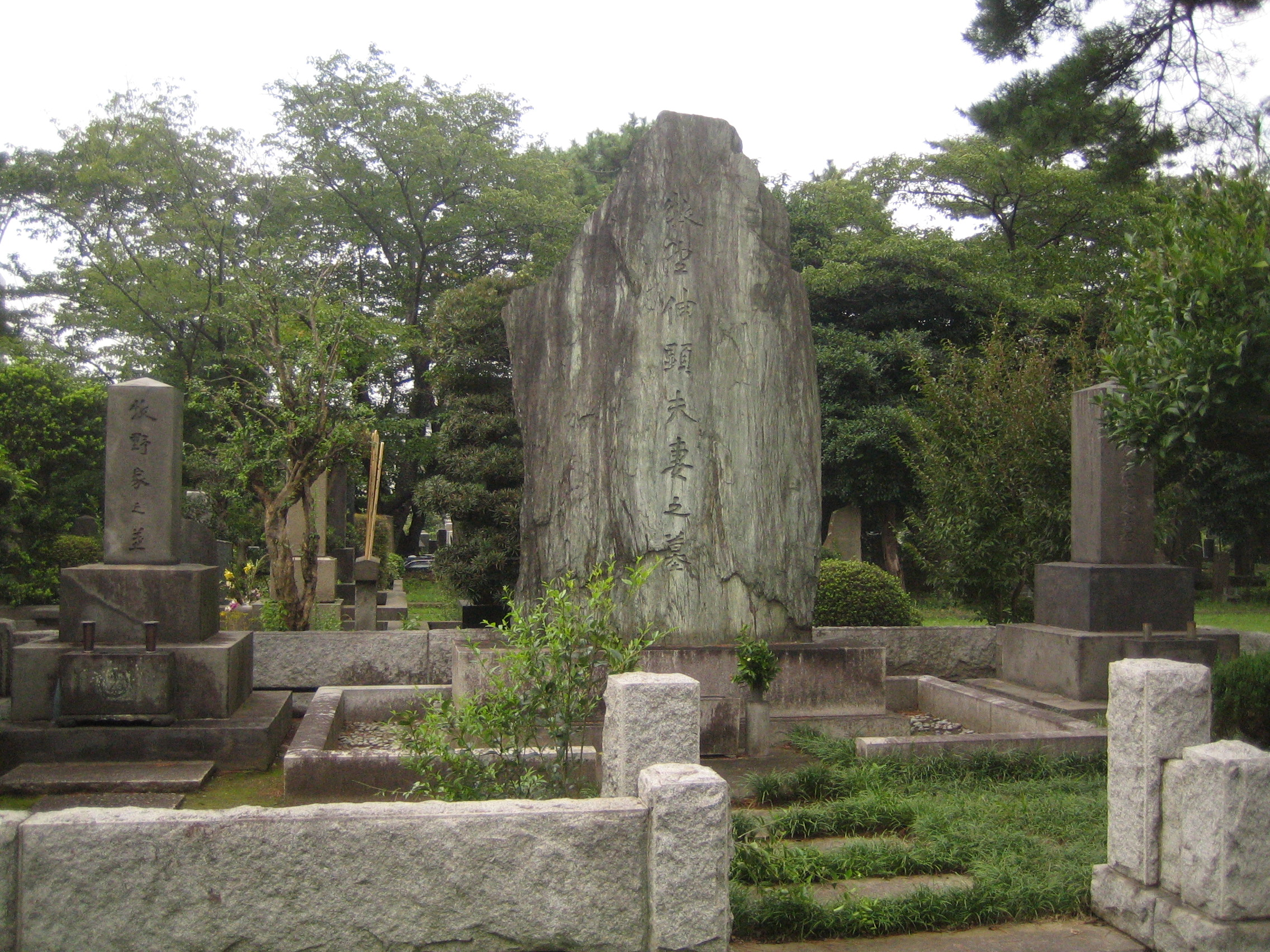
Grave of Makino, at the Aoyama Cemetery.

Makino was also the first president of the Nihon Ki-in Go Society, and a fervent player of the game of go.

After the war, his reputation as an "old liberalist" gave him high credibility, and the politician Ichirō Hatoyama attempted to recruit him to the Liberal Party as its chairman. However, Makino declined for reasons of health and age. He died in 1949, and his grave is at the Aoyama Cemetery in Tokyo.

== Personal life ==
Noted post-war Prime Minister Shigeru Yoshida was Makino's son-in-law. One of his grandchildren Ken'ichi Yoshida was a literary scholar. The former Prime Minister, Tarō Asō, is Makino's great-grandson. His great-granddaughter, Nobuko Asō, married Prince Tomohito of Mikasa, a first cousin of Emperor Akihito. In addition, Ijūin Hikokichi, the former minister of foreign affairs, was the brother-in-law of Makino.

== Honours ==
- 1925: Grand Cordon Order of Leopold.
- 1930: Grand Cross of the Order of the White Lion

== Resources ==
- Agawa, Hiroyuki. The Reluctant Admiral: Yamamoto and the Imperial Navy. Kodansha International (2000). ISBN 4-7700-2539-4
- Beasley, W. G. Japanese Imperialism 1894–1945. Oxford University Press. ISBN 0-19-822168-1
- Bix, Herbert P. (2001). Hirohito and the making of modern Japan. New York: Perennial. ISBN 0-06-093130-2.
- Wetzler, Peter (1998). Hirohito and War: Imperial Tradition and Military Decision Making in Prewar Japan. Honolulu, HI: University of Hawaii Press. ISBN 0-8248-1925-X.
- Wetzler, Peter. "Hirohito's First Adviser: Count Makino Nobuaki". in Hirohito and War (University of Hawaii Press, 1998) pp . 139-178.
- Makino, Nobuaki. Makino Nobuaki nikki. Chūō Kōronsha (1990). ISBN 4-12-001977-2 (Japanese)

Political offices
Preceded by Saionji Kinmochi	Minister of Education; March 1906 – July 1908	Succeeded by Komatsubara Eitarō
Preceded by Ōura Kanetake	Minister of Agriculture & Commerce; August 1911 – December 1912	Succeeded by Nakashōji Ren
Preceded by Haseba Sumitaka	Minister of Education (interim); November – December 1912	Succeeded by Shibata Kamon
Preceded by Katō Takaaki	Minister of Foreign Affairs; February 1913 – April 1914	Succeeded by Katō Takaaki
Preceded by Nakamura Yūjirō	Imperial Household Minister; February 1921 – March 1925	Succeeded by Ichiki Kitokurō
Preceded by Hamao Arata	Lord Keeper of the Privy Seal; March 1925 – February 1935	Succeeded by Saitō Makoto
