= Shigeyoshi Matsuo =

Japanese politician

Baron Shigeyoshi Matsuo
- 松尾 臣善

6th Governor of the Bank of Japan
- In office 20 October 1903 – 1 June 1911
- Prime Minister: Katsura Tarō; Saionji Kinmochi; Katsura Tarō
- Preceded by: Yamamoto Tatsuo
- Succeeded by: Takahashi Korekiyo

Member of the House of Peers
- In office 10 March 1900 – 7 April 1916 Nominated by the Emperor

Personal details
- Born: 6 March 1843 Himeji, Harima, Japan
- Died: 7 April 1916 (aged 73)

Baron Shigeyoshi Matsuo (松尾 臣善, Matsuo Shigeyoshi; 6 March 1843 – 7 April 1916) was a Japanese businessman, central banker and the 6th Governor of the Bank of Japan (BOJ). He was a Baron and a member of Japan's House of Peers from 1900 through 1916.

== Early life ==
Matsuo was born in Hyōgo Prefecture.

== Career ==
In 1900, Matsuo had risen to the position of bureau chief in the Finance Ministry.

Matsuo was BOJ Governor from 20 October 1903 to 1 June 1911. During his term, the bank managed the money supply to restrain inflation.

In 1904, Matsuo assembled the heads of 35 commercial banks, offering favourable terms for lending by BOJ.

Matsuo construed complaints about "bad times" to mean that economic conditions were normal, and that there had been diminished opportunities for speculation.

== Notes ==
Government offices
Preceded by Tatsuo Yamamoto	Governor of the Bank of Japan; 1903–1911	Succeeded by Korekiyo Takahashi
