= Ministry of Agriculture and Commerce =

Japanese government ministry (1881–1925)

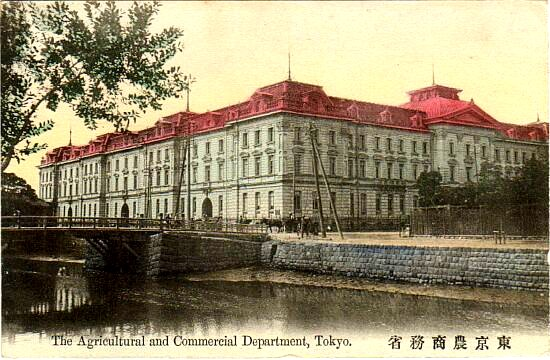
Meiji-era picture postcard of the Ministry of Agriculture and Commerce HQ in Tokyo

The Ministry of Agriculture and Commerce or Trade (農商務省, Nō-shōmu-shō) was a cabinet-level ministry in the government of the Empire of Japan from 1881 to 1925. It was briefly recreated as the Ministry of Agriculture and Commerce (農商省, Nōshō-shō) during World War II.

== History ==
The original Ministry of Agriculture and Commerce was created on April 7, 1881, initially under the Meiji Daijō-kan Cabinet, and then re-established under the Meiji Constitution. It combined the Bureaus of Agriculture, Forestry, Natural History and post station maintenance which were formerly directly under the Prime Minister with the Bureau of Commerce formerly under the control of the Ministry of Finance. The new Ministry was tasked by the Meiji oligarchy with improving production of natural resources and promoting the rapid industrialization of Japan. Although nominally its duties included the protection of workers, in reality it served the needs of industry by guaranteeing a stable labor supply. On December 25, 1885, with the abolishment of the Ministry of Industry, the Ministry of Agriculture and Commerce gained the Bureau of Mines and the Bureau of Civil Engineering. On April 1, 1896 a decision was made to denationalize the iron and steel industry. All government-owned steel mills were divested to private enterprise by February 5, 1901.

The Ministry was instrumental in passing the Japanese Factory Act of 1903, which reformed and regulated labor conditions in factories. On April 1, 1925, the Ministry of Agriculture and Commence was divided into the Ministry of Agriculture and Forestry and the Ministry of Commerce and Industry. The division was a result of long-standing acrimony within the ministry between the "commerce" portion of the ministry, which sought expanded overseas trade, and the protectionist "agriculture" portion of the ministry which sought to ban imports of food, especially rice. In the aftermath of the Rice Riots of 1918, expanded imports of rice into Japan financially ruined many farmers, and the inherently conflicting goals of the two halves of the ministry became apparent.

However, during World War II, the Ministry of Munitions, Ministry of Transport and Communications and the Planning Board absorbed most of the functions of the Ministry of Commerce, and the vestigial remains were merged with the Ministry of Agriculture and Forestry to re-establish the Ministry of Agriculture and Commerce on November 1, 1943. In addition to promoting agriculture, the re-formed ministry was also in charge of distribution of rationed goods.

The Ministry was abolished on August 26, 1945, after the surrender of Japan by order of the Supreme Commander of the Allied Powers. In the post-war Showa Constitution, the ministries were again divided into the Ministry of Agriculture and Forestry and Ministry of Commerce.

== Ministers of Agriculture and Commerce (Meiji-Taisho) ==
	Name	Cabinet	From	To
1	Tani Tateki	1st Itō	22 December 1885	26 July 1887
2	Hijikata Hisamoto	1st Itō	26 July 1887	17 September 1887
3	Kuroda Kiyotaka	1st Itō	17 September 1887	30 April 1888
4	Inoue Kaoru	Kuroda	25 July 1888	23 December 1889
5	Iwamura Michitoshi	1st Yamagata	23 December 1889	17 May 1890
6	Mutsu Munemitsu	1st Yamagata; 1st Matsukata	17 May 1890	14 March 1892
7	Kōno Togama	1st Matsukata	14 March 1892	14 July 1892
8	Sano Tsunetami	1st Matsukata	14 July 1892	8 August 1892
9	Gotō Shōjirō	2nd Itō	8 August 1892	22 January 1894
10	Enomoto Takeaki	2nd Itō; 2nd Matsukata	22 January 1894	29 March 1897
11	Ōkuma Shigenobu	2nd Matsukata	29 March 1897	6 November 1897
12	Yamada Nobumichi	2nd Matsukata	6 November 1897	12 January 1898
13	Itō Miyoji	3rd Itō	12 January 1898	26 April 1898
14	Kaneko Kentarō	3rd Itō	26 April 1898	30 June 1898
15	Ōishi Masami	1st Ōkuma	30 June 1898	8 November 1898
16	Sone Arasuke	2nd Yamagata	8 November 1898	19 October 1900
17	Hayashi Yūzō	4th Itō	19 October 1900	2 June 1901
18	Hirata Tosuke	1st Katsura	2 June 1901	17 July 1903
19	Kiyoura Keigo	1st Katsura	17 July 1903	22 September 1903
20	Kiyoura Keigo	1st Katsura	22 September 1903	7 January 1906
21	Matsuoka Yasukowa	1st Saionji	7 January 1906	14 July 1908
22	Ōura Kanetake	2nd Katsura	14 July 1908	30 August 1911
23	Makino Nobuaki	2nd Saionji	30 August 1911	21 December 1912
24	Nakashōji Ren	3rd Katsura	21 December 1912	20 February 1913
25	Yamamoto Tatsuo	1st Yamamoto	20 February 1913	16 April 1914
26	Ōura Kanetake	2nd Ōkuma	16 April 1914	7 January 1915
27	Kōno Hironaka	2nd Ōkuma	7 January 1915	9 October 1916
28	Nakashōji Ren	Terauchi	9 October 1916	29 September 1918
29	Yamamoto Tatsuo	Hara; Takahashi	29 September 1918	12 June 1922
30	Arai Kentarō	Katō	12 June 1922	2 September 1923
31	Den Kenjirō	2nd Yamamoto	2 September 1923	24 December 1923
32	Okano Keijirō	2nd Yamamoto	24 December 1923	7 January 1924
33	Maeda Toshisada	Kiyoura	7 January 1924	11 June 1924
34	Takahashi Korekiyo	Katō	11 June 1924	1 April 1925

== Ministers of Agriculture and Commerce (World War II) ==
	Name	Cabinet	From	To
1	Tatsunosuke Yamazaki	Tōjō	1 November 1943	19 February 1944
2	Nobuya Uchida	Tōjō	19 February 1944	22 July 1944
3	Toshio Shimada	Koiso	22 July 1944	7 April 1945
4	Tadaatsu Ishiguro	Suzuki	7 April 1945	17 August 1945
5	Sengoku Kotaro	Higashikuni	17 August 1945	26 August 1945

== See also ==
- Agriculture in the Empire of Japan
