= Hidanohana Shigeyoshi =

Japanese sumo wrestler

Personal information
- Native name: 飛騨乃花 成栄
- Born: Osamu Hirabayashi; 13 December 1953 (age 72) Asahi, Gifu, Japan
- Height: 1.81 m (5 ft 11 1/2 in)
- Weight: 128 kg (282 lb)

Sport
- Sport: Sumo
- Retired: March, 1989
- Heya: Futagoyama
- Record: 643-654-0
- Debut: March, 1969
- Highest rank: Maegashira 1 (November, 1981)
- Elder name: Onoe
- Championships: 1 (Jūryō)
- Special Prizes: Fighting Spirit (1)
- Gold Stars: 1 (Kitanoumi)
- Updated on June 2020

Hidanohana Shigeyoshi (born 13 December 1953 as Osamu Hirabayashi) is a former sumo wrestler from Asahi, Gifu, Japan. He made his professional debut in March 1969 and reached the top division in September 1980. His highest rank was maegashira 1. Upon retirement from active competition he became an elder in the Japan Sumo Association under the name Onoe. He left the Sumo Association in March 1994.

== Career record ==
Hidanohana Shigeyoshi
Year	January Hatsu basho, Tokyo	March Haru basho, Osaka	May Natsu basho, Tokyo	July Nagoya basho, Nagoya	September Aki basho, Tokyo	November Kyūshū basho, Fukuoka
1969	x	(Maezumo)	East Jonokuchi #11; 3–4	East Jonidan #69; 4–3	East Jonidan #42; 1–6	East Jonidan #62; 2–5
1970	East Jonidan #66; 5–2	West Jonidan #24; 2–5	West Jonidan #44; 4–3	West Jonidan #22; 3–4	West Jonidan #34; 3–4	West Jonidan #40; 5–2
1971	West Sandanme #80; 5–2	East Sandanme #53; 4–3	East Sandanme #38; 2–5	East Sandanme #58; 4–3	East Sandanme #39; 3–4	West Sandanme #51; 3–4
1972	West Sandanme #55; 5–2	East Sandanme #26; 3–4	East Sandanme #35; 5–2	East Sandanme #6; 3–4	West Sandanme #12; 2–5	East Sandanme #29; 5–2
1973	West Sandanme #2; 3–4	West Sandanme #16; 3–4	East Sandanme #27; 4–3	West Sandanme #14; 2–5	East Sandanme #37; 3–4	West Sandanme #49; 4–3
1974	West Sandanme #38; 6–1–P	West Sandanme #4; 3–4	East Sandanme #16; 5–2	East Makushita #52; 5–2	East Makushita #27; 1–6	East Makushita #50; 3–4
1975	West Sandanme #3; 3–4	East Sandanme #13; 3–4	West Sandanme #24; 4–3	West Sandanme #14; 6–1	East Makushita #42; 5–2	East Makushita #24; 4–3
1976	West Makushita #19; 1–6	West Makushita #44; 2–5	West Sandanme #6; 3–4	West Sandanme #16; 5–2	West Makushita #55; 5–2	West Makushita #31; 5–2
1977	West Makushita #16; 3–4	West Makushita #25; 2–5	West Makushita #45; 3–4	East Makushita #53; 6–1	West Makushita #26; 4–3	East Makushita #18; 3–4
1978	East Makushita #26; 4–3	East Makushita #19; 4–3	East Makushita #14; 3–4	West Makushita #21; 3–4	West Makushita #29; 6–1	East Makushita #10; 3–4
1979	East Makushita #20; 5–2	East Makushita #9; 5–2	East Makushita #3; 5–2	West Jūryō #8; 8–7	West Jūryō #5; 8–7	East Jūryō #3; 8–7
1980	West Jūryō #1; 8–7	West Jūryō #1; 5–10	East Jūryō #10; 10–5–PP	West Jūryō #3; 10–5	West Maegashira #13; 5–10	West Jūryō #5; 8–7
1981	West Jūryō #3; 13–2; Champion	East Maegashira #12; 5–10	East Jūryō #2; 10–5	West Maegashira #11; 8–7	East Maegashira #6; 9–6	West Maegashira #1; 5–10 ★
1982	West Maegashira #7; 6–9	West Maegashira #8; 6–9	East Maegashira #12; 4–11	West Jūryō #1; 7–8	West Jūryō #3; 10–5	West Maegashira #13; 5–10
1983	West Jūryō #3; 11–4–P	West Maegashira #11; 8–7	West Maegashira #4; 4–11	West Maegashira #11; 10–5; F	West Maegashira #2; 5–10	East Maegashira #8; 8–7
1984	West Maegashira #4; 6–9	West Maegashira #9; 7–8	East Maegashira #10; 9–6	East Maegashira #3; 4–11	East Maegashira #12; 10–5	East Maegashira #3; 3–12
1985	East Maegashira #13; 8–7	East Maegashira #11; 4–11	East Jūryō #5; 8–7	West Jūryō #4; 9–6	West Jūryō #1; 10–5–P	East Maegashira #13; 10–5
1986	West Maegashira #3; 2–13	East Maegashira #14; 2–13	East Jūryō #10; 8–7	West Jūryō #6; 7–8	West Jūryō #7; 8–7	East Jūryō #6; 7–8
1987	East Jūryō #7; 8–7	East Jūryō #6; 9–6	West Jūryō #4; 8–7	West Jūryō #3; 7–8	East Jūryō #5; 8–7	West Jūryō #3; 5–10
1988	West Jūryō #8; 9–6	West Jūryō #4; 7–8	East Jūryō #5; 5–10	East Jūryō #12; 9–6	West Jūryō #7; 7–8	East Jūryō #9; 7–8
1989	East Jūryō #10; 5–10	East Makushita #1; Retired –	x	x	x	x
Record given as wins–losses–absences Top division champion Top division runner-up Retired Lower divisions Non-participation Sanshō key: F=Fighting spirit; O=Outstanding performance; T=Technique Also shown: ★=Kinboshi; P=Playoff(s); Divisions: Makuuchi — Jūryō — Makushita — Sandanme — Jonidan — Jonokuchi Makuuchi ranks: Yokozuna — Ōzeki — Sekiwake — Komusubi — Maegashira

== See also ==
- Glossary of sumo terms
- List of sumo record holders
- List of past sumo wrestlers
- List of sumo tournament second division champions
