= Matsuoka Yasutake =

Japanese politician (1846–1923)

Junior First Rank Baron Matsuoka Yasutake
- 松岡 康毅
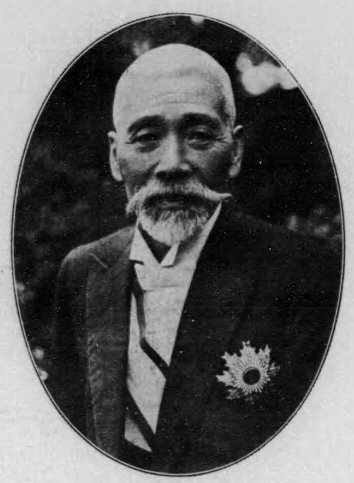

Minister of Agriculture and Commerce
- In office 7 January 1906 – 14 July 1908
- Prime Minister: Saionji Kinmochi
- Preceded by: Kiyoura Keigo
- Succeeded by: Ōura Kanetake

Prosecutor-General of Japan
- In office 5 June 1891 – 20 August 1892
- Prime Minister: Matsukata Masayoshi; Itō Hirobumi
- Preceded by: Miyoshi Taizō
- Succeeded by: Haruki Yoshiaki

Member of the Privy Council
- In office 22 October 1920 – 1 September 1923
- Monarch: Taishō

Member of the House of Peers
- In office 22 December 1891 – 8 November 1920 Nominated by the Emperor

Personal details
- Born: 14 August 1846 Kamiita, Awa, Japan
- Died: 1 September 1923 (aged 77) Hayama, Kanagawa, Japan
- Spouse: Mitsuko Komuro
- Children: Kinpei Matsuoka
- Parent: Katsuyoshi Matsuoka (father)

Matsuoka kamon
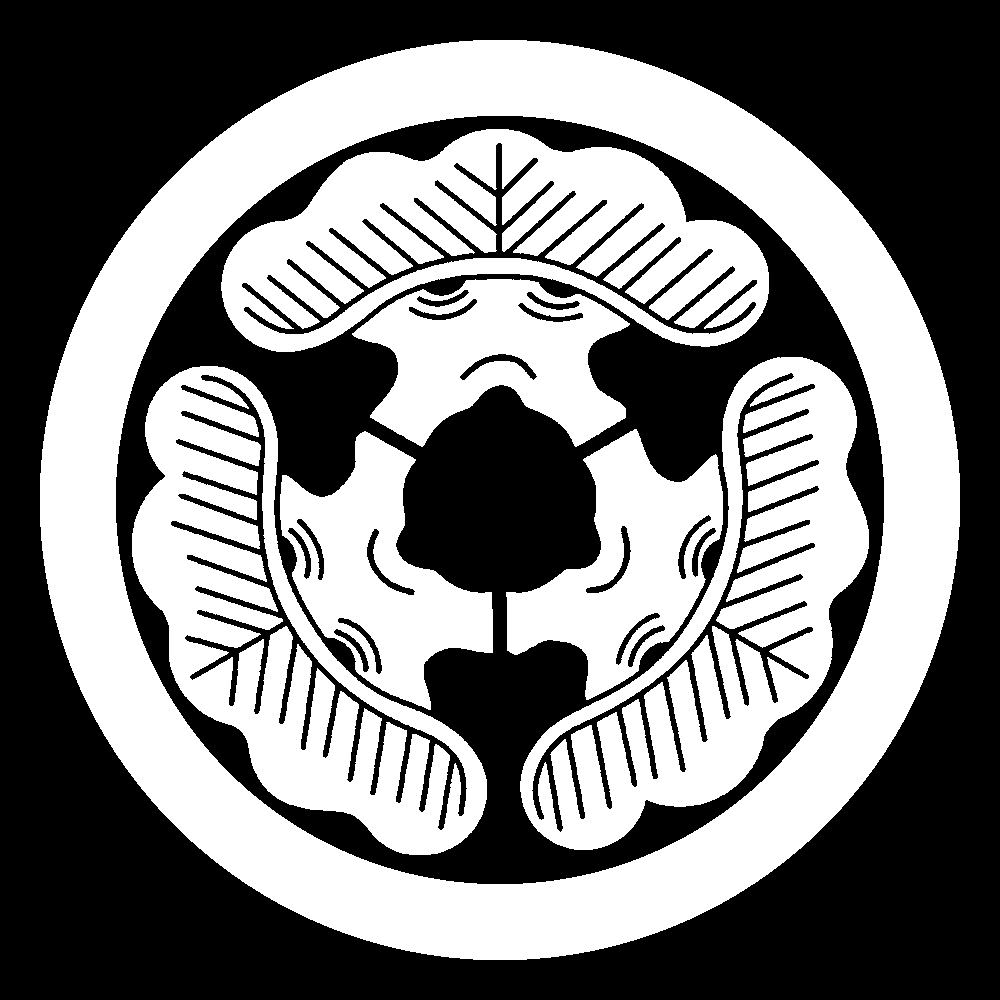

Baron Matsuoka Yasutake (松岡康毅; 14 August 1846 – 1 September 1923) was a legal scholar and cabinet minister in the pre-war Empire of Japan.

== Biography ==
Matsuoka was a native of Awa Province (modern-day Tokushima Prefecture), where his father was a samurai in the service of Tokushima Domain. After education at the domain academy, he went to Edo in 1861 for further studies, and to Osaka in 1863. Following the Meiji Restoration, in 1870, he returned to his native Tokushima, where he obtained a position as a bureaucrat within the prefectural office, and also serving as a legal councilor. In 1871, he was recruited into the central government, moving to Tokyo for a position within the Ministry of Justice. He subsequently worked as prosecutor and secretary in the courts in Tokyo and Kobe, and at the Appeals Court in Hiroshima (1882). In February 1886, he was sent overseas to study the court system in France and Germany, returning to Japan in November 1887 and joining the legal team assembled under Justice Minister Yamada Akiyoshi to draft improvements to Japan’s Civil Code. Matsuoka was appointed an assistant judge of the High Court in February 1888. In 1889, he assisted in the establishment of the Law School of Nihon University.

In October 1890, Matsuoka became head of the Tokyo Appeals Court. In June 1891, he was accepted a role as Prosecutor-General, and was given a seat in the House of Peers of the Diet of Japan in December of the same year. From 1894 to 1898, under the Second and Third Itō Cabinets, Matsuoka served as Vice-Minister for the Home Ministry, participating in numerous committees and bureaus.

Under the First Saionji Cabinet (1906–1908), Matsuoka was appointed Minister of Agriculture and Commerce. In August 1917, Matsuoka was awarded the title of baron (danshaku) in the kazoku peerage. He joined the Privy Council in November 1920, and was appointed first President of Nippon University in March 1922. He was killed on 1 September 1923, during the Great Kantō earthquake when his house in Hayama, Kanagawa collapsed.

== Family ==
Matsuoka married Mitsuko Komuro and had one son, Kinpei Matsuoka, a professor of law at Tokyo Imperial University. Baron Matsuoka's kamon represents three pine trees in a circle (丸に三階松).

== Honours ==
=== Peerage ===
- Baron (14 August 1917)

=== Court ranks ===
- Senior Seventh rank (正七位) - (1873)
- Junior Fourth rank (従四位) - (1886)
- Junior Third rank (従三位) - (1890)
- Senior Third rank (正三位) - (1896)
- Junior Second rank (従二位) - (1906)
- Junior First rank (従一位) - (1923)

=== Decorations ===
- Order of the Rising Sun Gold and Silver Star (29 May 1886)
- Order of the Sacred Treasure 3rd Class (27 December 1889)
- Order of the Sacred Treasure 2nd Class (30 March 1891)
- Order of the Sacred Treasure 1st Class (30 June 1902)
- Grand Cordon of the Order of the Rising Sun (1 April 1906)
- Grand Cordon of the Order of the Paulownia Flowers (10 November 1915)

Political offices
Preceded by Kiyoura Keigo	Minister of Agriculture & Commerce; January 1906 – July 1908	Succeeded by Ōura Kanetake
