= Ōkuma Shigenobu =

Prime Minister of Japan (1898, 1914–1916)

Marquess Ōkuma Shigenobu
- 大隈 重信
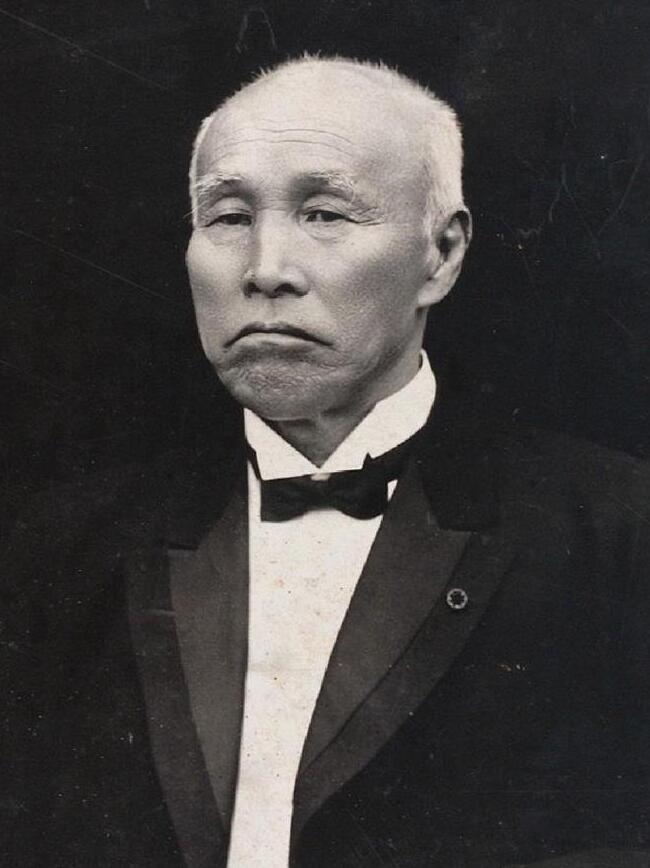
- Okuma in the 1910s

Prime Minister of Japan
- In office 16 April 1914 – 9 October 1916
- Monarch: Taishō
- Preceded by: Yamamoto Gonnohyōe
- Succeeded by: Terauchi Masatake
- In office 30 June 1898 – 8 November 1898
- Monarch: Meiji
- Preceded by: Itō Hirobumi
- Succeeded by: Yamagata Aritomo
Ministerial offices
Minister for Foreign Affairs
In office 10 August 1915 – 13 October 1915
Prime Minister	Himself
Preceded by	Katō Takaaki
Succeeded by	Ishii Kikujirō
In office 30 June 1898 – 8 November 1898
Prime Minister	Himself
Preceded by	Nishi Tokujirō
Succeeded by	Aoki Shūzō
In office 22 September 1896 – 6 November 1897
Prime Minister	Matsukata Masayoshi
Preceded by	Saionji Kinmochi
Succeeded by	Nishi Tokujirō
In office 1 February 1888 – 24 December 1889
Prime Minister	Itō Hirobumi; Kuroda Kiyotaka
Preceded by	Itō Hirobumi
Succeeded by	Aoki Shūzō
Minister of Home Affairs
In office 30 July 1915 – 10 August 1915
Prime Minister	Himself
Preceded by	Ōura Kanetake
Succeeded by	Ichiki Kitokurō
In office 16 April 1914 – 7 January 1915
Prime Minister	Himself
Preceded by	Hara Takashi
Succeeded by	Ōura Kanetake
Minister of Agriculture and Commerce
In office 29 March 1897 – 6 November 1897
Prime Minister	Matsukata Masayoshi
Preceded by	Enomoto Takeaki
Succeeded by	Yamada Nobumichi
Minister of Finance
In office 25 October 1873 – 28 February 1880
Monarch	Meiji
Preceded by	Ōkubo Toshimichi
Succeeded by	Sano Tsunetami

Member of the Privy Council
- In office 24 December 1889 – 12 November 1891
- Monarch: Meiji

Member of the House of Peers
- In office 14 July 1916 – 10 January 1922 Hereditary peerage

Personal details
- Born: 11 March 1838 Saga, Hizen, Japan
- Died: 10 January 1922 (aged 83) Shinjuku, Tokyo, Japan
- Party: Independent (1908–1914; 1916–1922)
- Other political affiliations: Rikken Kaishintō (1882–1896); Shimpotō (1896–1898); Kenseitō (1898–1908); Rikken Dōshikai (1914–1916)
- Spouse: Saegusa Ayako (m. 1869)

Marquess Ōkuma Shigenobu (Japanese: 大隈 重信; 11 March 1838 – 10 January 1922) was a Japanese statesman who was a leading figure in the Meiji and Taishō eras of Japan, serving as Prime Minister in 1898, and from 1914 to 1916. A key advocate for the adoption of Western science and culture in Japan, Ōkuma was a central figure in the country's modernization. He founded the political party Rikken Kaishintō and was an early proponent of parliamentary democracy. He is also the founder of Waseda University.

Born in Hizen Province (modern-day Saga Prefecture), Ōkuma was an early advocate for the abolition of the feudal system and the establishment of a constitutional government. As an "outsider" from Saga, he was a rare exception in the Satsuma-Chōshū clique that dominated the Meiji government. He joined the government in 1868 and rose to become Minister of Finance, a position in which he unified the nation's currency, created a national budget, and established the national mint. Following a political crisis in 1881, he was ousted from the government by his rivals. In opposition, he founded the Rikken Kaishintō and became one of the most prominent public figures championing a British-style parliamentary system.

Ōkuma returned to government as Foreign Minister in 1888 to work on treaty revision, but resigned after an assassination attempt by a nationalist in 1889 cost him his right leg. He later organized Japan's first party cabinet in 1898, serving as prime minister, though it collapsed after only four months. He returned to the premiership in 1914, leading Japan into World War I on the side of the Allies and formulating the Twenty-One Demands on China in 1915. Throughout his career, Ōkuma's populist and pro-modernization political style, his strong nationalism, and his unwavering advocacy for parliamentary rule made him one of the most influential statesmen of his generation. His national funeral in 1922 drew an unprecedented number of citizens.

== Early life ==
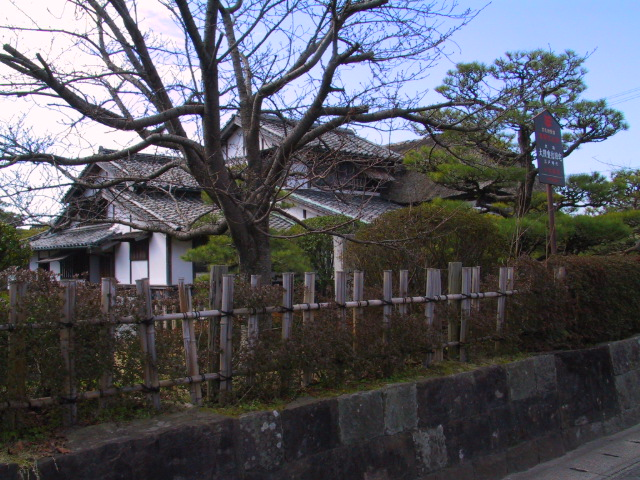
Ōkuma's childhood home in Saga

Ōkuma Shigenobu was born Hachitarō on 11 March 1838 in Saga, Hizen Province, the first son of a middle-ranking samurai family. His father, an artillery officer of the Saga Domain, died when Ōkuma was thirteen. As a youth, Ōkuma was a rebellious student who was expelled from the domain's official school, the Kōdōkan, at the age of seventeen after a dormitory fracas. He had a strong aversion to the traditional curriculum, particularly calligraphy and the Confucian classics. He later wrote that he "abhorred" the use of Chinese characters, calling them "the devil's characters" and a drag on Japan's intellectual progress.

After his expulsion, he joined a student group called the Gisai Dōmei (League of the Loyalist Festival), which was critical of the domain's administration. He soon transferred to a branch school of the Kōdōkan that focused on Rangaku (Dutch studies), where he learned the Dutch language and studied Western science, history, and military tactics. In the political ferment of the Bakumatsu period, Ōkuma sympathized with the Sonnō jōi (Revere the Emperor, Expel the Barbarian) movement. Around 1861, his domain sent him to Nagasaki to study English and constitutional law under the American missionary Guido Verbeck, who also introduced him to the New Testament and the Constitution of the United States.

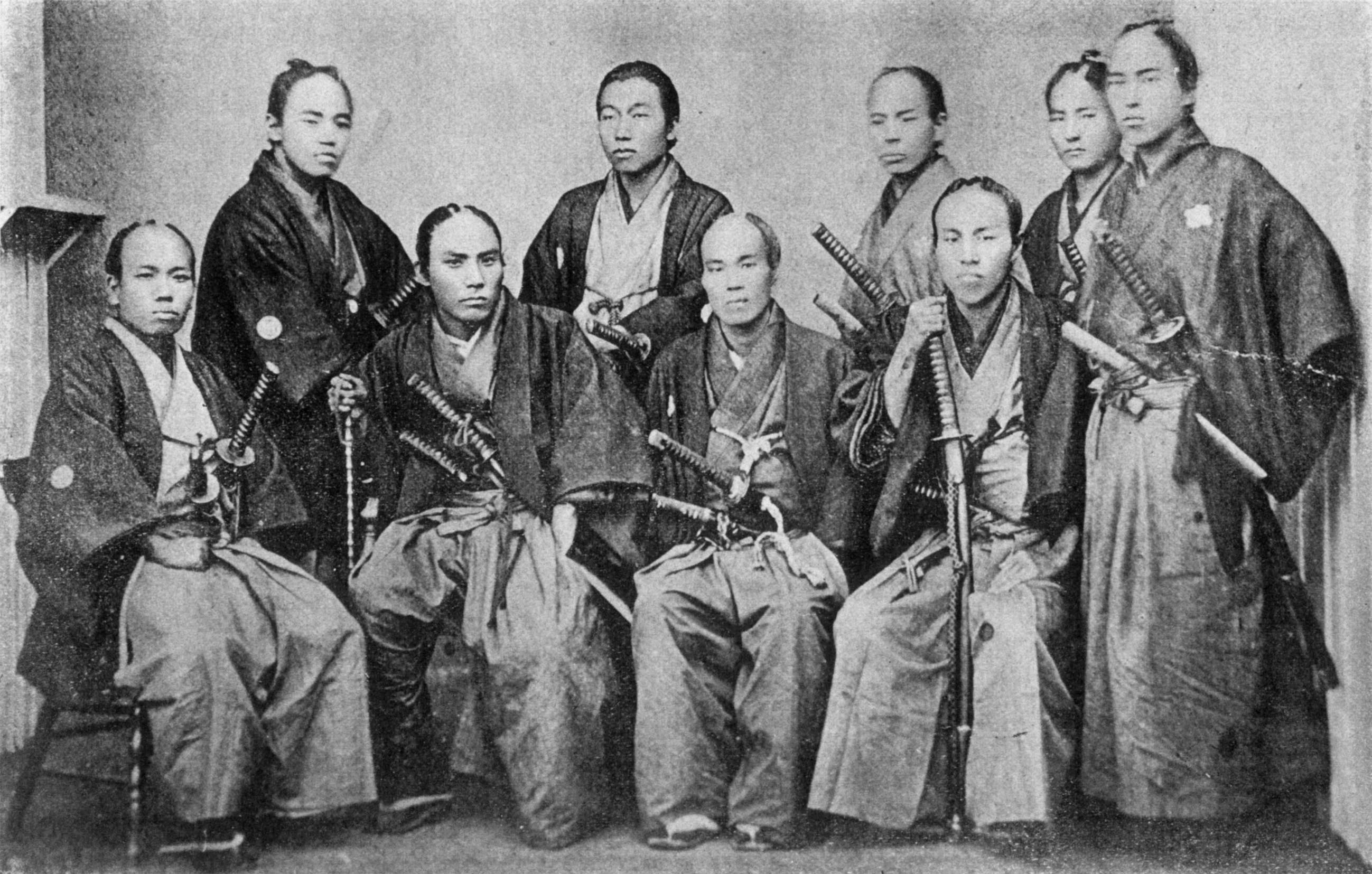
Ōkuma (seated on far right) with other samurai during his studies in Nagasaki, 1866

In Nagasaki, Ōkuma met and was influenced by leading figures from other domains, including Kido Takayoshi of Chōshū. Frustrated by the political conservatism of Hizen officials, he and a colleague attempted to abscond from the domain to join the loyalist forces in Kyoto but were captured and briefly imprisoned. His strong sense of nationalism and a belief that he had a destiny to fulfill in a time of national peril prevented him from accepting opportunities to study abroad. By the time of the Meiji Restoration in 1868, he had gained commercial expertise through the Hizen bureaucracy and had met many of the young patriots who would form the nucleus of the new Meiji leadership.

== Meiji government career (1868–1881) ==
Ōkuma's first appointment in the new government was to a commission overseeing the city of Nagasaki in January 1868. His talents were soon recognized by Inoue Kaoru of Chōshū, who in April recommended him for the post of san'yo (junior councillor) in the central government. Ōkuma was tasked with handling foreign relations, particularly the difficult issue of the persecution of Japanese Christians in Nagasaki. He gained the respect of foreign diplomats, including British Minister Harry Smith Parkes, with his firm but diplomatic handling of the crisis.

His expertise in both foreign and financial affairs led to his rapid promotion. In February 1869, he was appointed Vice-Minister of Foreign Affairs; in July of the same year he was appointed Vice-Minister of Civil Affairs, and in August he became Vice-Minister of Finance, holding the latter two posts concurrently. Under his leadership, with Itō Hirobumi as his subordinate, the government established a national mint, opened telecommunications, and secured a loan from Britain to build Japan's first railway. In 1870, Ōkuma became a sangi (councillor) and, with the support of Kido Takayoshi, became a central figure in the government's financial reforms. He was instrumental in the 1871 abolition of the han system and the creation of prefectures.

While much of the government, including leaders like Kido and Ōkubo Toshimichi, traveled abroad with the Iwakura Mission from 1871 to 1873, Ōkuma remained in Japan and oversaw a series of major reforms. These included the abolition of the eta caste, the legal prohibition of wearing swords for samurai, the adoption of the Gregorian calendar, and the establishment of a new land tax system. In 1873, he published Japan's first national budget, an early attempt to bring transparency and control to government expenditures. That same year, he became the official Minister of Finance. He opposed the proposed invasion of Korea in the Seikanron debate of 1873, arguing that Japan should prioritize domestic reform over foreign adventures. However, he supported the Taiwan Expedition of 1874 as a necessary outlet for discontented samurai. During the Saga Rebellion in his home province, Ōkuma remained detached, demonstrating his shift in loyalty from his domain to the national government.

Ōkuma's financial policies were aimed at creating a modern, unified economy. He worked with Ōkubo to devise a program for commuting the hereditary pensions of the samurai into government bonds, a crucial step in relieving the state of a massive financial burden. To fund the suppression of the Satsuma Rebellion in 1877, he resorted to issuing ¥27 million in irredeemable paper money, which led to severe inflation. To counter this, he later worked to establish the Yokohama Specie Bank to facilitate foreign exchange and stabilize the currency. He was also a strong supporter of nascent industrial enterprises, most notably providing government subsidies and privileges that helped build the Mitsubishi zaibatsu under Iwasaki Yatarō. As a political outsider from Hizen, Ōkuma lacked a strong regional power base and survived by navigating the rivalries between the dominant Satsuma and Chōshū factions, relying on the shifting patronage of figures like Kido, Ōkubo, and Inoue. After Ōkubo's assassination in May 1878, Ōkuma became one of the two central members of the government, alongside Itō Hirobumi. Ōkuma had a slight edge in seniority, but this was outweighed by Itō's stronger connection to the powerful Chōshū clique, whereas Ōkuma's home domain of Hizen was not known for its solidarity.

== Political Crisis of 1881 ==
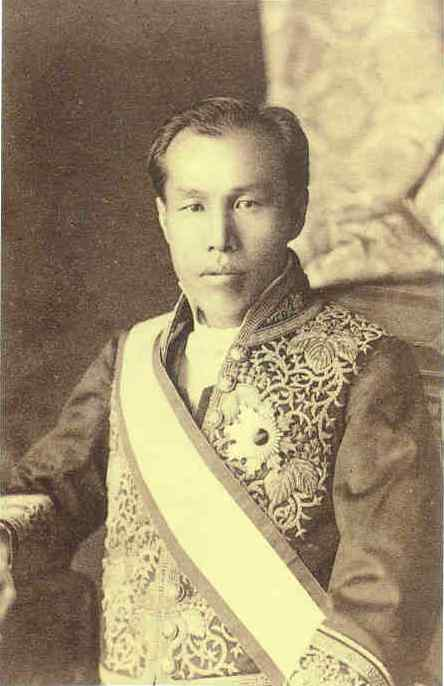
Ōkuma c. 1880s

By 1881, Ōkuma was one of the most powerful figures in the government. However, his influence was vulnerable in a government beset by financial problems and growing public demands for a constitution. The Freedom and People's Rights Movement was gaining momentum, and Ōkuma saw an opportunity to steer the government toward a British-style parliamentary system. In January 1881, at a conference in Atami with Itō Hirobumi and Inoue Kaoru, he agreed on the need for constitutional government but clashed with his colleagues over the timing and model.

In March 1881, Ōkuma submitted a memorial to the throne, drafted for him by his protégé Yano Fumio. It was a sophisticated and radical proposal for its time, calling for:

- The announcement of a date for the opening of a national diet (parliament).
- The establishment of a cabinet responsible to the diet, with the leader of the majority party serving as prime minister.
- The adoption of a British-style parliamentary system.
- The convening of the diet by early 1883.

This memorial set Ōkuma apart from the other oligarchs, who favored a more gradual, Prussian-inspired constitutional model that would preserve the power of the emperor and the executive branch. His proposal for a diet in less than two years was seen as dangerously hasty. His advocacy for a government accountable to political parties was a direct challenge to the power of the Satsuma-Chōshū clique. Itō, who had been a close colleague, became furious, viewing the memorial as a betrayal and a bid for popular support aimed at securing his own supremacy in the government.

The crisis came to a head over a scandal involving the proposed sale of government assets in Hokkaido to a firm with ties to Satsuma merchants. The proposed price was seen as scandalously low, and the press, much of it aligned with Ōkuma and his allies Fukuzawa Yukichi and Iwasaki Yatarō, attacked the deal as a corrupt bargain. Ōkuma was the only councillor to oppose the sale, and he was hailed in the press as a spokesman for the people. While Ōkuma was away from Tokyo accompanying the emperor on a tour, his Sat-Chō rivals, led by Itō, moved against him. They accused Ōkuma of colluding with Fukuzawa and Mitsubishi to overthrow the government. Itō, in a masterful political maneuver, convinced his Satsuma colleagues to join him in ousting Ōkuma in exchange for cancelling the unpopular sale. On 11 October 1881, the emperor returned, and that night, Ōkuma was presented with a demand for his resignation.

Ōkuma resigned on 12 October; he later blamed his ousting on the Satsuma faction. On the same day, the government cancelled the Hokkaido sale and issued an imperial edict promising a constitution and a diet, but not until 1890. The crisis marked a turning point in Meiji politics, fought and resolved primarily among the bureaucrats in the central government with little role for the popular movements outside. It ended with Ōkuma's expulsion, solidifying the Sat-Chō oligarchy's control and ensuring that Japan's constitution would be based on the Prussian, not the British, model. However, it also forced the government to commit to constitutionalism and accelerated the timetable for its implementation. Ōkuma, now purged from power, emerged as a popular hero and a champion of parliamentary democracy.

== Party leader and opposition (1882–1896) ==
After leaving government, Ōkuma founded the Rikken Kaishintō (Constitutional Reform Party) in March 1882, with the support of a group of intellectuals and a score of ambitious young bureaucrats who had been expelled from the government with him. The party advocated for moderate, British-style progressivism, standing in contrast to the more radical, French-influenced Jiyūtō (Liberal Party) founded by Itagaki Taisuke. The Kaishintō's leadership was notably national in character, drawing from diverse geographic and social backgrounds rather than being tied to a single domain, and appealing to urban intellectuals, journalists, and business interests.

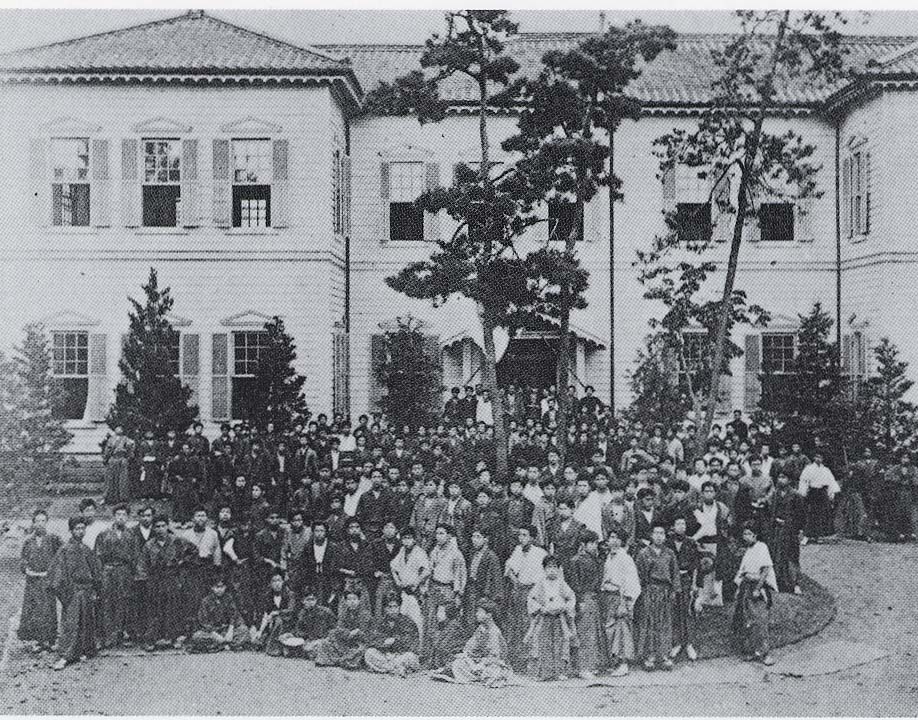
Students at the Tokyo Senmon Gakkō, 1884

In October 1882, in the midst of his political activities, Ōkuma founded the Tokyo Senmon Gakkō in the Waseda district of Tokyo. The school, which would later become Waseda University, was intended to train the next generation of leaders in the spirit of freedom and independence, providing an alternative to the government-run Tokyo Imperial University.

As an opposition leader, Ōkuma and his party faced significant government repression. Laws restricting public meetings and the press were used to harass the parties, and the government supported rival newspapers to counter the pro-Kaishintō press. Internal divisions and financial difficulties further weakened the party, and in 1884, following a party split, Ōkuma resigned as party president, though he remained its guiding influence.

In 1888, the government, seeking to quell popular opposition and advance treaty revision, invited Ōkuma to return as Foreign Minister in the cabinet of Prime Minister Kuroda Kiyotaka. Ōkuma accepted on the condition that the government commit to certain parliamentary principles, setting a precedent for party-cabinet cooperation. As Foreign Minister, he abandoned the previous strategy of negotiating with the Western powers jointly and instead pursued revisions with individual nations, securing an equal treaty with Mexico in 1888. However, his plan, which included appointing foreign judges to Japanese courts, provoked a nationalist backlash. On 18 October 1889, as he was leaving the Foreign Ministry, a nationalist from the Gen'yōsha threw a bomb at his carriage. The attack cost Ōkuma his right leg, and he resigned from the cabinet.

== Party cabinets and premierships ==
=== First premiership ===
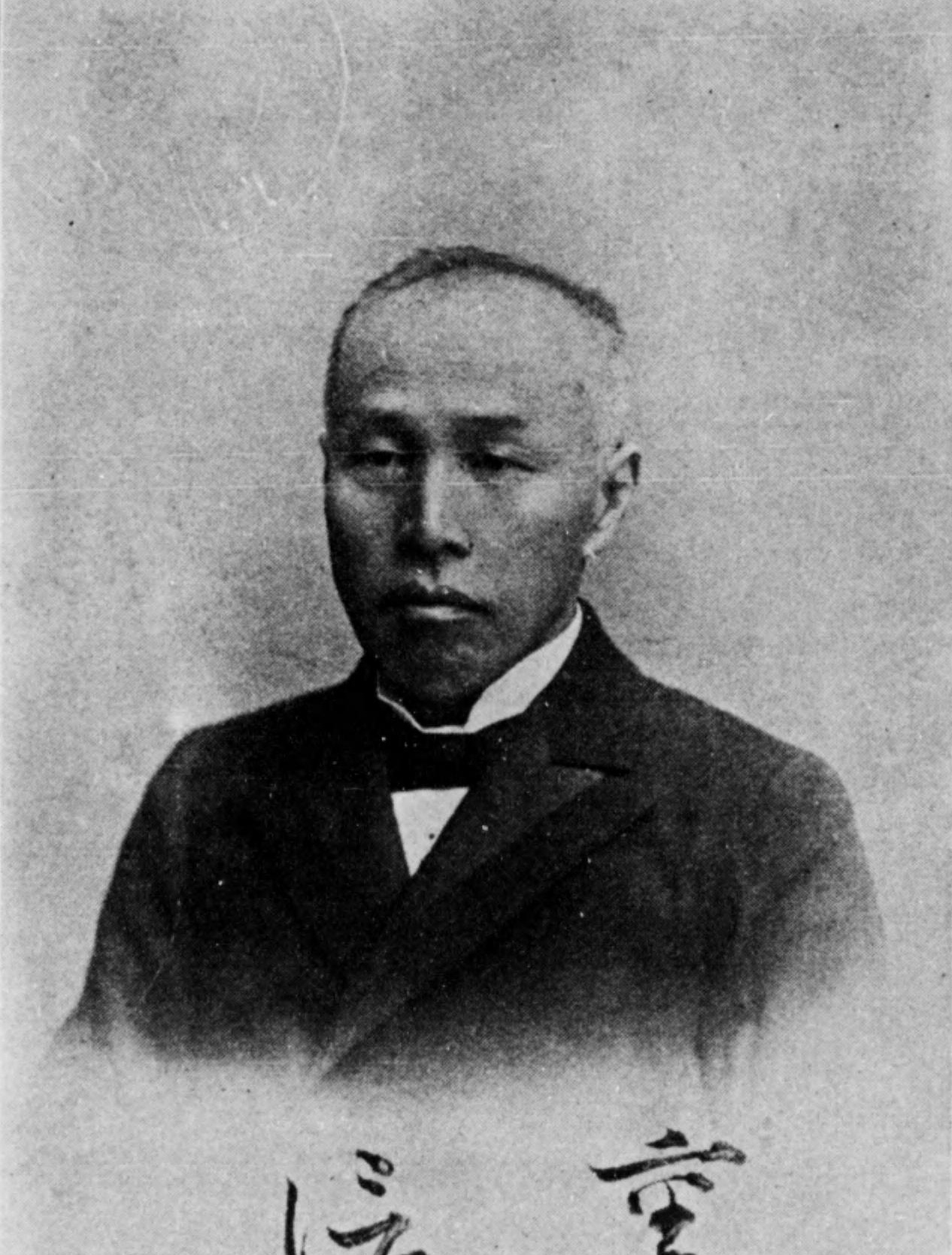
Ōkuma in 1902

After seven years out of office, Ōkuma returned to the cabinet in 1896 as Foreign Minister in the second Matsukata cabinet. This marked the first time a Japanese prime minister had sought formal collaboration with a political party, the Shimpotō (Progressive Party), which was the successor to Ōkuma's Kaishintō. Ōkuma accepted on the condition that those with popular confidence be appointed to state ministries, that freedom of speech and the press be respected, and that talented men from outside the bureaucracy be appointed to government posts. The coalition was fragile, however, and collapsed in 1897 over disagreements on tax policy and cabinet appointments, with Ōkuma and his party withdrawing their support.

The growing power of the parties led to a historic development in June 1898, when the Shimpotō and the Jiyūtō merged to form the Kenseitō (Constitutional Government Party). Faced with a united opposition that commanded a majority in the House of Representatives, the genrō (elder statesmen), at Itō Hirobumi's urging, had little choice but to ask the party leaders to form a government. On 30 June 1898, Ōkuma became Prime Minister, with Itagaki Taisuke as Home Minister, in what is considered Japan's first party cabinet. The cabinet was plagued by internal factionalism from the start. The former Jiyūtō and Shimpotō factions quarreled over the distribution of cabinet posts, with the Shimpotō securing posts and spoils, with the Shimpotō securing five posts to the Jiyūtō's three, creating considerable resentment. The cabinet collapsed after just four months when the Jiyūtō faction, led by Hoshi Tōru, defected, dissolving the party before the cabinet had even faced a session of the Diet.

=== Second premiership ===
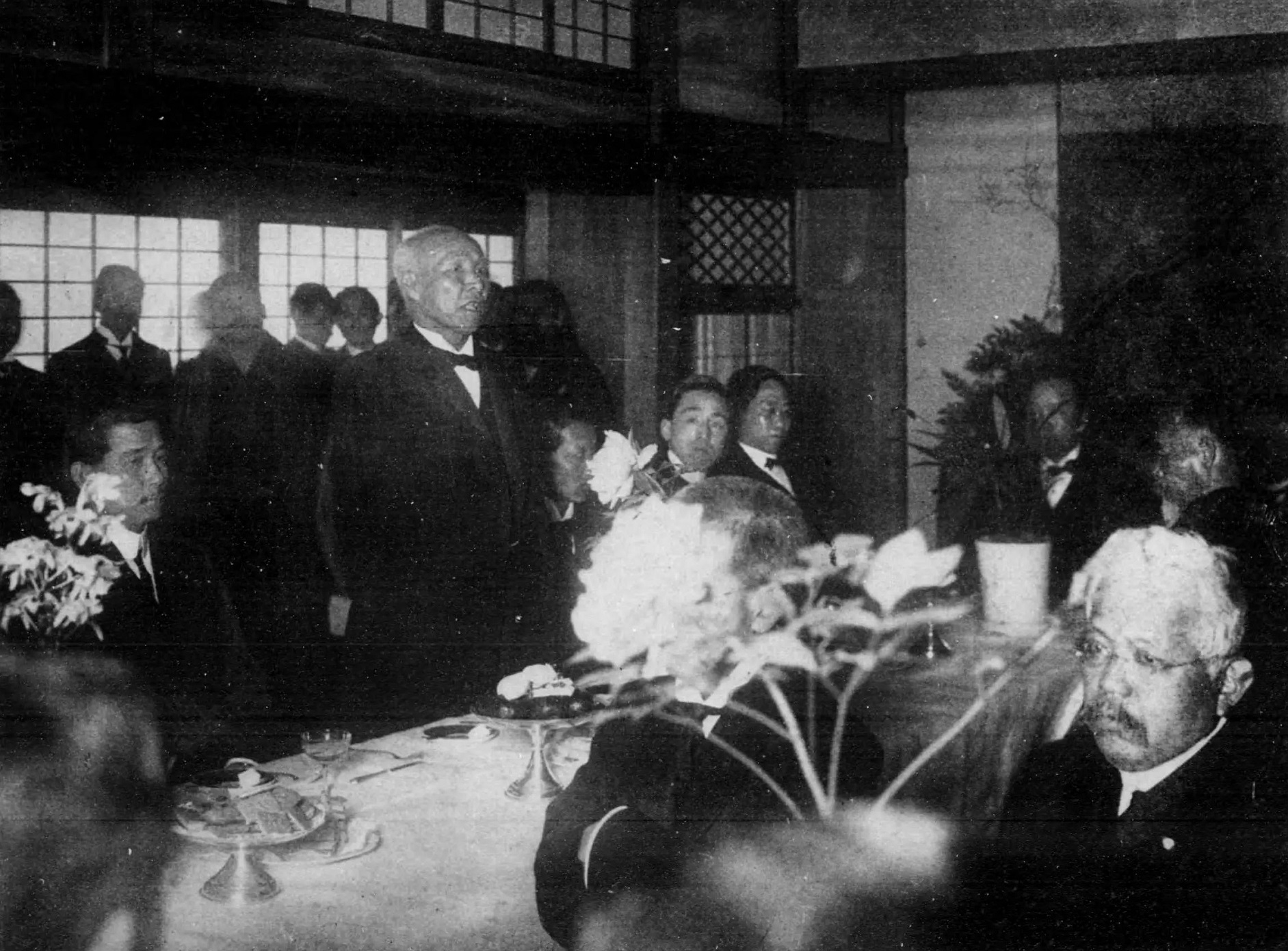
Ōkuma speaking at a welcome reception for Sun Yat-sen, 1913

Ōkuma remained a central figure in party politics, becoming president of the Kenseihontō, the successor to his wing of the old Kenseitō, and leading the opposition for over a decade. In 1914, after the Siemens scandal brought down the Yamamoto Gonnohyōe cabinet, the genrō, looking for a figure with popular appeal who could lead a "crushing blow against the Seiyūkai" party, once again turned to Ōkuma. At the age of 76, he became Prime Minister for the second time. His cabinet was formed with the expectation of support from the Rikken Dōshikai, the party launched by his predecessor Katsura Tarō. The real leader of the cabinet was Foreign Minister Katō Takaaki, a man whose admiration for British institutions was unpopular with conservatives.

His second premiership coincided with the outbreak of World War I. Ōkuma's cabinet declared war on Germany, siding with the Allies, and seized German territories in China and the Pacific. In 1915, his government presented the Twenty-One Demands to China, an attempt to expand Japanese political and economic influence which drew international condemnation. The demands had been formulated by Katō, who was ultimately forced to resign by the genrō in July 1915 due to his handling of the affair. Domestically, his tenure was marked by the 1915 general election, which ended the Seiyūkai's long dominance of the Diet. The victory for Ōkuma's coalition was achieved through widespread government interference in the election orchestrated by Home Minister Ōura Kanetake, who was later forced to resign over the resulting Ōura scandal. As premier, Ōkuma introduced modern political techniques, holding the first cabinet press conferences and actively campaigning during elections, though his populist style was viewed with disdain by the genrō. He resigned in 1916 after failing to secure the appointment of his chosen successor, Katō Takaaki, against the wishes of the genrō.

== Later life and death ==
Ōkuma spent his final years out of political office, focusing on his work at Waseda University and writing. He remained a respected public figure, an elder statesman whose views were widely sought on national and international affairs.

Ōkuma died on 10 January 1922 at the age of 83. His funeral at Hibiya Park in Tokyo was a major national event, with an estimated crowd of one and a half million people lining the streets to pay their respects. It was the first national funeral not for a head of state or military hero, but for a statesman and citizen, reflecting his immense popularity and his role as a "precursor of mass democracy."

== Legacy ==
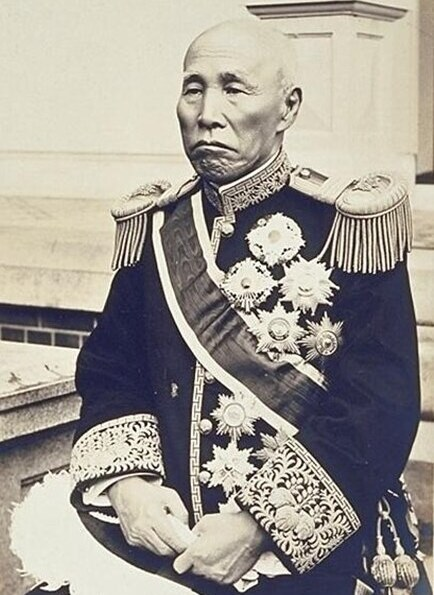
Ōkuma in his later years

Ōkuma Shigenobu was a central figure in Japan's transition from a feudal society to a modern nation-state. As a government minister in the early Meiji period, he played a crucial role in modernizing Japan's financial and industrial systems. As a party politician, he was the most prominent and persistent champion of British-style parliamentary democracy, advocating for a government responsible to the people rather than to an unaccountable oligarchy. His famous 1881 dictum, "Constitutional government is party government", was a revolutionary idea that, though rejected at the time, eventually became a reality in Taishō and postwar Japan.

He was a political innovator who understood the power of mass media and public opinion far earlier than his contemporaries. His use of the press, public speeches, and campaign tours set him apart from the more traditional and aloof Meiji oligarchs and made him a "prototypal popular statesman". Ōkuma was also a lifelong advocate for education. He founded Waseda University, which became a major private institution known for its political and legal studies, and he supported the establishment of Japan Women's University, reflecting a revolutionary belief in women's right to higher education. His intellectual interests were broad, encompassing Western political philosophy, science, and the arts, and he envisioned Japan as a bridge between Eastern and Western civilizations.

A man of many paradoxes, Ōkuma was a Westernized modernizer who never traveled abroad, a democratic iconoclast with deep roots in the samurai tradition, and a populist who maintained close ties with business elites. His political career was marked by both great success and spectacular failure, but his resilience, optimism, and unwavering commitment to his ideals left an indelible mark on modern Japanese history.

Ōkuma's house in the city of Saga still exists, and is part of the Okuma Shigenobu Memorial Museum complex. This building was purchased by Ōkuma Kumanosuke in 1838, and was the residence of Ōkuma from his birth until he departed Saga for Tokyo in 1868. The structure consists of a single-story tatch-roof portion and a two-story tile-roof portion. It is said that the second floor was added by Shigenobu's mother to provide her son with a study. Although the house is in good preservation, there are signs of remodeling at the entrance, and the kitchen has been removed and an administration room added at a later date. It was designated a National Historic Site in 1965.

== Honours ==
=== Peerages ===
- Count (9 May 1887)
- Marquess (14 July 1916)

=== Decorations ===
- Grand Cordon of the Order of the Rising Sun (2 November 1877)
- Grand Cordon of the Order of the Rising Sun with Paulownia Flowers (29 April 1910)
- Collar of the Order of the Chrysanthemum (10 January 1922, posthumous; Grand Cordon: 14 July 1916)

=== Court order of precedence ===
- Fifth rank, junior grade (1867)
- Fourth rank, junior grade (1868)
- Senior fourth rank (1870)
- Third rank (22 July 1871)
- Senior third rank (26 December 1887)
- Second rank (17 February 1888)
- Senior second rank (20 June 1898)
- Junior First Rank (10 January 1922)

Political offices
Preceded by Itō Hirobumi	Minister of Foreign Affairs; 1888–1889	Succeeded by Aoki Shūzō
Preceded by Saionji Kinmochi	Minister of Foreign Affairs; 1896–1897	Succeeded by Nishi Tokujirō
Preceded by Nishi Tokujirō	Minister of Foreign Affairs; 1898	Succeeded by Aoki Shūzō
Preceded by Katō Takaaki	Minister of Foreign Affairs; 1915	Succeeded by Ishii Kikujirō
Preceded by Hara Takashi	Minister of Home Affairs; 1914–1915	Succeeded by Ōura Kanetake
Preceded by Ōura Kanetake	Minister of Home Affairs; 1915	Succeeded by Ichiki Kitokurō
Preceded by Enomoto Takeaki	Minister of Agriculture and Commerce; 1897	Succeeded by Yamada Nobumichi
Preceded by Itō Hirobumi	Prime Minister of Japan; 1898	Succeeded by Yamagata Aritomo
Preceded by Yamamoto Gonnohyōe	Prime Minister of Japan; 1914–1916	Succeeded by Terauchi Masatake
Academic offices
New office	President of Waseda University; 1907–1922	Succeeded by Masasada Shiozawa
