= Katsura cabinet =

Katsura Cabinet may refer to:

- First Katsura Cabinet, the Japanese government led by Katsura Tarō from 1901 to 1906
- Second Katsura Cabinet, the Japanese government led by Katsura Tarō from 1908 to 1911
- Third Katsura Cabinet, the Japanese government led by Katsura Tarō from 1912 to 1913
