= Saionji Cabinet =

Saionji Cabinet may refer to:

- First Saionji Cabinet, the Japanese government led by Saionji Kinmochi from 1906 to 1908
- Second Saionji Cabinet, the Japanese government led by Saionji Kinmochi from 1911 to 1912
