= Boissonade =

Boissonade is a surname. Notable people with the surname include:

- Jean François Boissonade de Fontarabie, (1774–1857), French classical scholar
- Gustave Emile Boissonade de Fontarabie, (1825–1910), French legal scholar, responsible for drafting much of Japan's civil code
