= Keijō Imperial University =

1924–1946 university in Keijō, Japanaese Korea

- 京城帝國大學
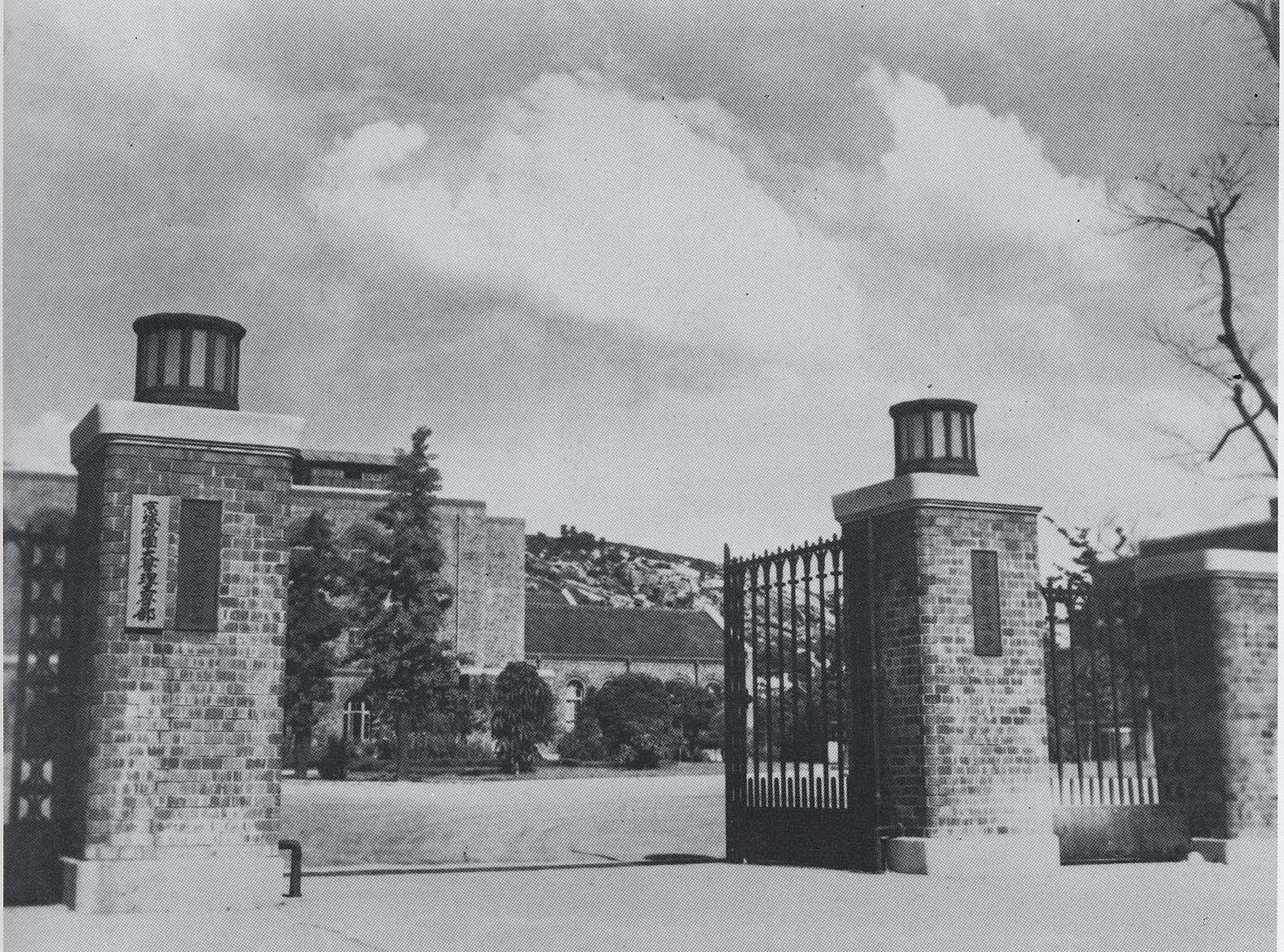
- Type: National
- Active: 1924–August 1946
- Location: Keijō (Seoul), Keiki-dō, Korea, Empire of Japan

Keijō Imperial University (Note: Japanese: 京城帝國大學, romanized: Keijō Teikoku Daigaku; Abbreviated name Japanese: 城大, romanized: Jōdai; Korean: 경성제국대학; RR: Gyeongseong jeguk daehak; MR: Kyŏngsŏng cheguk taehak.) was an Imperial University in Keijō (Seoul), Korea, Empire of Japan that existed between 1924 and 1946.

The university was seen as the preeminent educational institution in colonial Korea. Upon the 1945 liberation of Korea, it was briefly renamed Kyŏngsŏng University, was seized by the United States Army Military Government in Korea (USAMGIK) in 1946, and reorganized into its successor: the present Seoul National University.

== History ==
In 1923, an organization called the Korea Private University Foundation Committee (조선민립대학기성회; 朝鮮民立大學期成會) was formed. Its founding leader was Yi Sang-jae. In response to their activism, the Japanese Government-General of Chōsen agreed to a proposal (경성제국대학령) to found a university in Korea.

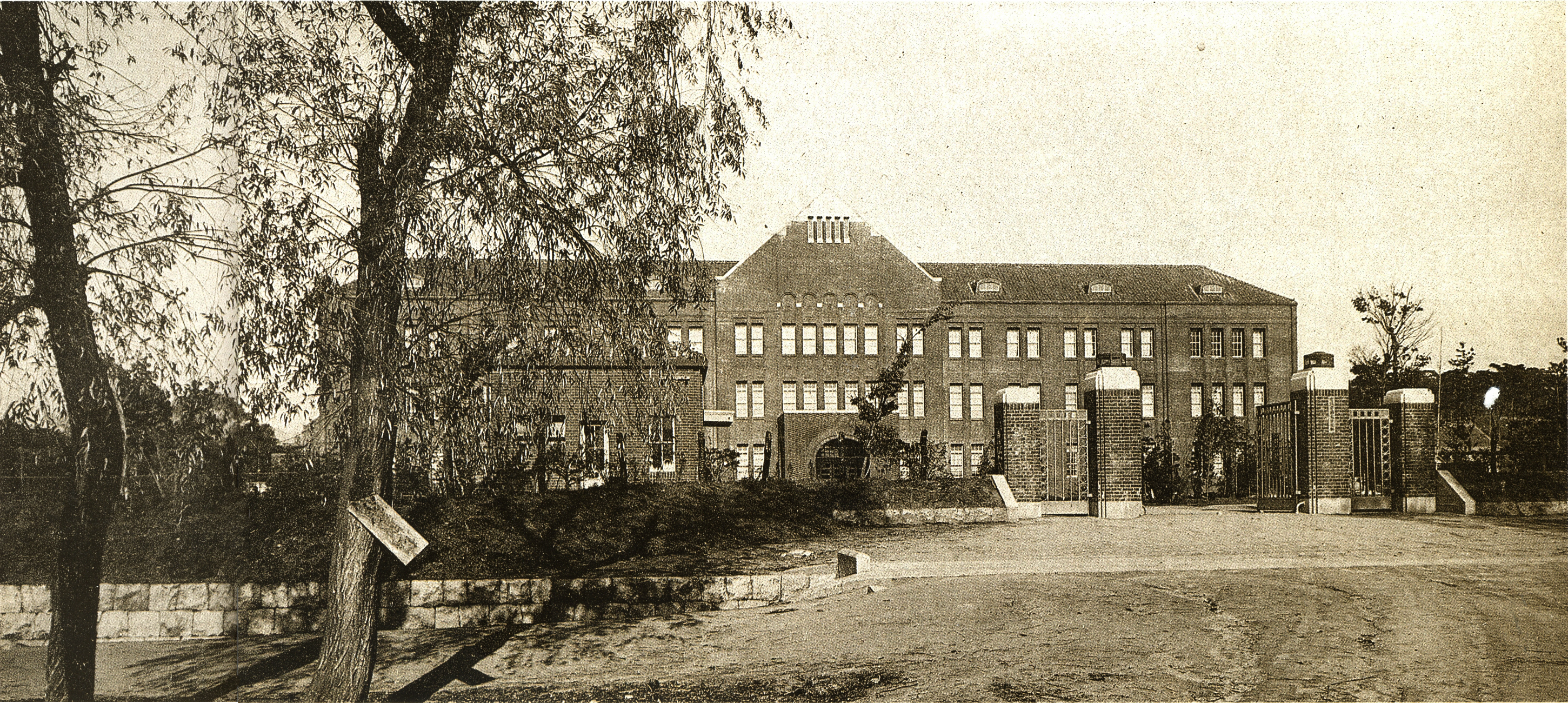
Keijō Imperial University Preliminary School

Keijō Imperial University was founded in 1924. For the first two years, students were enrolled only in the preparatory education division (予科), which was similar to the Higher Schools in mainland Japan, except it was a year shorter and included Japanese language instruction for Korean students, as most faculty members were Japanese. When the first group of students completed their preparatory education in 1926, three-year programs for law and literature were introduced, along with a four-year medical program.

They began gradually adding new programs over time, based on what was deemed important for colonial Korea. An article in the Encyclopedia of Korean Culture argues that science and engineering programs were deliberately not introduced until around Japan's entry into World War II. The article argues this was because Japan wanted to avoid disseminating technical and scientific knowledge to Koreans. Research activities were limited, and there were maximum quotas for how many Koreans were allowed to be admitted. An alumnus of the university testified in 2010 that bureaucrats were held in much higher esteem than engineers and scientists in colonial Korea, which led to the law program becoming excessively popular.

In 1928, a hospital affiliated with the university finished construction. In April 1929, it graduated its first class of 90 law and literature students, 22 of whom were ethnic Koreans. In 1930, it graduated its first class of 55 medical students, with 12 Koreans. In March 1934, it extended the liberal arts program to three years. In 1938, it established a science and engineering department, and increased the class sizes for that program in 1941.

After the liberation of Korea, Keijō Imperial University was renamed to "Gyeongseong University" (경성대학; 京城大學). After the war, it was no longer considered a Japanese university, and it was closed by the USAMGIK on August 22, 1946, under US Military Ordinance No. 102. While speaking to Korean officials, the U.S. Military Governor stated that the U.S. "gave a basic law enacted which will place our national university on a level equal to the best in the world."

The remaining properties of Keijo University merged with Gyeongseong Industrial School, Gyeongseong Mine School, Gyeongseong Medical School, Suwon Agriculture School, Gyeongseong Economics School, Gyeongseong Dental Medicine School, Gyeongseong Normal School and Gyeongseong Women's Normal School into Seoul National University. Additionally, Seoul National University College of Medicine was established in 1946 through the merger of Keijō Medical School and Keijō Imperial University.

== Activities ==
Keijō Imperial University published original articles and abstracts in journals including Shinkeigaku-zassi (Neurologia), Seishin-shinkei-gaku zassi (Psychiatria Et Neurologia Japonica), and The Journal of Chosun.

The Keijō Imperial University research team organised and conducted field studies on sampling of blood typing, as well as physical anthropology research from people representative of the Korean Peninsula. The gathering of men and women by local police and administrative power had been conducted as measuring them was necessary for the progression of Keijō Imperial University's physical anthropology research. In 1937, Keijō Imperial University extended its research of physical anthropology field studies to Manchuria and China. Keijō Imperial University's field studies in Korea, Manchuria and China were financially supported by the Japanese government and research foundations.

Controversies surrounding Keijō Imperial University's research of physical anthropology and blood typing is related to the use of a racial index [R.I. (= A%+AB%/B%+AB%)]. Professor Ock Joo Kim of Seoul National University states "the Japanese researchers put Koreans as a race between the Mongolian and the Japanese. The preoccupation with constitution and race also pervasively affected the medical practice: race (Japanese, Korean, or Japanese living in Korea) must be written in every kind of medical chart as a default".

== Faculties and divisions ==
=== Law and literature ===
- The division of law and literature encapsulated studies belonging to law, literature, history and philosophy.
- At Keijō Imperial University, students had the opportunity to publish their literary works. In a preparatory literature course, students published in the magazine titled 'Seiryo'. In a regular course, students had the publish their literary works in the magazine titled 'Jōdai Bungaku'.
- Western History Education at Keijō Imperial University was offered as a study at the university.

=== Medicine ===
- Seoul National University College of Medicine was established in 1946 after the abolishment of Keijō Imperial University by the merger of Keijō Medical School and Keijō Imperial University. The first class graduated in 1947.
- The Governor-General of Korea's Office Hospital was developed into a hospital attached to the faculty of medicine at Keijō Imperial University in 1928. The hospital had a psychiatry ward which was the only psychiatric institution in Korea at the time. Results shared by Keijō Imperial University psychiatrics Kubo Kiyoji and Hattori Rokuro, the psychiatric ward had admitted 576 Japanese patients, and 508 Korean patients from its establishment to 1930.
- Keijō Imperial University only had about 40 beds for psychiatric patients in 1928.
- Keijō Imperial University was under the jurisdiction of the Governor-General. As there was not enough funding for both Keijō Imperial University's medical department alongside the Governor-General of Korea Hospital, therefore, staff from the Governor-General's Hospital were transferred to Keijō Imperial University's medical department. At the Keijō Medical Professional School, professors, assistant professors and assistants lectured in Mental Science. The hospital connected to the university was expanded to have 222 beds with a total of 35 physicians, with staff including directors, medical officers as well as professors. Keijō Imperial University's medical department contributed towards the Japanese Society of Psychiatry and Neurology up until 1945 by members of the medical department and professors of psychiatry. Studies at Keijō Imperial University included publications on insanity, symptomatic psychosis, sleep disorder, epidemiology, alcohol and morphine addiction, and schizophrenia.
- Keijō Imperial University was the only institution in Korea to have psychiatric beds until 1931 when a psychiatric was established within the Severance Union Medical School Hospital.
- Twenty-nine research papers and abstracts on psychiatric treatments were presented and reviewed at Keijō Imperial University. Major research areas included biological psychiatry and biological treatment. During this time, Japanese psychiatrists had introduced German psychiatry into Japan and Keijō Imperial University. Professors who contributed towards this research included Professor Kubo, Dr. Hattori, Dr. Hikari and Professor Suits. Malarial fever therapy, as well as sulphur-induced fever therapy and insulin shock treatment were frequent research topics at Keijō Imperial University. Six more papers on psychotherapy were published at the university, two being on persuasion therapy, three being case reports on psychoanalytic therapy, and one paper being on Sigmund Freud. Psychoanalytical therapy research has shown evidence that there had been limited triads conducted in the follow-up of literal guidance, where further development was not noted.
- Keijō Imperial University also conducted studies relating to pharmacology, psychology, pathology and parasitology. Amongst these, topics for medical research included the research into control of infectious diseases, hygiene and environmental health for Japanese and Koreans.
- It also hosted early experiments introduced by Akira Akao on the biological essentiality of zinc.

=== Engineering and natural science ===
- This faculty or division was established in 1938 before the outbreak of World War II.

== Statistics ==
=== 1930s ===
For Korean individuals, admission into Keijō Imperial University was a very competitive process as the admission of Korean students was restricted to between one-fourth and one-third of the total number of enrolled students at Keijō Imperial University. By 1930, six years after Keijō University was established, the number of enrolled students was at 520. This was equivalent to 6.7 percent of the number of students enrolled at Tokyo Imperial University. Japanese students made up the majority of the students enrolled. Amongst two thousand graduates during the colonial period, the number of Korean graduates was at seven hundred, the other thirteen hundred being Japanese. In 1934, the total enrolment of the Keijō Imperial University was 930 students. The percentage of Korean students which made up this number was of 32%. Although the Korean percentage rose in the coming years, namely in 1942 where the percentage of Korean students was at 39%.

=== 1940s ===
In 1943, Keijō Imperial University had 67 professors and 203 students who were Japanese. Three professors and 170 students were Korean.

=== Graduate statistics ===
150 students received a doctor of medicine degree from Keijō Imperial University.

== Faculty and alumni ==
=== Presidents ===
1. Chūichi Ariyoshi (有吉 忠一, Ariyoshi Chūichi; 아리요시 주이치) May 1924 – July 1924
2. Shimooka Chūji (下岡 忠治, Shimooka Chūji; 시모오카 다다하루) July 1924 – November 1925
3. Yuasa Kurahei (湯浅 倉平, Yuasa Kurahei; 유아사 구라헤이) December 1925 – April 1926
4. Unokichi Hattori (服部 宇之吉, Hattori Unokichi; 핫토리 우노키치) April 1926 – July 1927
5. Yasujirō Matsuura (松浦 鎮次郎, Matsuura Yasujirō; 마쓰우라 야스지로) July 1927 – October 1929
6. Kiyoshi Shiga (志賀 潔, Shiga Kiyoshi; 시가 기요시) October 1929 – October 1931
7. Saburō Yamada (山田 三良, Yamada Saburō; 야마다 사부로) October 1931 – January 1936
8. Hiroshi Hayami (速水 滉, Hayami Hiroshi; 하야미 히로시) January 1936 – July 1940
9. Jisaku Shinoda (篠田 治策, Shinoda Jisaku; 시노다 지사쿠) July 1940 – March 1944
10. Shinji Yamaga (山家 信次, Yamaga Shinji; 야마가 신지) March 1944 – August 1945

=== Faculty ===
- Yoshishige Abe - literature
- Reginald Horace Blyth - English author, taught English and Latin
- Paek Nam-un - Korean Marxist, taught economic history
- Motoki Tokieda - taught linguistics
- Hiroshi Nakamura - biochemist and historian
- Shinji Suitsu
- Akiba Takashi
- Suzuki Eitaro
- Hattori Rokuro
- T. Kawamura
- Kiyoki Kubo – Kubo was offered a professorship at Keijō Imperial University when the medical school was established.

Most of the staff at Keijō Imperial University specialised in the fields of physical anthropology, publishing and composing a series of works on Korean physical anthropology which were included within the Journal of the Anthropological Society of Nippon.

=== Alumni ===
- Yi Hyoseok - Korean writer
- Shin Hyun-hwak - South Korean prime minister
- Choi Byun-ju - former Korean Supreme Court justice and politician
- Rimhak Ree - Korean Canadian mathematician

== See also ==
- Imperial Universities
- Seoul National University
