= Chūichi =

- Gender: Male

Origin
- Origin: Japanese
- Meaning: Different meanings depending on the kanji used

Chūichi, Chuichi or Chuuichi (written: 忠一) is a masculine Japanese given name. Notable people with the name include:

- Chūichi Ariyoshi (有吉 忠一; 1873–1947), Japanese politician
- Chuichi Date (伊達 忠一; born 1939), Japanese politician
- Chūichi Hara (原 忠一; 1889–1964), Japanese admiral
- Chūichi Nagumo (南雲 忠一; 1887–1944), Japanese admiral
