= Yamamoto Cabinet =

Yamamoto Cabinet may refer to:

- First Yamamoto Cabinet, the Japanese government led by Yamamoto Gonnohyōe from 1913 to 1914
- Second Yamamoto Cabinet, the Japanese government led by Yamamoto Gonnohyōe from 1923 to 1924
