= Okano Keijirō =

Japanese politician

Junior Second Rank Baron Okano Keijirō
- 岡野 敬次郎
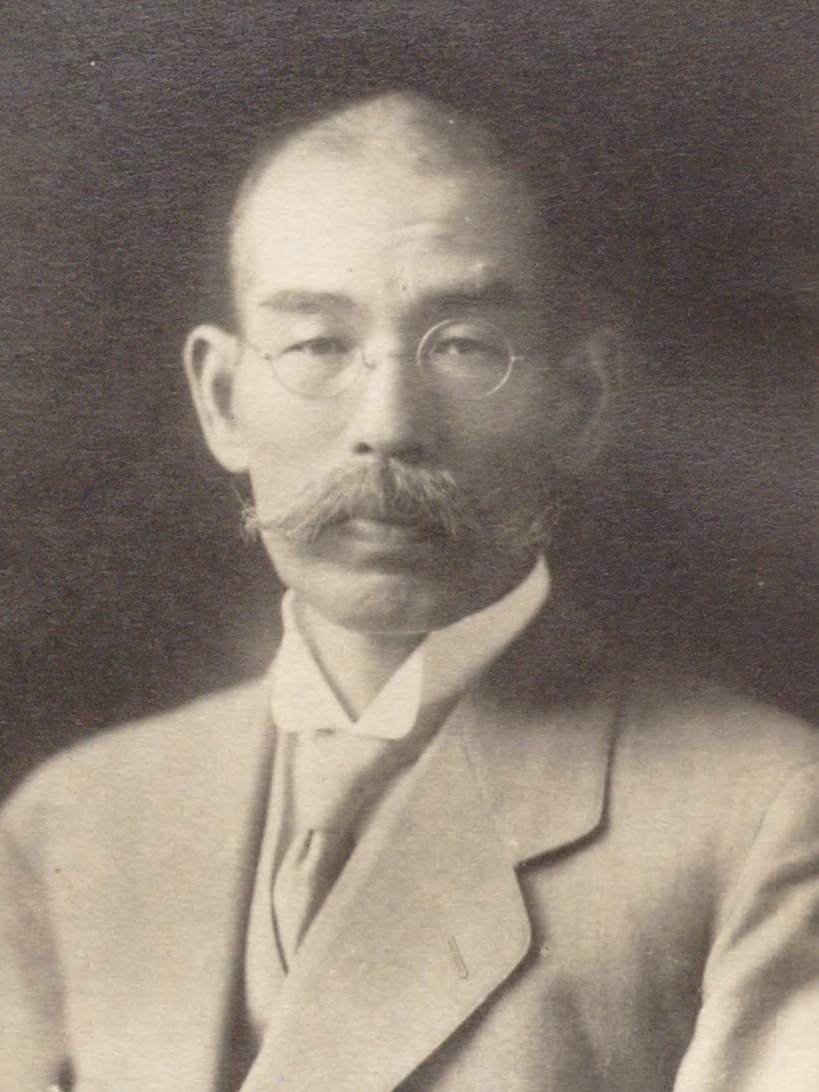

Vice President of the Privy Council
- In office 1 October 1925 – 23 December 1925
- Monarch: Taishō
- President: Hozumi Nobushige
- Preceded by: Hozumi Nobushige
- Succeeded by: Yūzaburō Kuratomi
Ministerial offices
Minister of Agriculture and Commerce
In office 24 December 1923 – 7 January 1924
Prime Minister	Yamamoto Gonnohyōe
Preceded by	Den Kenjirō
Succeeded by	Maeda Toshisada
Minister of Education
In office 6 September 1923 – 7 January 1924
Prime Minister	Yamamoto Gonnohyōe
Preceded by	Inukai Tsuyoshi
Succeeded by	Egi Kazuyuki
Minister of Justice
In office 12 June 1922 – 2 September 1923
Prime Minister	Katō Tomosaburō
Preceded by	Enkichi Ōki
Succeeded by	Den Kenjirō
Director-General of the Legislative Bureau
In office 20 February 1913 – 20 September 1913
Prime Minister	Yamamoto Gonnohyōe
Preceded by	Ichiki Kitokurō
Succeeded by	Yūzaburō Kuratomi
In office 31 August 1911 – 21 December 1912
Prime Minister	Saionji Kinmochi
Preceded by	Ban'ichirō Yasuhiro
Succeeded by	Ichiki Kitokurō
In office 13 January 1906 – 14 July 1908
Prime Minister	Saionji Kinmochi
Preceded by	Ichiki Kitokurō
Succeeded by	Ban'ichirō Yasuhiro

Member of the House of Peers
- In office 28 December 1908 – 9 October 1925 Nominated by the Emperor

Personal details
- Born: 21 September 1865 Iwahana, Kōzuke, Japan
- Died: 23 December 1925 (aged 60) Ōiso, Kanagawa, Japan
- Education: Kaisei Academy
- Alma mater: Tokyo Imperial University

Baron Okano Keijirō (岡野 敬次郎; 21 September 1865 – 23 December 1925) was a legal scholar, a politician and cabinet minister in the pre-war Empire of Japan.

== Biography ==
Okano was a native of Kōzuke Province (modern-day Gunma Prefecture). He graduated from the Kaisei Academy, followed by the Law School of Tokyo Imperial University, continuing on to graduate school to obtain a Doctor of law degree. He became professor of Tokyo Imperial University (See Keijirō Okano [:ja:]). He worked as a bureaucrat at various cabinet ministries in the Meiji government, and was appointed to a seat in the Upper House of the Diet of Japan in 1908. He served as Director-General of the Cabinet Legislation Bureau under the First and Second Saionji Cabinets (1906–1908; 1911–1912), and the First Yamamoto Cabinet (1913). From 1913 to 1922, Okano served as Secretary to the Administrative Court.

In 1922, Okano was appointed Minister of Justice in the cabinet of Prime Minister Katō Tomosaburō. In the subsequent Second Yamamoto Cabinet, he held the portfolios for Minister of Education and Minister of Agriculture and Commerce. In October 1925, Okano was appointed Vice-President of the Privy Council, and was awarded the title of baron (danshaku) in the kazoku peerage. He was also appointed President of the prestigious Imperial Academy. He died the same year.

Political offices
Preceded by Enkichi Ōki	Minister of Justice; June 1922 – September 1923	Succeeded by Den Kenjirō
Preceded by Inukai Tsuyoshi	Minister of Education; 1923	Succeeded by Egi Kazuyuki
Preceded by Den Kenjirō	Minister of Agriculture & Commerce; December 1923 – January 1924	Succeeded by Maeda Toshisada
