= Tadaharu =

- Gender: Male

Origin
- Origin: Japanese
- Meaning: Different meanings depending on the kanji used

Tadaharu (written: 忠晴, 忠春 忠治 or 忠治) is a masculine Japanese given name. Notable people with the name include:

- Tadaharu Goto (後藤 忠治; born 1941), Japanese swimmer
- Horio Tadaharu (堀尾 忠晴; 1596–1633), Japanese daimyō
- Kōryū Tadaharu (光龍 忠晴; born 1984), Japanese sumo wrestler
- Tadaharu Nakano (中野 忠晴; 1909–1970), Japanese musician
- Tadaharu Ogawa (小川 忠晴; born 1969), Japanese basketball player and coach
- Tadaharu Shimooka (下岡 忠治; 1870–1925), Japanese academic
- Torii Tadaharu (鳥居 忠春; 1624–1663), Japanese daimyō
