= Ume Kenjirō =

Japanese lawyer

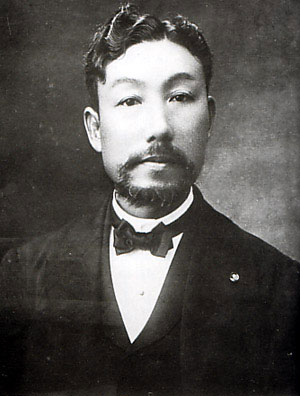
- Ume Kenjirō
- Born: June 24, 1860; Matsue, Shimane, Japan
- Died: August 26, 1910 (aged 50); Seoul, Korean Empire
- Occupations: Legal Scholar, Educator

Ume Kenjirō (梅 謙次郎; July 24, 1860 – August 26, 1910) was a legal scholar in Meiji period Japan, and a founder of Hosei University.

== Life and career ==
Ume was born the second son of the domain doctor of Matsue domain, Izumo Province (present-day Shimane Prefecture)Chūgoku region, Japan. He was sent to study French at Tokyo University of Foreign Studies, and upon graduation was employed by the Ministry of Justice. He also taught at Tokyo Imperial University. Ume was sent by the government for advanced studies to the University of Lyon in France in 1886, completing his studies in 1889. After an additional year of study at the Humboldt University of Berlin in Germany, he returned to Japan in 1890. He was awarded the degree of doctorate of law by University of Lyon in 1891.

On his return, Ume became embroiled in the Civil Code controversy, and urged the immediate adoption of the code as drawn up by French foreign advisor to the government, Gustave Emile Boissonade. When the adoption of the code was delayed in 1892, he appealed to Prime Minister Itō Hirobumi to establish a committee to prepare the new draft, and was chosen to be a member of the new committee in 1893. Together with Hozumi Nobushige and Tomii Masaaki, he is regarded as the father of Japan's civil law, which was put into effect in 1898.

In 1894, Ume was one of a group of lawyers who established the Tokyo Law School, the forerunner of present-day Hosei University, of which he served as president in 1899.

In 1906, he was asked by Itō to help codify the laws for the Japanese protectorate of Korea. He died in Keijo (Seoul) in 1910, of typhoid fever at the age of 50. He was awarded the Order of the Sacred Treasure (1st class) on his deathbed, one day before he died. His grave is at Gokoku-ji in Tokyo.

== References & further reading ==
- Hozumi, Nobushige. The new Japanese civil code,: As material for the study of comparative jurisprudence. Maruzen 1912. ASIN: B000870Z46
- Marshall Byron K. "Professors and Politics: The Meiji Academic Elite". Journal of Japanese Studies, Vol. 3, No. 1 (Winter, 1977), pp. 71–97
- Oda, Hiroshi. Japanese Law. Oxford University Press, 2001. ISBN 0199248109
