= Privy Council of Japan =

Advisors to Japanese Emperor (1888–1947)

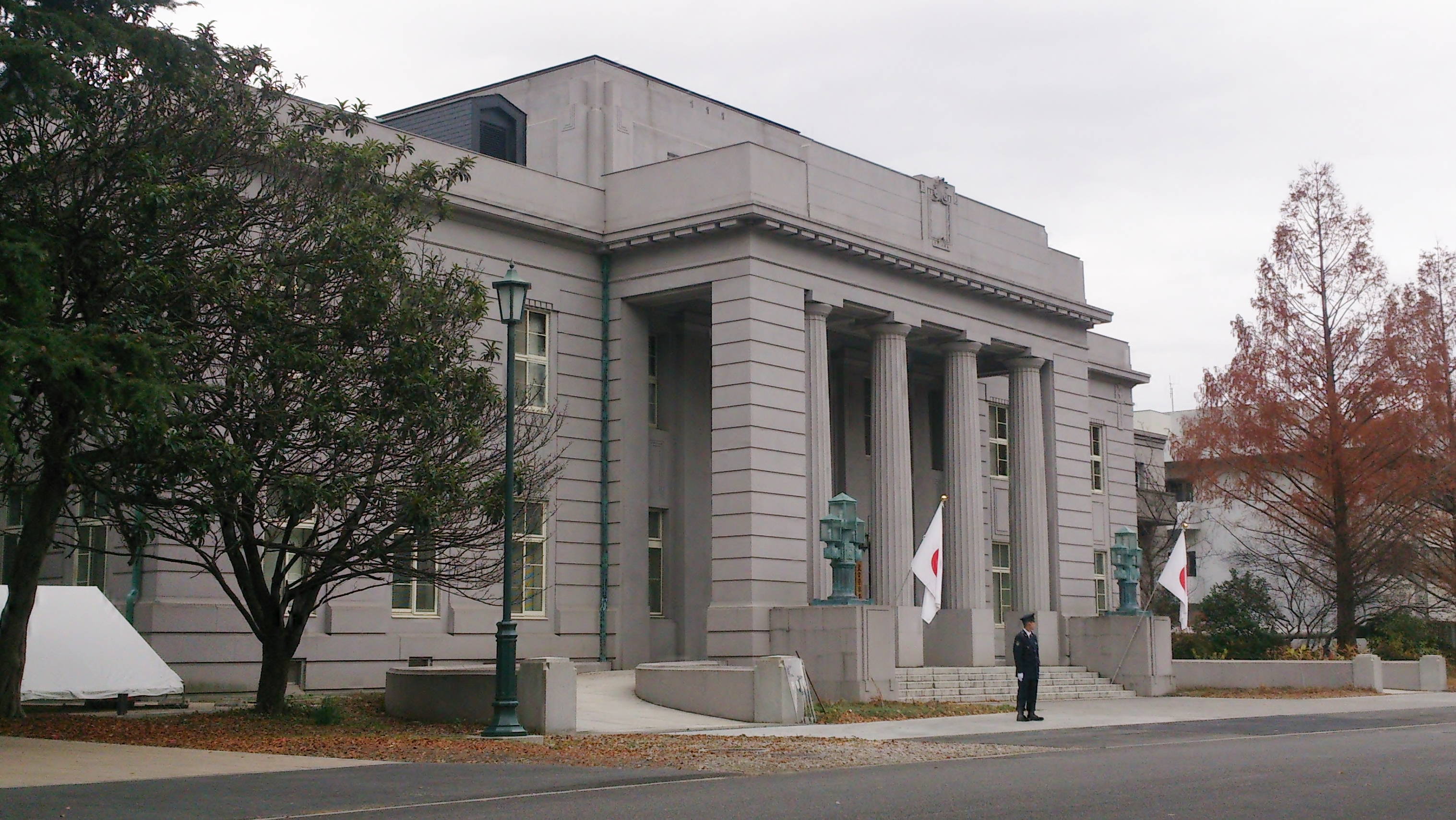
Sūmitsu-in building from 1922

The Privy Council of Japan (Japanese: 枢密院, romanized: Sūmitsu-in) was an advisory council to the Emperor of Japan that operated from 1888 to 1947. It was largely used to limit the power of the Imperial Diet.

== Functions ==
Modeled in part upon the British Privy Council, this body advised the Japanese Empire on matters including, but not limited to:

- Proposed amendments to the Constitution of the Empire of Japan
- Proposed amendments to the 1889 Imperial Household Law
- Matters of constitutional interpretation, proposed laws, and ordinances
- Proclamations of martial law or declaration of war
- Treaties and other international agreements
- Matters concerning the succession to the throne
- Declarations of a regency under the Imperial Household Law;
- Matters submitted by the Emperor directly

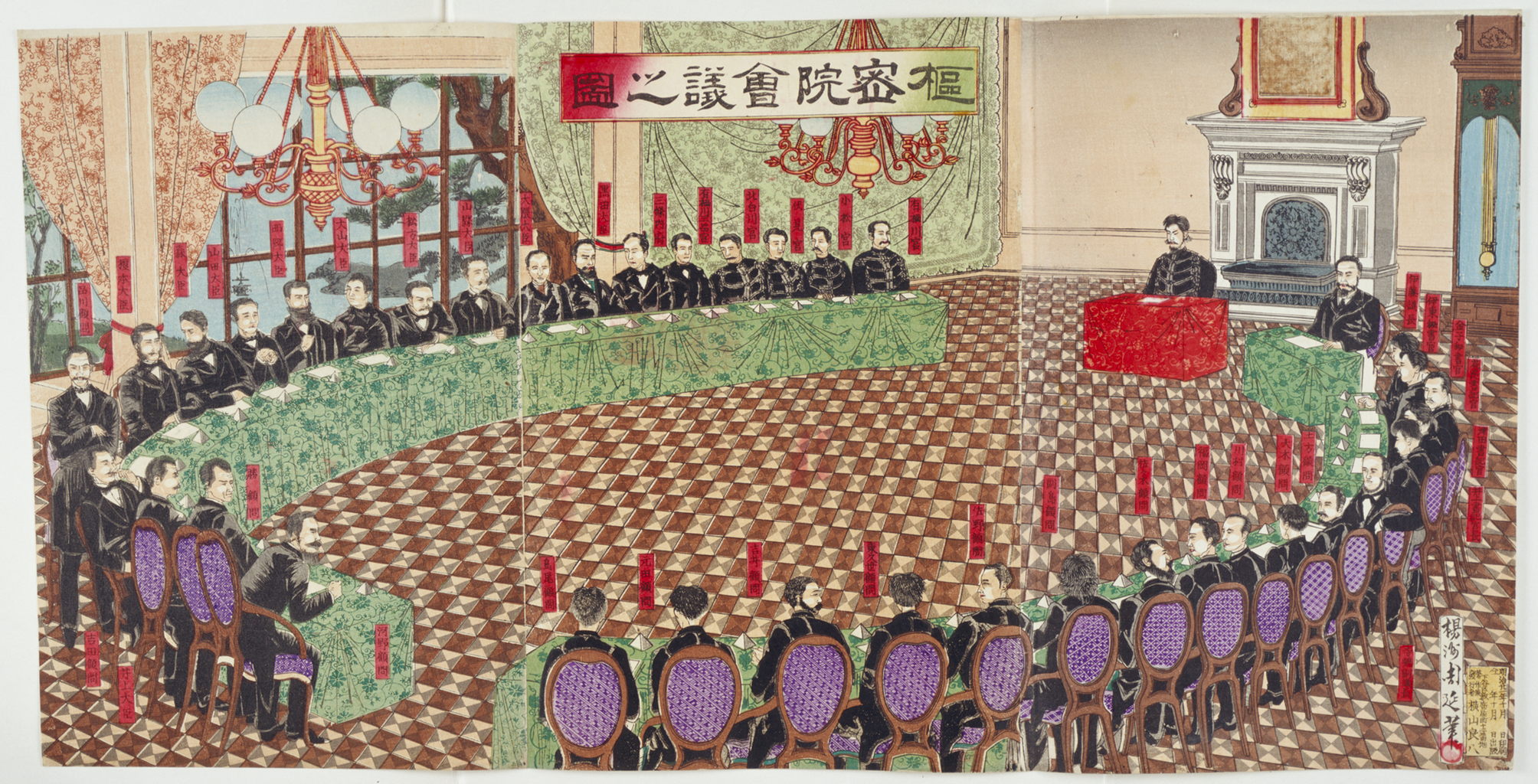
Emperor Meiji meets with his Privy Councilors. Ukiyo-e woodblock prints by Yōshū Chikanobu, 1888

The Privy Council had both judicial functions and certain executive functions. However, the council had no power to initiate legislation.

== Establishment ==
To oversee new governmental developments, in 1871, three councils were created - the Council of the Left, Centre, and Right, who would be collectively known as the Council of the Elders (genrō in). The Elders oversaw the writing of the Meiji Constitution, and would become councilors in the Privy Council.

The Privy Council of Japan was established by an imperial ordinance of Emperor Meiji dated 28 April 1888, under the presidency of Itō Hirobumi, to deliberate on the draft constitution. The new constitution, which the emperor promulgated on 11 February 1889, briefly mentioned the Privy Council in Chapter 4, Article 56: "The Privy Councilors shall, in accordance with the provisions for the organization of the Privy Council, deliberate upon important matters of State when they have been consulted by the Emperor."

The Privy Council consisted of a chairman, a vice chairman (non-voting), twelve (later expanded to twenty-four) councilors, a chief secretary, and three additional secretaries. All privy councilors including the president and the vice president were appointed by the Emperor for life, on the advice of the Prime Minister and the cabinet. In addition to the twenty-four voting privy counselors, the Prime Minister and the other ministers of state were ex officio members of the council. The princes of the imperial household (both the shinnōke and the ōke ) over the age of majority were permitted to attend meetings of the Privy Council and could participate in its proceedings. The president was the authority as he called and controlled meetings inside of the council. The Council met in secret at the Tokyo Imperial Palace, with the Emperor in attendance on important occasions. The Council was empowered to deliberate on any matters upon which the Emperor desired an opinion.

== Assessment ==
Theoretically, the Privy Council's legal power was extensive, but, like many other aspects of Meiji-era politics, the effective power of the Privy Council was largely based upon the genrō and other oligarchs. Masao Maruyama described the Council as an "irrational arrangement prevailed in which decisions depended on fortuitous human relations, psychological coercion by the Elder Statesmen [genro] and other ‘officials close to the Throne,’ shifts in the relative strength of cliques, deals among wire-pullers and bosses, assignation-house politics, and so forth."

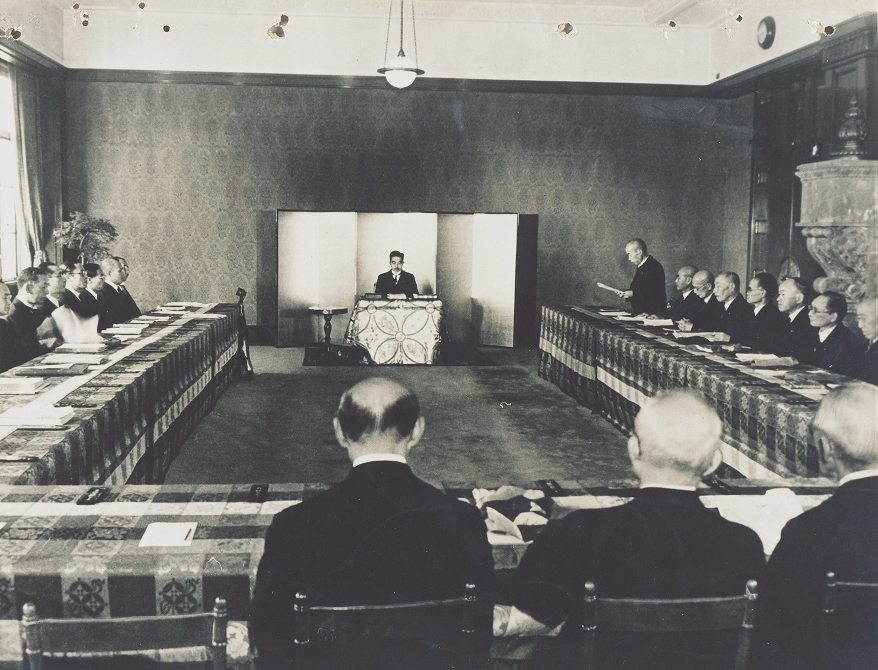
Meeting of Privy Council, 1946

During its early years, many members of the Privy Council were simultaneously members of the elected government; however in its later years, the Privy Council essentially replaced the genrō and the Genrōin as a very conservative “old boys” club, often at odds with the party-dominated elected government. After the Privy Council unsuccessfully challenged the government by attempting to reject several government decisions, and by attempting to assert itself on certain foreign policy issues, it was demonstrated that in actuality the balance of power was with the elected government. The Privy Council was thenceforth largely ignored, and was not consulted on major policy matters, including the Attack on Pearl Harbor.

The Privy Council was abolished with the enforcement of the current postwar Constitution of Japan on 3 May 1947.

== Leadership ==
=== Presidents ===
Fifteen people served as the President of the Privy Council of Japan.

Portrait	Name	Term start	Term end
	Count; Itō Hirobumi (1841–1909)	30 April 1888	30 October 1889
	Count; Ōki Takatō (1832–1899)	24 December 1889	1 June 1891
	Count; Itō Hirobumi (1841–1909)	1 June 1891	8 August 1892
	Count; Ōki Takatō (1832–1899)	8 August 1892	11 March 1893
	Count; Yamagata Aritomo (1838–1922)	11 March 1893	12 December 1893
	Count; Kuroda Kiyotaka (1840–1900)	17 March 1894	25 August 1900
	Marquis; Saionji Kinmochi (1849–1940)	27 August 1900	13 July 1903
	Marquis; Itō Hirobumi (1841–1909)	13 July 1903	21 December 1905
	Marquis; Yamagata Aritomo (1838–1922)	21 December 1905	14 June 1909
	Prince; Itō Hirobumi (1841–1909)	14 June 1909	26 October 1909
	Prince; Yamagata Aritomo (1838–1922)	26 October 1909	1 February 1922
	Viscount; Kiyoura Keigo (1850–1942)	8 February 1922	7 January 1924
	Viscount; Hamao Arata (1849–1925)	13 January 1924	25 September 1925
	Baron; Hozumi Nobushige (1855–1926)	1 October 1925	8 April 1926
	Baron; Kuratomi Yūzaburō (1853–1948)	12 April 1926	3 May 1934
	Baron; Ichiki Kitokurō (1867–1944)	3 May 1934	13 March 1936
	Baron; Kiichirō Hiranuma (1867–1952)	13 March 1936	5 January 1939
	Prince; Fumimaro Konoe (1891–1945)	5 January 1939	24 June 1940
	Hara Yoshimichi (1867–1944)	24 June 1940	7 August 1944
	Baron; Suzuki Kantarō (1868–1948)	7 August 1944	7 June 1945
	Baron; Kiichirō Hiranuma (1867–1952)	9 April 1945	3 December 1945
	Baron; Suzuki Kantarō (1868–1948)	3 December 1945	13 June 1946
	Shimizu Tōru (1868–1947)	13 June 1946	26 September 1946

=== Vice presidents ===
Portrait	Name	Term start	Term end
	Count; Terashima Munenori (1832–1893)	10 May 1888	10 September 1891
	Count; Soejima Taneomi (1828–1905)	10 September 1891	11 March 1892
	Count; Higashikuze Michitomi (1834–1912)	17 March 1892	4 January 1912
	Count; Yoshikawa Akimasa (1842–1920)	9 January 1912	20 March 1917
	Viscount; Kiyoura Keigo (1850–1942)	20 March 1917	8 February 1922
	Viscount; Hamao Arata (1849–1925)	15 February 1922	13 January 1924
	Ichiki Kitokurō (1867–1944)	14 January 1924	30 March 1925
	Baron; Hozumi Nobushige (1855–1926)	30 March 1925	1 October 1925
	Okano Keijirō (1865–1925)	1 October 1925	23 December 1925
	Baron; Kuratomi Yuzaburo (1853–1948)	28 December 1925	12 April 1926
	Baron; Kiichirō Hiranuma (1867–1952)	12 April 1926	13 March 1936
	Arai Kentarō (1867–1952)	13 March 1936	29 January 1938
	Hara Yoshimichi (1867–1944)	3 February 1938	24 June 1940
	Baron; Suzuki Kantarō (1868–1948)	24 June 1940	10 August 1944
	Shimizu Tōru (1868–1947)	10 August 1944	13 June 1946
	Shigenosuke Ushio (1881–1955)	13 June 1946	2 May 1947

== See also ==
- Lord Keeper of the Privy Seal of Japan
