= Aristaenetus =

Greek epistolographer

Aristaenetus (Greek: Ἀρισταίνετος) was a Greek epistolographer who flourished in the 5th or 6th century. Under his name, two books of love stories, in the form of letters, are extant; the subjects are borrowed from the erotic elegies of such Alexandrian writers as Callimachus, and the language is a patchwork of phrases from Plato, Lucian, Alciphron and others.

== Texts ==
- Boissonade (1822); Hercher, Epistolographi Graeci (1873).
- English translations: Abel Boyer (1701); Thomas Brown (1715); R. B. Sheridan and Nathaniel Halhed (1771 and later).
