= Third Katsura cabinet =

Japanese cabinet from 1912 to 1913

Third Katsura Cabinet
- 15th Cabinet of Japan
- 1912–1913
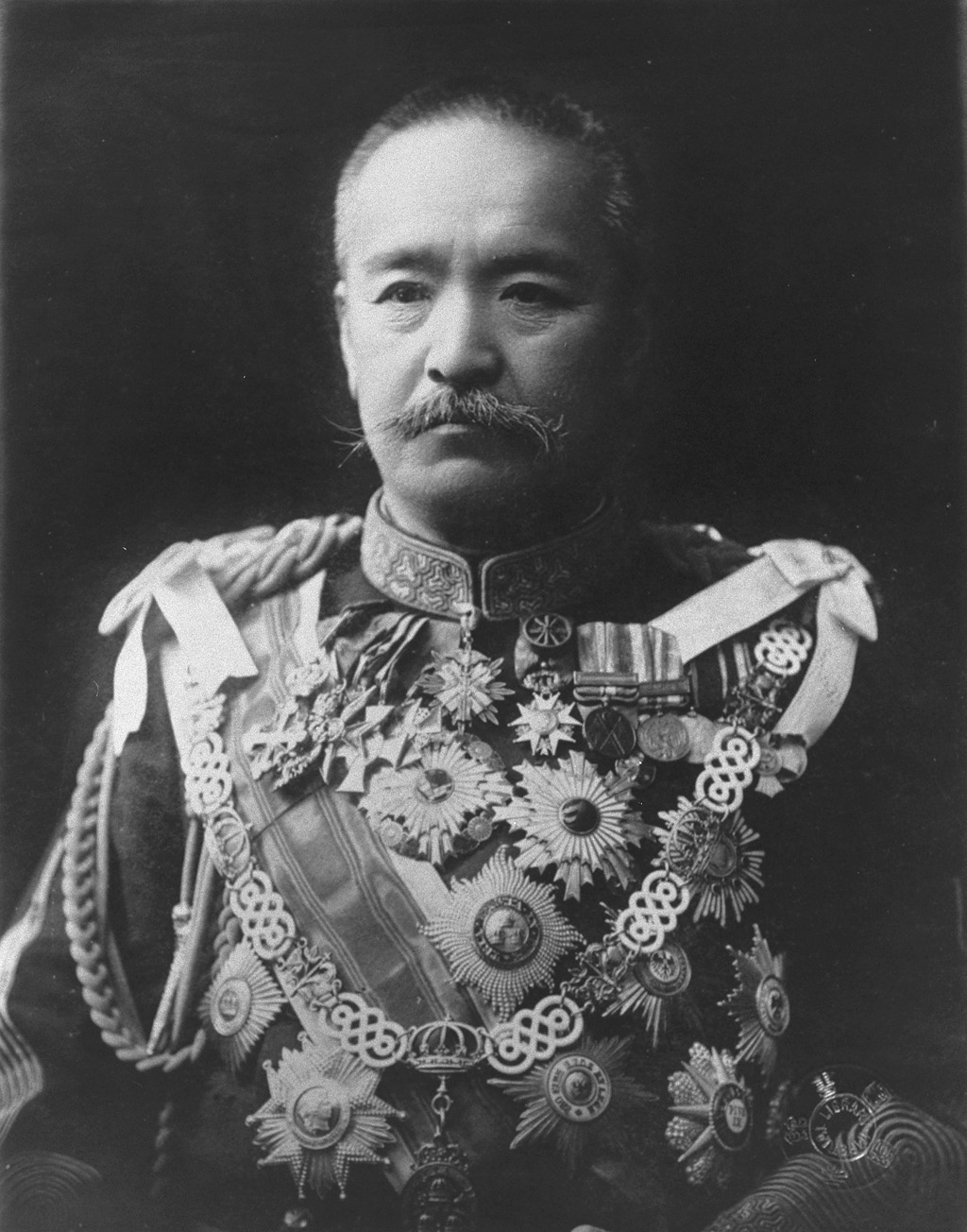
- Prime Minister Katsura Tarō
- Date formed: December 21, 1912
- Date dissolved: February 20, 1913

People and organisations
- Emperor: Taishō
- Prime Minister: Katsura Tarō
- Member party: HoP Blocs: Sawakai
- Status in legislature: Minority

History
- Legislature term: 1912–1915
- Predecessor: Second Saionji Cabinet
- Successor: First Yamamoto Cabinet

The Third Katsura Cabinet is the 15th Cabinet of Japan led by Katsura Tarō from December 21, 1912 to February 20, 1913.

== Cabinet ==
Third Katsura Cabinet
Portfolio	Minister	Political party	Term start	Term end
Prime Minister	Prince Katsura Tarō	Military (Army)	December 21, 1912	February 20, 1913
Minister for Foreign Affairs	Prince Katsura Tarō	Military (Army)	December 21, 1912	January 29, 1913
Minister for Foreign Affairs	Baron Katō Takaaki	Independent	January 29, 1913	February 20, 1913
Minister of Home Affairs	Viscount Ōura Kanetake	Sawakai	December 21, 1912	February 20, 1913
Minister of Finance	Wakatsuki Reijirō	Independent	December 21, 1912	February 20, 1913
Minister of the Army	Baron Kigoshi Yasutsuna	Military (Army)	December 21, 1912	February 20, 1913
Minister of the Navy	Baron Saitō Makoto	Military (Navy)	December 21, 1912	February 20, 1913
Minister of Justice	Matsumuro Itasu	Independent	December 21, 1912	February 20, 1913
Minister of Education	Shibata Kamon	Sawakai	December 21, 1912	February 20, 1913
Minister of Agriculture and Commerce	Nakashōji Ren	Independent	December 21, 1912	February 20, 1913
Minister of Communications	Baron Gotō Shinpei	Independent	December 21, 1912	February 20, 1913
Chief Cabinet Secretary	Egi Tasuku	Independent	December 21, 1912	February 20, 1913
Director-General of the Cabinet Legislation Bureau	Ichiki Kitokurō	Independent	December 21, 1912	February 20, 1913

Preceded by Second Saionji Cabinet	Cabinet of Japan; 1912–1913	Succeeded by First Yamamoto Cabinet
