= Shunji Miyao =

Japanese politician

- 宮尾 舜治
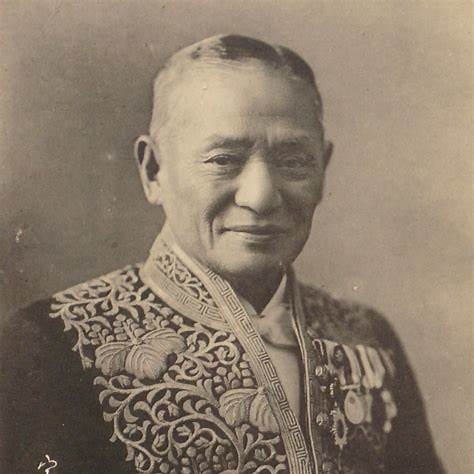

Member of the House of Peers
- In office 3 July 1934 – 3 April 1937 Nominated by the Emperor

16th Director-General of the Hokkaidō Agency
- In office 27 May 1921 – 29 September 1923
- Monarch: Taishō
- Preceded by: Shin'ichi Kasai
- Succeeded by: Kahei Toki

Governor of Aichi Prefecture
- In office 18 April 1919 – 27 May 1921
- Monarch: Taishō
- Preceded by: Shigeru Matsui
- Succeeded by: Hikoji Kawaguchi

Acting Chief of General Affairs, Government-General of Taiwan
- In office 27 July 1910 – 22 August 1910
- Governor General: Sakuma Samata
- Preceded by: Ōshima Kumaji
- Succeeded by: Uchida Kakichi

Personal details
- Born: 1 February 1868 Myōkō, Echigo, Japan
- Died: 3 April 1937 (aged 69) Meguro, Tokyo, Japan
- Education: Tokyo Imperial University

Shunji Miyao (宮尾 舜治, Miyao Shunji; 1 February 1868 – 3 April 1937) was a Japanese government official, colonial administrator, and politician.

== Early life and education ==
Shunji Miyao was born on 1 February 1868 in Niigata Prefecture, then part of Echigo Province. His father served as a village deputy headman. Miyao graduated from the Faculty of Law of the Imperial University in 1896.

== Governor and bureaucratic career ==
After graduating, Miyao entered the Ministry of Finance in 1896 and passed the higher civil service examination the same year. He later served in Taiwan under the Japanese colonial administration, including in tax and monopoly posts, before moving to the Cabinet's Colonization Bureau.

Miyao subsequently became Civil Governor of the Kwantung Leased Territory in 1917, Governor of Aichi Prefecture in 1919, and the 16th Director-General of the Hokkaidō Agency in 1921. He served as Hokkaidō Agency Director-General from 27 May 1921 to 29 September 1923.

After the 1923 Great Kantō earthquake, Miyao was appointed vice-president of the Imperial Capital Reconstruction Agency, serving under Gotō Shinpei and helping to oversee the reconstruction programme for Tokyo. Later in his career he served as president of the Tōyō Takushoku Company, was appointed to the House of Peers in 1934, and became a Tokyo city councillor in 1937.
