= Hamao Arata =

Japanese bureaucrat and politician (1849–1925)

Viscount Hamao Arata
- 濱尾 新
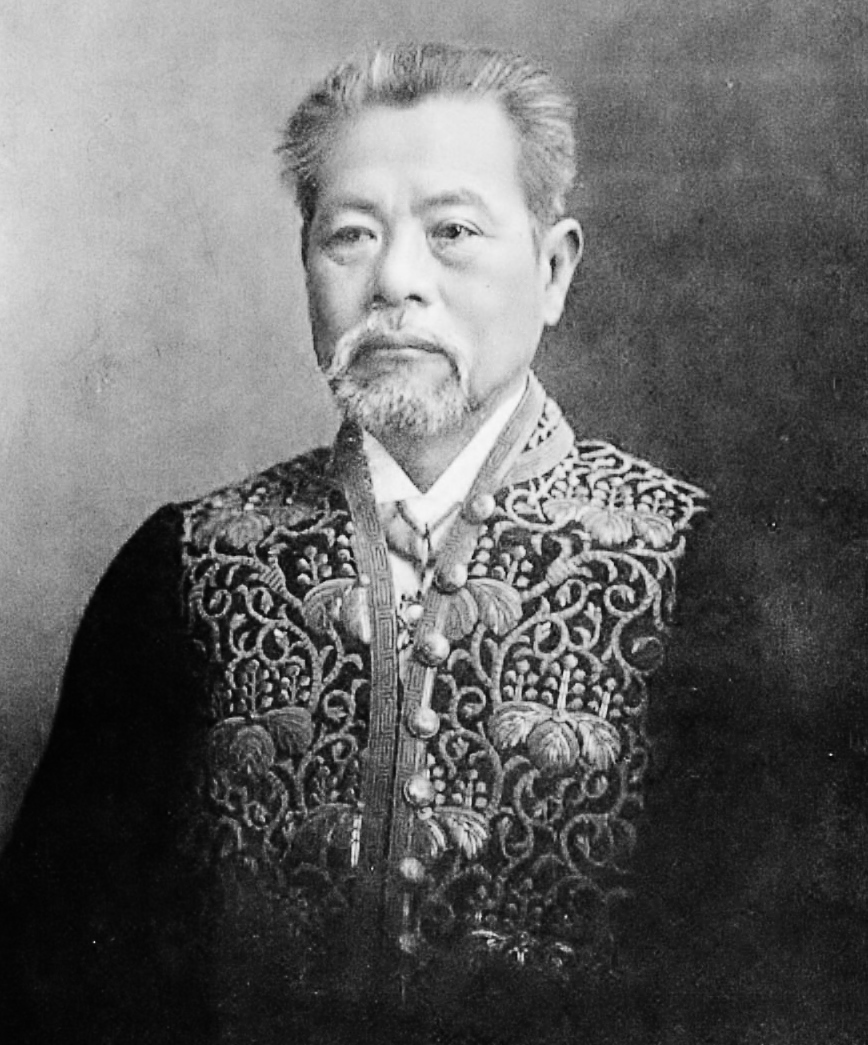

President of the Privy Council
- In office 13 January 1924 – 25 September 1925
- Monarch: Taishō
- Vice President: Ichiki Kitokurō; Hozumi Nobushige
- Preceded by: Kiyoura Keigo
- Succeeded by: Hozumi Nobushige

Vice President of the Privy Council
- In office 15 February 1922 – 13 January 1924
- Monarch: Taishō
- President: Kiyoura Keigo
- Preceded by: Kiyoura Keigo
- Succeeded by: Ichiki Kitokurō

Minister of Education
- In office 6 November 1897 – 12 January 1898
- Prime Minister: Matsukata Masayoshi
- Preceded by: Hachisuka Mochiaki
- Succeeded by: Saionji Kinmochi

Member of the Privy Council
- In office 14 August 1911 – 15 February 1922
- Monarchs: Meiji; Taishō

Member of the House of Peers
- In office 29 September 1890 – 22 August 1911 Nominated by the Emperor

Member of the Genrōin
- In office 29 December 1889 – 20 October 1890

Personal details
- Born: 12 May 1849 Toyooka, Tajima, Japan
- Died: 25 September 1925 (aged 76) Tokyo, Japan
- Education: Keio University

Viscount Hamao Arata (濱尾 新; 12 May 1849 – 25 September 1925) was a Japanese official and educator from the Meiji and Taishō periods, who served as President of the Privy Council from 1924 to 1925. He was a significant figure in the early development of the University of Tokyo.

Hamao hailed from Toyooka, Hyōgo. He was an official in the Ministry of Education and an academic administrator, serving twice as the president of Tokyo Imperial University and once as Minister of Education. He later served as a courtier, supervising the household and education of the future Emperor Hirohito.

== Biography ==
Hamao Arata was born on 12 May 1849 to a samurai family of the Toyooka Domain in Tajima Province. After the Meiji Restoration, he studied at the Keio Gijuku. He entered the Ministry of Education in 1872, before being sent to study in the United States for a year. After returning to Japan he served as a school principal.

The University of Tokyo, then simply the Imperial University, was founded in 1877, and Hamao became an assistant professor, becoming the right-hand man to its first president Katō Hiroyuki, his countryman from Tajima Province. Hamao later became chief of the Specialised Education Bureau in the Ministry of Education.

In March 1893, Hamao was appointed president of the Imperial University on Katō's recommendation. During his tenure the university changed its name to Tokyo Imperial University due to the foundation of Kyoto Imperial University in 1897. In November of the same year Hamao was appointed Minister of Education in the Second Matsukata Cabinet, serving until the cabinet resigned in January 1898. He was reappointed president of Tokyo Imperial University in 1905. He was ennobled as a baron on 23 September 1907 and appointed to the privy council in 1911. In 1912, he stepped down as university president.

In 1914, he was appointed Grand Master of Crown Prince's Household (東宮大夫, Togu no Daibu). As such he supervised the education of the young Crown Prince Hirohito, concurrently serving as vice president of the palace school established especially for his education, with the revered Admiral Tōgō Heihachirō as president. Hamao opposed the plan to have the Crown Prince undertake a European tour. Hamao was removed from his position in November 1921. At the same time he was elevated to viscount in the nobility.

Hamao became vice president of the Privy Council in 1922 and was promoted to president two years later. Hamao exercised the functions of Lord Keeper of the Privy Seal of Japan after the resignation of Hirata Tosuke, before Makino Nobuaki was appointed on the same day. He died on 25 September 1925

== Family ==
- Viscount Shirō Hamao (1896–1935) - A novelist and lawyer. Born Shirō Katō, the grandson of Arata's benefactor Hiroyuki Katō, he later became an adopted son of Arata, and succeeded to the viscountcy.
- Minoru Hamao (1925–2006) - The second son of Shirō, and an instructor and the Chamberlain of Crown Prince Akihito (later the 125th Emperor of Japan).
- Stephen Fumio Hamao (1930–2007) - The third son of Shirō, and a Catholic cardinal.

Preceded by Kiyoura Keigo	President of the Privy Council; 1924–1925	Succeeded by Hozumi Nobushige
Preceded by Kiyoura Keigo	Vice President of the Privy Council; 1922–1924	Succeeded by Ichiki Kitokurō
Preceded by Hatano Norinao	Grand Master of the Crown Prince's Household; 1914–1921	Succeeded by Chinda Sutemi
Preceded by Matsui Naokichi	President of University of Tokyo; December 1905 – August 1912	Succeeded by Yamakawa Kenjirō
Preceded by Hachisuka Mochiaki	Minister of Education; 1897–1898	Succeeded by Saionji Kinmochi
Preceded by Katō Hiroyuki	President of University of Tokyo; March 1893 – November 1897	Succeeded by Toyama Masakazu
