= Shin'ichi Kasai =

Japanese politician

- 笠井 信一
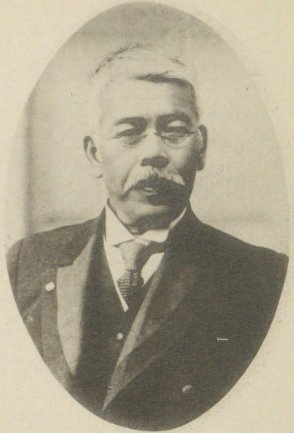

Member of the House of Peers
- In office 25 May 1921 – 25 July 1929 Nominated by the Emperor
Gubernatorial offices
15th Director-General of the Hokkaidō Agency
In office 18 April 1919 – 27 May 1921
Monarch	Taishō
Preceded by	Magoichi Tawara
Succeeded by	Shunji Miyao
Governor of Okayama Prefecture
In office 9 June 1914 – 18 April 1919
Monarch	Taishō
Preceded by	Kurahei Yuasa
Succeeded by	Hikaru Kagawa
Governor of Shizuoka Prefecture
In office 3 March 1913 – 9 June 1914
Monarch	Taishō
Preceded by	Shigeru Matsui
Succeeded by	Kurahei Yuasa
Governor of Iwate Prefecture
In office 12 January 1907 – 3 March 1913
Monarchs	Meiji; Taishō
Preceded by	Norikichi Oshikawa
Succeeded by	Sadajirō Tsutsumi

Personal details
- Born: 22 July 1864 Fuji, Suruga, Japan
- Died: 25 July 1929 (aged 65) Tokyo, Japan
- Education: Tokyo Imperial University

Shin'ichi Kasai (笠井 信一, Kasai Shin'ichi; 22 July 1864 – 25 July 1929) was a Japanese bureaucrat in the Home Ministry and politician who served as governor of Iwate Prefecture (from 1907 to 1913), Shizuoka Prefecture (1913–1914), and Okayama Prefecture (1914–1919), before becoming Director-General of the Hokkaidō Agency from April 1919 to May 1921. He was then appointed to the House of Peers.

== Early life and education ==
Shin'ichi Kasai was born on 19 June 1864 in Fuji District, Suruga Province (now in Shizuoka Prefecture), the third son of Kasai Kanzaburō. Biographical dictionaries describe him as a native of Suruga and state that he graduated from the Faculty of Law of Tokyo Imperial University in 1892.

== Bureaucratic and gubernatorial career ==
After graduating, Kasai entered the Home Ministry bureaucracy. He was appointed an official of the Taiwan Governor-General's Office on 7 February 1900 and became secretary of Tainan Prefecture on 2 April 1900.

Kasai was later appointed governor of Iwate Prefecture in 1907, and subsequently served as governor of Shizuoka and Okayama. During his five-year tenure as governor of Okayama from 1914 to 1919, he established the Saisei komon (済世顧問) system in 1917 after Emperor Taishō asked at a conference of local governors about the condition of poor people in the prefecture; the system is regarded as the origin of Japan's later minsei-in welfare commissioner system.

He then served as the 15th Director-General of the Hokkaidō Agency from 18 April 1919 to 27 May 1921. Later in his career he became a member of the House of Peers by imperial appointment.
