= Gustave Boissonade =

French legal scholar

Gustave Émile Boissonade
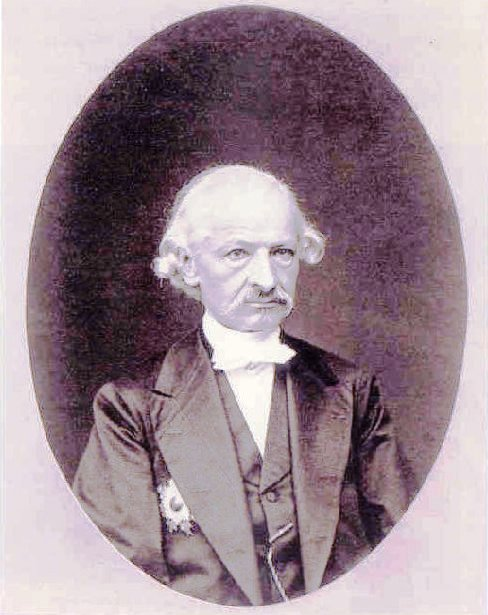
- Gustave Emile Boissonade
- Born: 7 June 1825; Vincennes, France
- Died: 27 June 1910 (aged 85); Antibes, France
- Occupations: legal scholar, educator

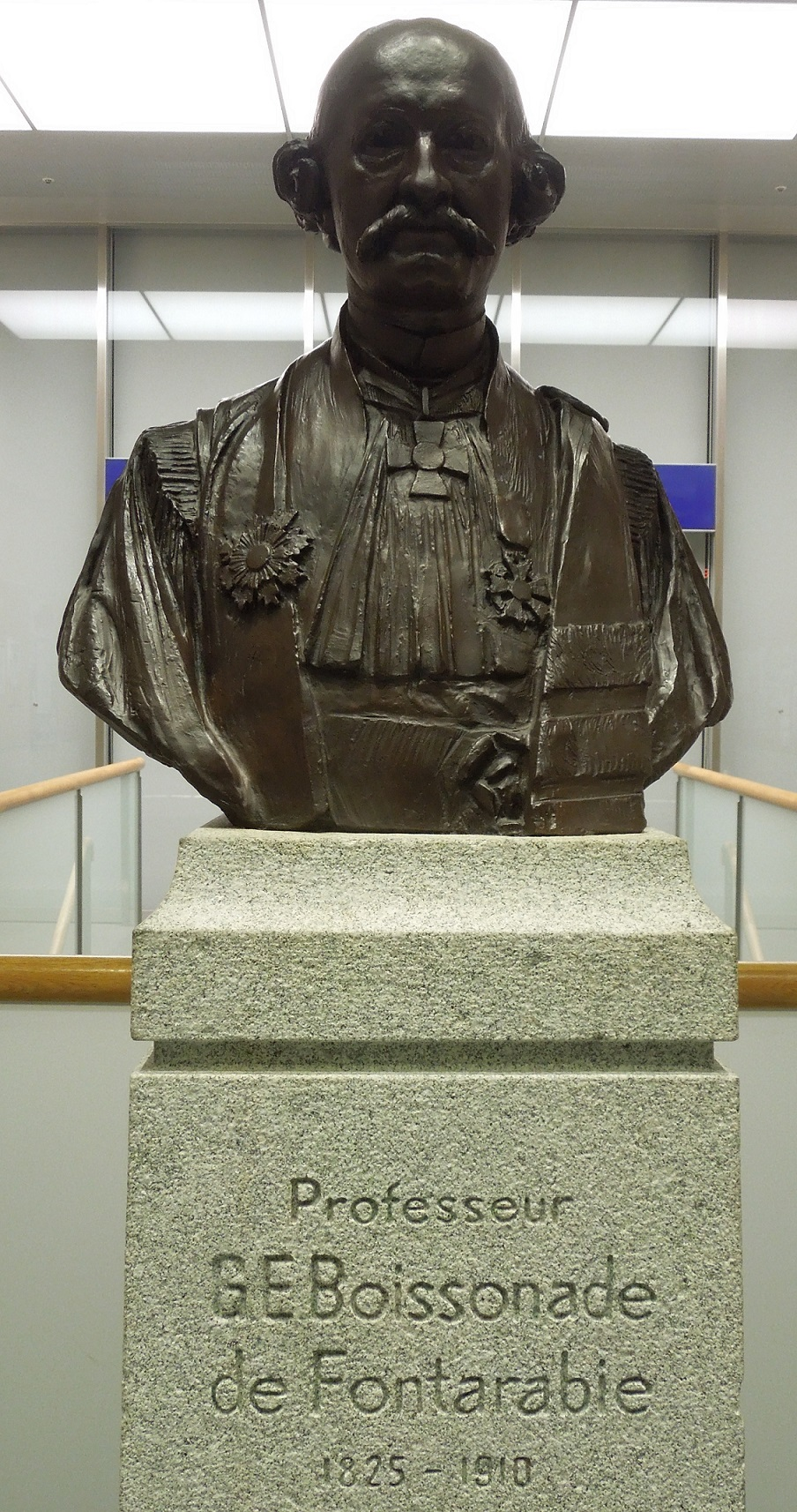
Bust of Boissonade on the campus of Hosei University

Gustave Émile Boissonade de Fontarabie (7 June 1825 – 27 June 1910) was a French legal scholar, responsible for drafting Japan's penal code during the Meiji era, and honored as one of the founders of modern Japan's legal system.

== Biography ==
Boissonade was born in Vincennes in 1825 to the famous scholar Jean François Boissonade de Fontarabie. He was a brilliant law student, and received his doctorate of law with honours from the University of Paris in 1853. He was in charge of law courses at Paris University until 1864, and was assistant law professor at the University of Grenoble until 1867.

In 1873 he was invited to lecture on constitutional and criminal law to some Japanese visitors to Paris, and received an invitation to work in Japan by the Japanese Ministry of Justice as one of several foreign legal scholars needed to assist with the drafting of Japan's legal codes and in the renegotiation of the unequal treaties.

Boissonade remained in Japan for more than 21 years, from 1873 to 1895, and worked as an instructor in the Law School of the Ministry of Justice. He worked closely with Ume Kenjirō and Hozumi Nobushige in drafting much of Japan's criminal and civil law. He was also an expert in international law, and was legal advisor to the government in the Taiwan Expedition of 1874. He was named a consultant to the Genrōin in 1875.

He also opposed Inoue Kaoru's 1887 proposal to allow non-Japanese judges, and cautioned against too rapid movement towards revision of the unequal treaties.

He was awarded the Order of the Rising Sun (2nd degree) in 1876 and was thus one of the few foreigners so honored at that time. Today, he is honored as one of the founders of Hosei University. The "Boissonade Tower", the Ichigaya campus of Hosei University halfway between Ichigaya and Iidabashi stations in central Tokyo, a 26-story building completed in 2000, was named after him.

He returned to France in 1895 and lived in Antibes, where his tomb is located.

== See also ==
- Franco-Japanese relations
