= Yuasa Kurahei =

Japanese politician (1874–1940)

Senior Second Rank Baron Yuasa Kurahei
- 湯浅 倉平

Lord Keeper of the Privy Seal
- In office 6 March 1936 – 1 June 1940
- Monarch: Hirohito
- Preceded by: Ichiki Kitokurō
- Succeeded by: Kido Kōichi

Minister of the Imperial Household
- In office 14 February 1933 – 6 March 1936
- Monarch: Hirohito
- Preceded by: Ichiki Kitokurō
- Succeeded by: Tsuneo Matsudaira

President of the Board of Audit
- In office 22 November 1929 – 15 February 1933
- Preceded by: Mizumachi Kesaroku
- Succeeded by: Hideo Kōno

Member of the House of Peers
- In office 5 October 1916 – 22 November 1929 Nominated by the Emperor
Additional positions
Inspector-General of Korea
In office 22 November 1925 – 23 December 1927
Governors-General	Saitō Makoto; Kazushige Ugaki; Yamanashi Hanzō
Preceded by	Shimooka Chūji
Succeeded by	Shirou Ikegami
Superintendent General of the Tokyo Metropolitan Police Department
In office 5 September 1923 – 7 January 1924
Preceded by	Akaike Atsushi
Succeeded by	Akaike Atsushi
Governor of Shizuoka Prefecture
In office 9 June 1914 – 12 August 1915
Monarch	Taishō
Preceded by	Shin'ichi Kasai
Succeeded by	Yasukouchi Asakichi
Governor of Okayama Prefecture
In office 1 June 1913 – 9 June 1914
Monarch	Taishō
Preceded by	Tsunamasa Ōyama
Succeeded by	Shin'ichi Kasai

Personal details
- Born: 1 February 1874 Uka, Yamaguchi, Japan
- Died: 24 December 1940 (aged 66) Ushigome, Tokyo, Japan
- Party: Dōseikai
- Children: 1
- Education: Tokyo Imperial University

Baron Yuasa Kurahei (湯浅 倉平; 1 February 1874 – 24 December 1940) was a Japanese politician and bureaucrat. He served as Lord Keeper of the Privy Seal of Japan (1936–1940), Minister of the Imperial Household (1933–1936), Inspector-General of Korea (1925–1927) and President of the Board of Audit (1929–1933). He was a member of the House of Peers from 1916 to 1929. He held the court rank of Senior Second Rank.

== Early life and family ==
Ishikawa Kurahei was born on 1 February 1874, in Uka, Toyoura, Yamaguchi Prefecture (present-day Shimonoseki, Yamaguchi Prefecture), the second son of doctor Ishikawa Kōan and his wife Ichi. The Ishikawa family had been doctors and prominent village headmen of Uka for generations; Ishikawa's eldest daughter Tomoko had married Prime Minister Yamagata Aritomo in 1867, and the family was later involved in the management of Mitsui Bank and served as mayor of Shimonoseki. Kurahei's family moved to Kōriyama, Fukushima Prefecture after his elder brother Tamenoshin opened a hospital there. In 1884, his name was changed to Yuasa Kurahei after his father was adopted by shizoku Yuasa Hisatsuchi of Fukushima Prefecture.

His higher education was financed by his brother Tamenoshin. He studied politics at Tokyo Imperial University, graduating in July 1898.

== Career ==
He entered the Home Ministry on 15 July 1898, immediately after graduation.

After serving as Governor of Yamaguchi Prefecture in 1913 and Governor of Shizuoka Prefecture in 1914, he was appointed Head of Home Ministry Police Affairs Bureau in 1915 through a recommendation by Minister of Home Affairs Ichiki Kitokurō, a university era friend.

Yuasa was elected a member of the House of Peers on 5 October 1916, and served until 22 October 1929.

On 5 September 1923, after the Great Kantō earthquake, he was appointed Superintendent General of the Japanese Police and was in charge of the safety and aiding the disaster victims in the aftermath of the earthquake.

Yuasa was appointed Vice-Minister of Home Affairs under the Katō Cabinet in June 1924.

On 3 December 1925, he was appointed the 5th Inspector-General of Korea, serving until December 1927 in Keijō, Keiki-dō, Korea, Empire of Japan (present-day Seoul, South Korea).

Yuasa was appointed Minister of the Imperial Household on 15 February 1933. The appointment was unprecedented as Yuasa had not been Minister of State, and Ichiki Kitokurō and former Governor-General of Chōsen Saitō Makoto are believed to have played a role in the appointment.

When the February 26 incident occurred, without delay, Yuasa visited the Imperial Palace and played a central role in the aftermath processing of the incident. He succeeded as Lord Keeper of the Privy Seal of Japan on 6 March 1936, after Saitō Makoto was assassinated during the incident.

On 1 June 1940, Yuasa was forced to resign as Lord Keeper of the Privy Seal of Japan due to his deteriorating health. Upon resigning, he received the court rank of Senior Second Rank and zenkan reigū (the privileges of one's former post). He received First Class Order of the Rising Sun with Paulownia Flowers on 7 June 1940.

Yuasa died from pulmonary emphysema on 24 December 1940, in Ushigome, Tokyo, aged 66. Right before his death, on the same day, he conferred the title of baron. However, the barony became extinct upon his death as the heir presumptive was a female household head, his wife. He was buried at Zendō-ji temple in Kōriyama, Fukushima Prefecture.

== Family ==
Yuasa's eldest daughter married diplomat and Governor-General of Chōsen bureaucrat Tsutomu Suwa.

His nephew Daitarō Yuasa was Director of Jusendō Hospital and helped establish the Kōriyama City Library.

== Gallery ==
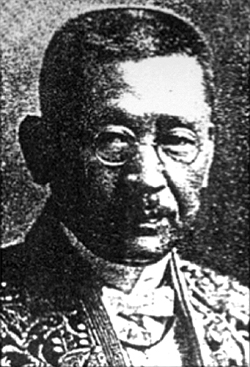
Yuasa as Inspector-General of Korea

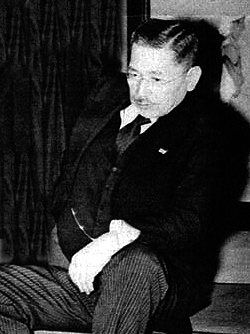
Yuasa in May 1937
