= First Saionji cabinet =

Japanese cabinet from 1906 to 1908

First Saionji Cabinet
- 12th Cabinet of Japan
- 1906–1908
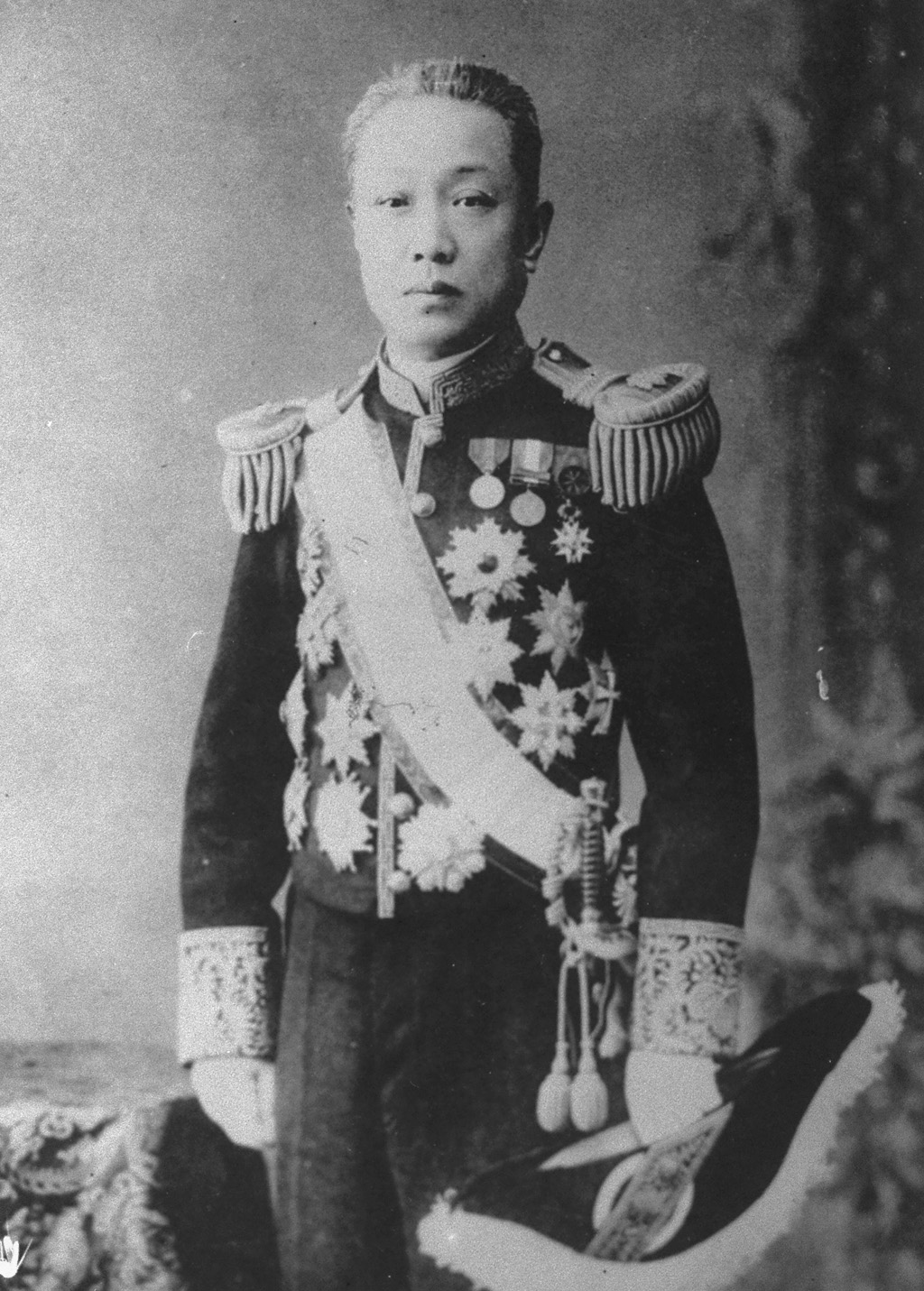
- Prime Minister Saionji Kinmochi
- Date formed: January 7, 1906
- Date dissolved: July 14, 1908

People and organisations
- Emperor: Meiji
- Prime Minister: Saionji Kinmochi
- Member party: Rikken Seiyūkai; Independent

History
- Election: 1908 general election
- Legislature terms: 1904–1908; 1908–1912
- Predecessor: First Katsura Cabinet
- Successor: Second Katsura Cabinet

The First Saionji Cabinet is the 12th Cabinet of Japan led by Saionji Kinmochi from January 7, 1906, to July 14, 1908.

== Cabinet ==
First Saionji Cabinet
Portfolio	Minister	Political party	Term start	Term end
Prime Minister	Marquess Saionji Kinmochi	Rikken Seiyūkai	January 7, 1906	July 14, 1908
Minister for Foreign Affairs	Katō Takaaki	Independent	January 7, 1906	March 3, 1906
Minister for Foreign Affairs	Marquess Saionji Kinmochi (acting)	Rikken Seiyūkai	March 3, 1906	May 19, 1906
Minister for Foreign Affairs	Viscount Hayashi Tadasu	Independent	May 19, 1906	July 14, 1908
Minister of Home Affairs	Hara Takashi	Rikken Seiyūkai	January 7, 1906	July 14, 1908
Minister of Finance	Sakatani Yoshio	Independent	January 7, 1906	January 14, 1908
Minister of Finance	Matsuda Masahisa	Rikken Seiyūkai	January 14, 1908	July 14, 1908
Minister of the Army	Terauchi Masatake	Military (Army)	January 7, 1906	July 14, 1908
Minister of the Navy	Baron Saitō Makoto	Military (Navy)	January 7, 1906	July 14, 1908
Minister of Justice	Matsuda Masahisa	Rikken Seiyūkai	January 7, 1906	March 25, 1908
Minister of Justice	Baron Senge Takatomi	Mokuyōkai	March 25, 1908	July 14, 1908
Minister of Education	Marquess Saionji Kinmochi (acting)	Rikken Seiyūkai	June 2, 1901	March 27, 1906
Minister of Education	Baron Makino Nobuaki	Independent	March 27, 1906	July 14, 1908
Minister of Agriculture and Commerce	Matsuoka Yasutake	Independent	January 7, 1906	July 14, 1908
Minister of Communications	Yamagata Isaburō	Independent	January 7, 1906	January 14, 1908
Minister of Communications	Hara Takashi	Rikken Seiyūkai	January 14, 1908	March 25, 1908
Minister of Communications	Viscount Hotta Masayasu	Kenkyūkai	March 25, 1908	July 14, 1908
Chief Cabinet Secretary	Ishiwatari Bin’ichi	Independent	January 7, 1906	January 4, 1908
Chief Cabinet Secretary	Minami Hiroshi	Independent	January 4, 1908	July 14, 1908
Director-General of the Cabinet Legislation Bureau	Ichiki Kitokurō	Independent	January 7, 1906	January 13, 1906
Director-General of the Cabinet Legislation Bureau	Okano Keijirō	Independent	January 13, 1906	July 14, 1908

Preceded by First Katsura Cabinet	Cabinet of Japan; 1906–1908	Succeeded by Second Katsura Cabinet
