= Chūichi Ariyoshi =

Japanese politician (1873–1947)

Senior Third Rank Chūichi Ariyoshi
- 有吉 忠一
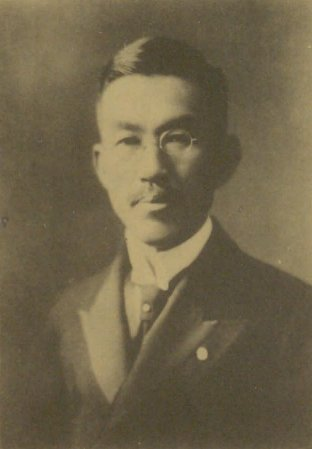

Member of the House of Peers
- In office 11 April 1930 – 15 June 1946 Nominated by the Emperor

Mayor of Yokohama
- In office 7 May 1925 – 26 February 1931
- Preceded by: Katsusaburō Watanabe
- Succeeded by: Ichirō Ōnishi
Gubernatorial offices
Governor of Hyōgo Prefecture
In office 18 April 1919 – 16 June 1922
| Monarch | Taishō |
| Preceded by | Seino Chōtarō |
| Succeeded by | Miichiro Orihara |
Governor of Kanagawa Prefecture
In office 12 August 1915 – 18 April 1919
| Monarch | Taishō |
| Preceded by | Kenzō Ishihara |
| Succeeded by | Kosai Inoue |
Governor of Miyazaki Prefecture
In office 13 March 1911 – 12 August 1915
| Monarchs | Meiji; Taishō |
| Preceded by | Takaoka Tadayoshi |
| Succeeded by | Hidetarō Horiuchi |
Governor of Chiba Prefecture
In office 28 March 1908 – 14 June 1910
| Monarch | Meiji |
| Preceded by | Kenzō Ishihara |
| Succeeded by | Kotsumori Ryō |

Personal details
- Born: 2 June 1873 Miyazu, Kyoto, Japan
- Died: 10 February 1947 (aged 73)
- Relatives: Iwao Yamazaki (son-in-law)
- Education: Faculty of Law, Tokyo Imperial University

Chūichi Ariyoshi (有吉 忠一, Ariyoshi Chūichi; 2 June 1873 – 10 February 1947) was a Japanese bureaucrat and politician. He was born in Miyazu, Kyoto Prefecture. He was the first president of Keijō Imperial University in Seoul, Korea, from May to July 1924 during the period when Korea was under Japanese rule. He served as governor of Chiba, Miyazaki, Kanagawa, Hyogo. He was mayor of Yokohama from 1925 to 1931.

== Career ==
He was born on 2 June 1873 into a Samurai family in Kyoto. He graduated from the Tokyo Imperial University in 1896 with a degree in English Law, and started working for the Home Ministry. After spending some time in Europe, he served as governor of four prefectures: Chiba, Miyazaki, Kanagawa, and Hyogo. He held senior roles in the Government-General of Chōsen. During his six-year tenure as Mayor of Yokohama, he played a central role in rebuilding and reorganising the earthquake-struck city, including the decision to build Yamashita Park.

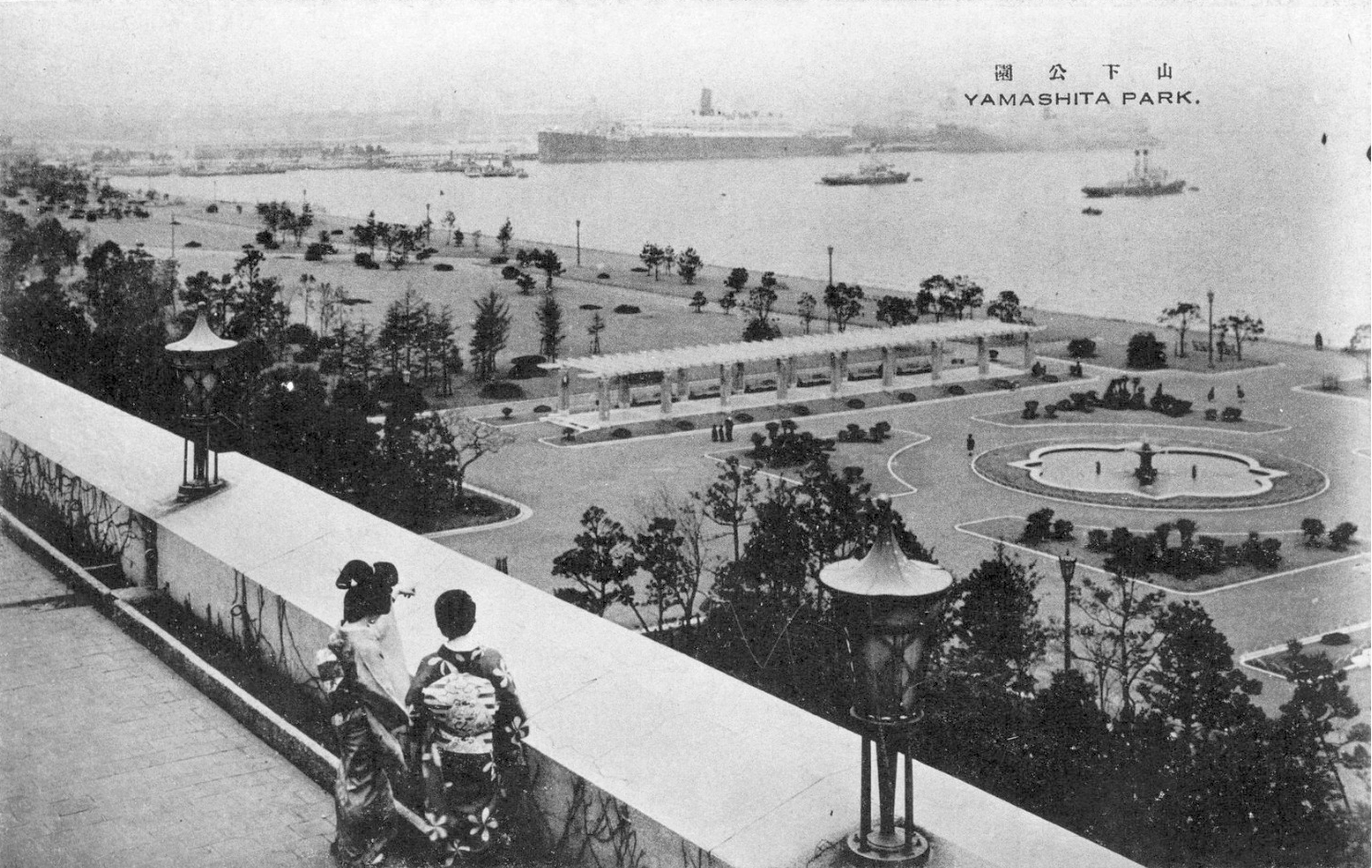
Yamashita Park, a central piece in Ariyoshi's Yokohama reconstruction plan

Emplem of Hyogo Prefecture, conceived by Ariyoshi

== Honours ==
=== Court Ranks ===
- Senior Fourth Rank (正四位)
- Junior Third Rank (従三位)
- Senior Third Rank (正三位)

=== Orders ===
- The Order of the Rising Sun, Gold and Silver Star (2nd class)

== Family ==
Source: Parents:

- Sanshichi
- Uta

Spouse:

- Hisae (有吉久榮)

Siblings:

- Akira (有吉明): Diplomat, served as ambassador to Switzerland, Brazil, and China
- Minoru (有吉実): Senior bureaucrat, lawyer

Children:

- Yoshiya (有吉義弥): Chief Executive of NYK Line (1965–1971)
- Fumiko (有吉文子): Married Iwao Yamazaki
- Tokuko (有吉德子): Married Shigeru Yonezawa (米沢滋), president of NTT (1965–1977)

== See also ==
- Keijō Imperial University
- Shimooka Chūji
