= Jean François Boissonade de Fontarabie =

French scholar (1774–1857)

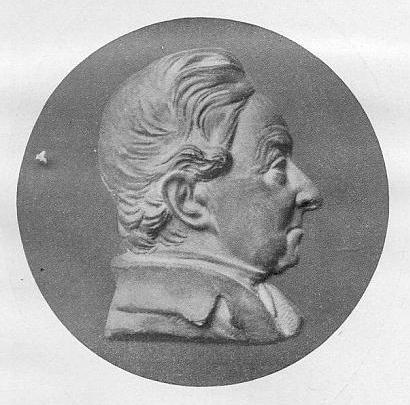
Jean François Boissonade de Fontarabie.

Jean François Boissonade de Fontarabie (12 August 1774 – 8 September 1857) was a French classical scholar.

== Life ==
He was born in Paris. In 1792 he entered the public service during the administration of General Dumouriez. Driven out in 1795, he was restored by Lucien Bonaparte, during whose time of office he served as secretary to the prefecture of the Upper Marne. He then resigned public employment permanently, in order to devote his time to the study of Greek. In 1809 he was appointed deputy professor of Greek at the faculty of letters at Paris, and titular professor in 1813 on the death of Pierre Henri Larcher. In 1828 he succeeded Jean-Baptiste Gail in the chair of Greek at the Collège de France. He also held the offices of librarian of the Bibliothèque du Roi, and perpetual secretary of the Académie des Inscriptions. Boissonade was the father of Gustave Emile Boissonade.

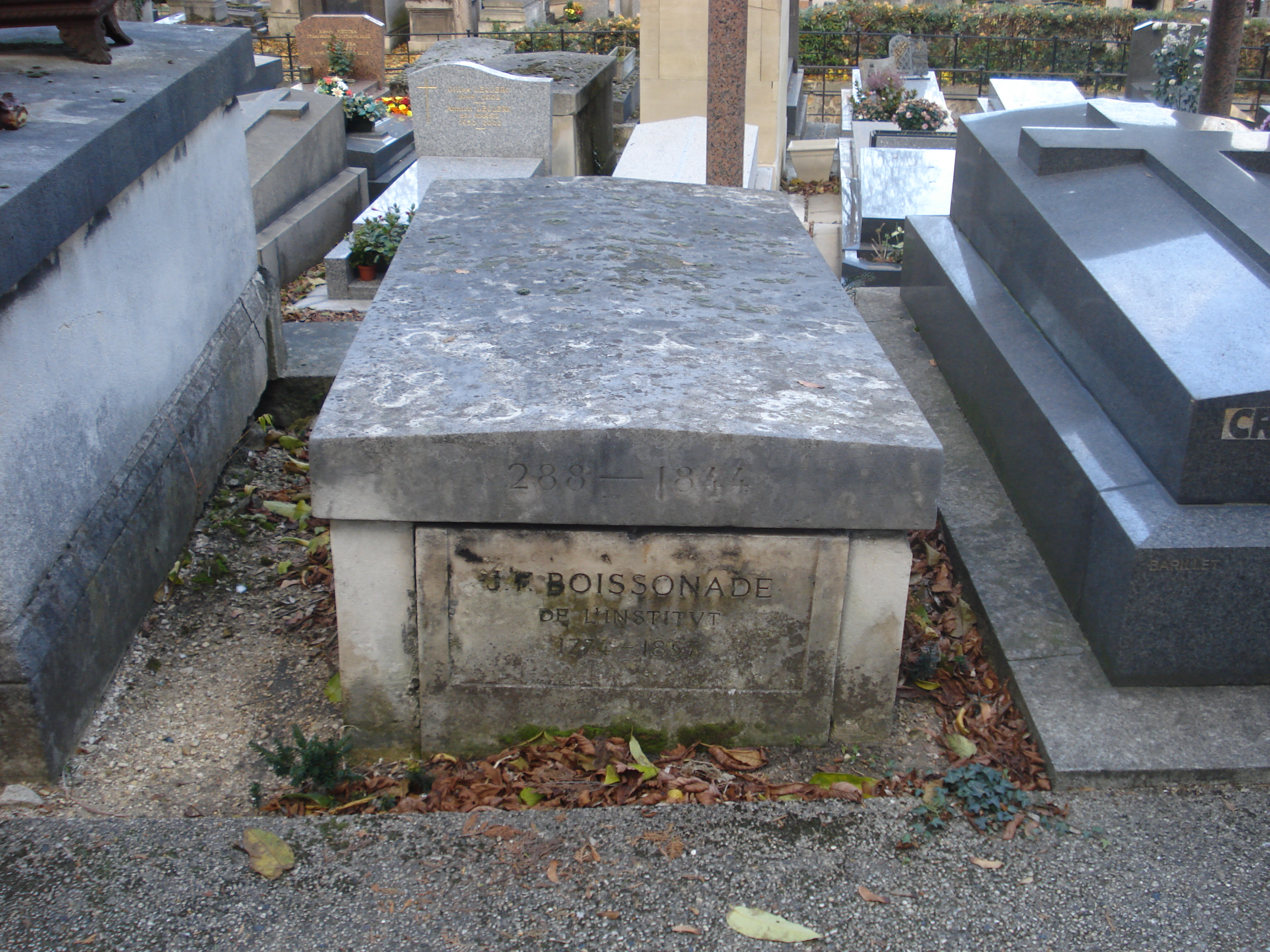
Boisonnade's grave at Montmartre Cemetery.

== Works ==
Boissonade chiefly devoted his attention to later Greek literature:

- Philostratus, Heroica (1806) and Epistolae (1842)
- Marinus, Vita procli (1814)
- Tiberius Rhetor, De Figuris (1815)
- Nicetas Eugenianus, Drosilla et Charicles (1819)
- Herodian, Partitiones (1819)
- Aristaenetus, Epistolae (1822)
- Eunapius, Vitae Sophistarum (1822)
- Babrius, Fables (1844)
- Tzetzes, Allegoriae Iliadis (1851)
- a Collection of Greek Poets in 24 vols.

The Anecdota Graeca (1829–1833) and Anecdota Nova (1844) are important for Byzantine history and the Greek grammarians.

A selection of his papers was published by Ferdinand Colincamp, Critique littéraire sous le premier Empire (1863), vol. i of which contains a complete list of his works, and a "Notice Historique sur Monsieur B." by Joseph Naudet.
