= Second Saionji cabinet =

Japanese cabinet from 1911 to 1912

Second Saionji Cabinet
- 14th Cabinet of Japan
- 1911–1912
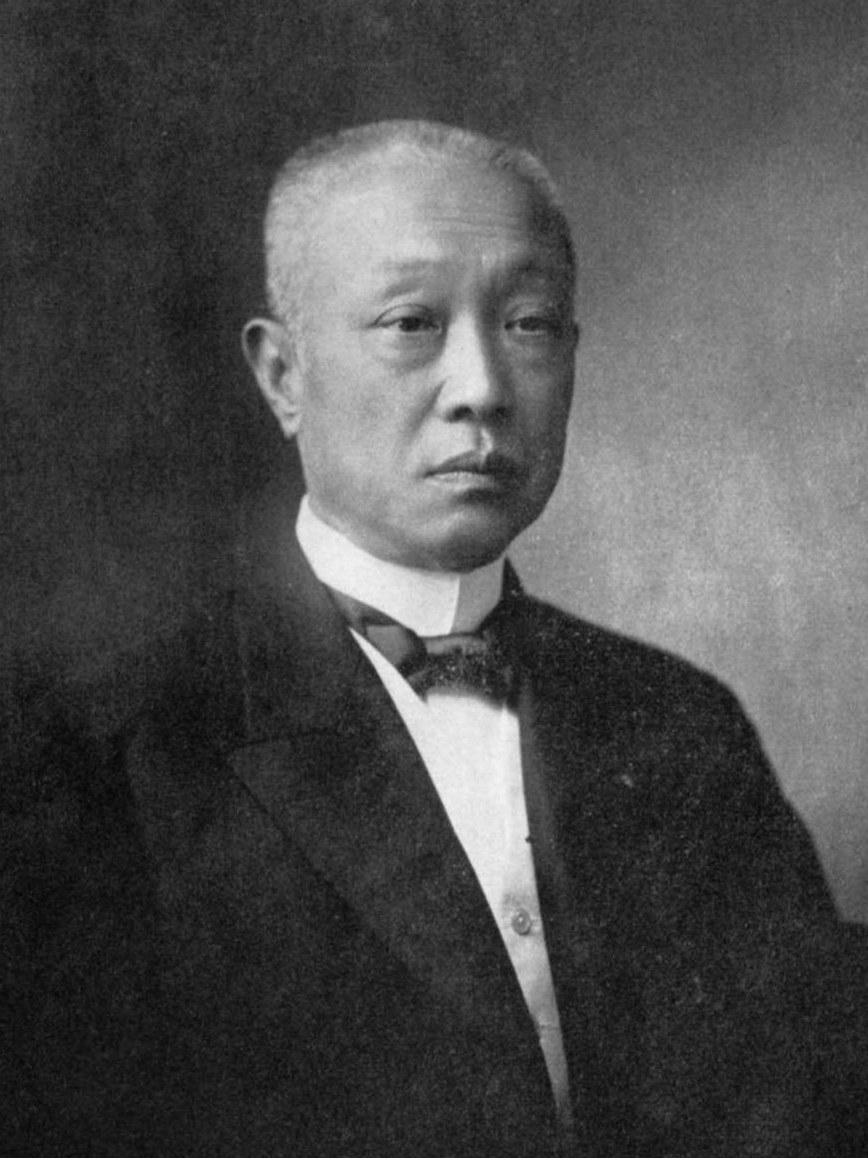
- Prime Minister Saionji Kinmochi
- Date formed: August 30, 1911
- Date dissolved: December 21, 1912

People and organisations
- Emperor: Meiji (1911–Jul 1912); Taishō (Jul–Dec 1912)
- Prime Minister: Saionji Kinmochi
- Member party: Rikken Seiyūkai

History
- Election: 1912 general election
- Legislature terms: 1908–1912; 1912–1915
- Predecessor: Second Katsura Cabinet
- Successor: Third Katsura Cabinet

The Second Saionji Cabinet is the 14th Cabinet of Japan led by Saionji Kinmochi from August 30, 1911, to December 21, 1912.

== Cabinet ==
Second Saionji Cabinet
Portfolio	Minister	Political party	Term start	Term end
Prime Minister	Marquess Saionji Kinmochi	Rikken Seiyūkai	August 30, 1911	December 21, 1912
Minister for Foreign Affairs	Viscount Uchida Kōsai	Independent	August 30, 1911	December 21, 1912
Minister for Foreign Affairs	Count Hayashi Tadasu (acting)	Independent	August 30, 1911	October 16, 1911
Minister of Home Affairs	Hara Takashi	Rikken Seiyūkai	August 30, 1911	December 21, 1912
Minister of Finance	Yamamoto Tatsuo	Independent	August 30, 1911	December 21, 1912
Minister of the Army	Baron Ishimoto Shinroku	Military (Army)	August 30, 1911	April 2, 1912
Minister of the Army	Vacant		April 2, 1912	April 5, 1912
Minister of the Army	Baron Uehara Yūsaku	Military (Army)	April 5, 1912	December 21, 1912
Minister of the Navy	Baron Saitō Makoto	Military (Navy)	August 30, 1911	December 21, 1912
Minister of Justice	Matsuda Masahisa	Rikken Seiyūkai	August 30, 1911	December 21, 1912
Minister of Education	Haseba Sumitaka	Rikken Seiyūkai	August 30, 1911	November 9, 1912
Minister of Education	Baron Makino Nobuaki (acting)	Independent	November 9, 1912	December 21, 1912
Minister of Agriculture and Commerce	Baron Makino Nobuaki	Independent	August 30, 1911	December 21, 1912
Minister of Communications	Count Hayashi Tadasu	Independent	August 30, 1911	December 21, 1912
Chief Cabinet Secretary	Hiroshi Minami	Independent	August 30, 1911	December 21, 1912
Director-General of the Cabinet Legislation Bureau	Yasuhiro Ban’ichirō	Sawakai	August 30, 1911	August 31, 1911
Director-General of the Cabinet Legislation Bureau	Okano Keijirō	Independent	August 31, 1911	December 21, 1912

Preceded by Second Katsura Cabinet	Cabinet of Japan; 1911–1912	Succeeded by Third Katsura Cabinet
