= Hozumi Nobushige =

Japanese politician

Baron Hozumi Nobushige
- 穂積 陳重
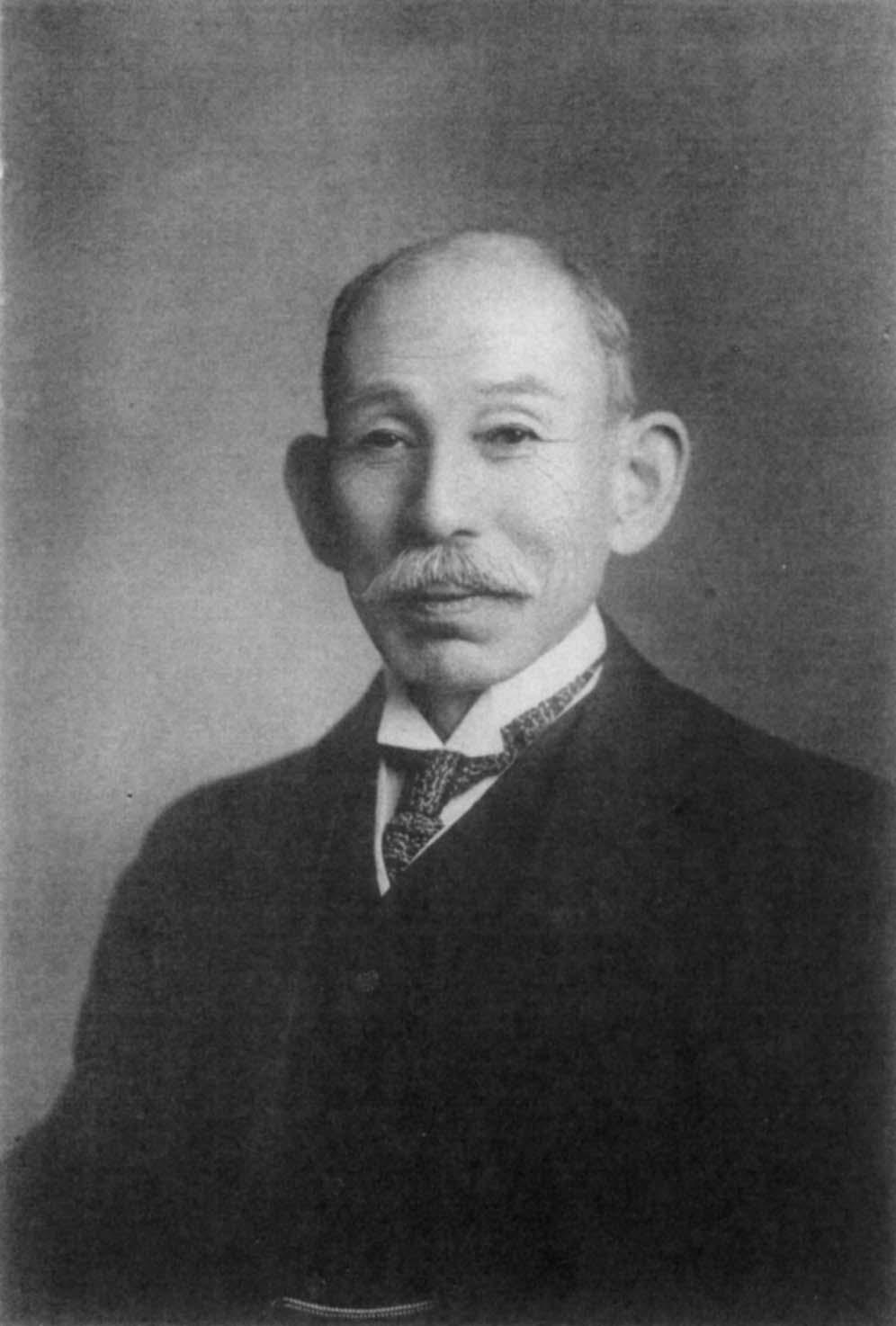
- Hozumi in 1919

President of the Privy Council
- In office 1 October 1925 – 7 April 1926
- Monarch: Taishō
- Vice President: Okano Keijirō; Yūzaburō Kuratomi
- Preceded by: Hamao Arata
- Succeeded by: Kuratomi Yuzaburō

Vice President of the Privy Council
- In office 31 March 1925 – 1 October 1925
- Monarch: Taishō
- President: Hamao Arata
- Preceded by: Ichiki Kitokurō
- Succeeded by: Okano Keijirō

Member of the Privy Council
- In office 26 January 1916 – 31 March 1925
- Monarch: Taishō

Member of the House of Peers
- In office 29 September 1890 – 17 February 1892 Nominated by the Emperor

Personal details
- Born: 23 August 1855 Uwajima, Iyo, Japan
- Died: 7 April 1926 (aged 70) Ushigome, Tokyo, Japan
- Relatives: Hozumi Yatsuka (brother); Shibusawa Eiichi (father-in-law); Tadaatsu Ishiguro (son-in-law)
- Education: Tokyo Imperial University; University of London; Humboldt University of Berlin
- Occupation: Legal Scholar, Educator

Baron Hozumi Nobushige (穂積 陳重; 23 August 1855 – 7 April 1926) was a Japanese statesman and jurist of the Meiji period.

== Early life and education ==
Hozumi was born in Uwajima Domain, Iyo Province (present-day Ehime Prefecture) as the second son to a family of kokugaku scholars. He graduated from the Kaisei Gakko, (the forerunner to Tokyo Imperial University), and studied overseas from 1876-1881. He first traveled to Great Britain, where he attended the University of London and obtained a license as a barrister. He then traveled to Germany, where he attended the Humboldt University of Berlin.

== Career ==
On his return to Japan, Hozumi accepted a post as a professor of German law and of comparative law at Tokyo Imperial University. Together with a group of fellow lawyers, he was a founder of the English Law School, the forerunner of Chuo University, in 1885. In 1888, he was awarded the first doctorate of law in Japan (法学博士). Together with Ume Kenjirō and Tomii Masaaki, he was requested to draft Japan’s Civil Code in 1898. One of his most accomplished students was Kijūrō Shidehara who passed the examination to enter the diplomatic service in 1896, and was Foreign Minister in the 1920s and Prime Minister after World War II.

Hozumi was appointed to the House of Peers in 1890, and the Privy Council in 1916. He was ennobled with the title of danshaku (baron) in 1915 under the kazoku peerage system.

He was the father of legal scholar Hozumi Shigeto and brother to constitutional expert Hozumi Yatsuka.

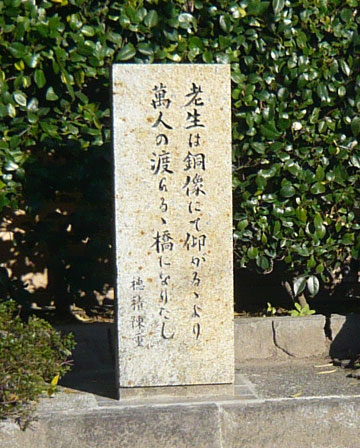
"I would rather be a bridge used by everyone than be a statue." -- Hozumi Nobushige

After his death, there was a discussion in Uwajima city to erect a bronze statue in his honor. However, Hozumi specifically left instructions in his will that if future generations wanted to honor him, it would be better to honor him with something useful, like a bridge, rather than something as worthless as a statue. The “Hozumi Bridge” still exists in Uwajima city to this day. He was also honored by a Japanese commemorative postage stamp in 1998.
