= Second Katsura cabinet =

Japanese cabinet from 1908 to 1911

Second Katsura Cabinet
- 13th Cabinet of Japan
- 1908–1911
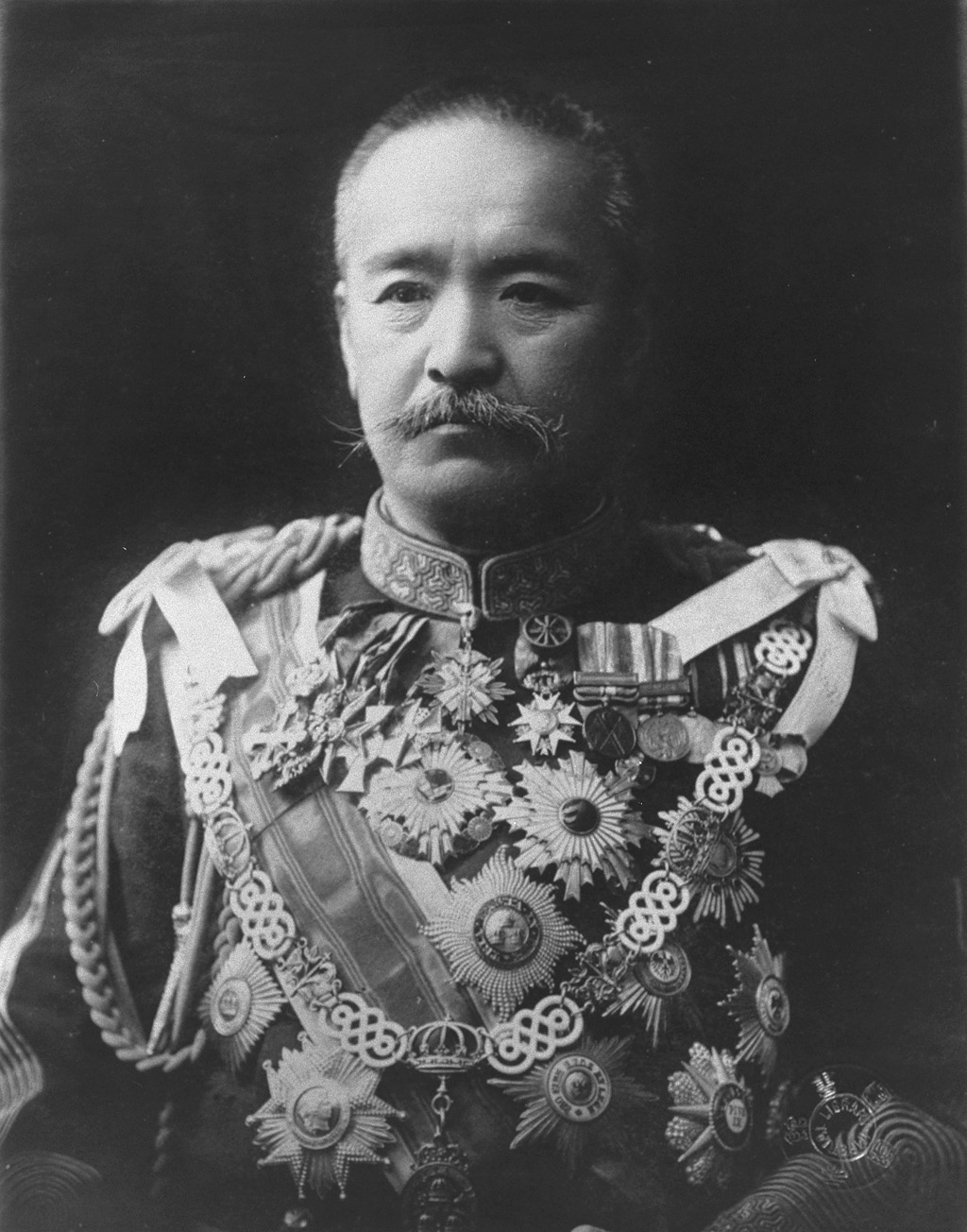
- Prime Minister Katsura Tarō
- Date formed: July 14, 1908
- Date dissolved: August 30, 1911

People and organisations
- Emperor: Meiji
- Prime Minister: Katsura Tarō

History
- Legislature term: 1908–1912
- Predecessor: First Saionji Cabinet
- Successor: Second Saionji Cabinet

The Second Katsura Cabinet (Japanese: 第2次桂内閣) is the 13th Cabinet of Japan led by Katsura Tarō from July 14, 1908, to August 30, 1911.

== Cabinet ==
Second Katsura Cabinet
Portfolio	Minister	Political party	Term start	Term end
Prime Minister	Prince Katsura Tarō	Military (Army)	July 14, 1908	August 30, 1911
Minister for Foreign Affairs	Count Terauchi Masatake (acting)	Military (Army)	July 14, 1908	August 27, 1908
Minister for Foreign Affairs	Count Komura Jutarō	Independent	August 27, 1908	August 30, 1911
Minister of Home Affairs	Viscount Hirata Tosuke	Sawakai	July 14, 1908	August 30, 1911
Minister of Finance	Prince Katsura Tarō	Military (Army)	July 14, 1908	August 30, 1911
Minister of the Army	Count Terauchi Masatake	Military (Army)	July 14, 1908	August 30, 1911
Minister of the Navy	Baron Saitō Makoto	Military (Navy)	July 14, 1908	August 30, 1911
Minister of Justice	Viscount Okabe Nagamoto	Kenkyūkai	July 14, 1908	August 30, 1911
Minister of Education	Komatsubara Eitarō	Sawakai	July 14, 1908	August 30, 1911
Minister of Agriculture and Commerce	Viscount Ōura Kanetake	Sawakai	July 14, 1908	August 30, 1911
Minister of Communications	Baron Gotō Shinpei	Independent	July 14, 1908	August 30, 1911
Chief Cabinet Secretary	Shibata Kamon	Sawakai	July 14, 1908	August 30, 1911
Director-General of the Cabinet Legislation Bureau	Yasuhiro Ban’ichirō	Sawakai	July 14, 1908	August 30, 1911

Preceded by First Saionji Cabinet	Cabinet of Japan; 1908–1911	Succeeded by Second Saionji Cabinet
