= First Yamamoto cabinet =

Cabinet of Japan (1913–1914)

First Yamamoto Cabinet
- 16th Cabinet of Japan

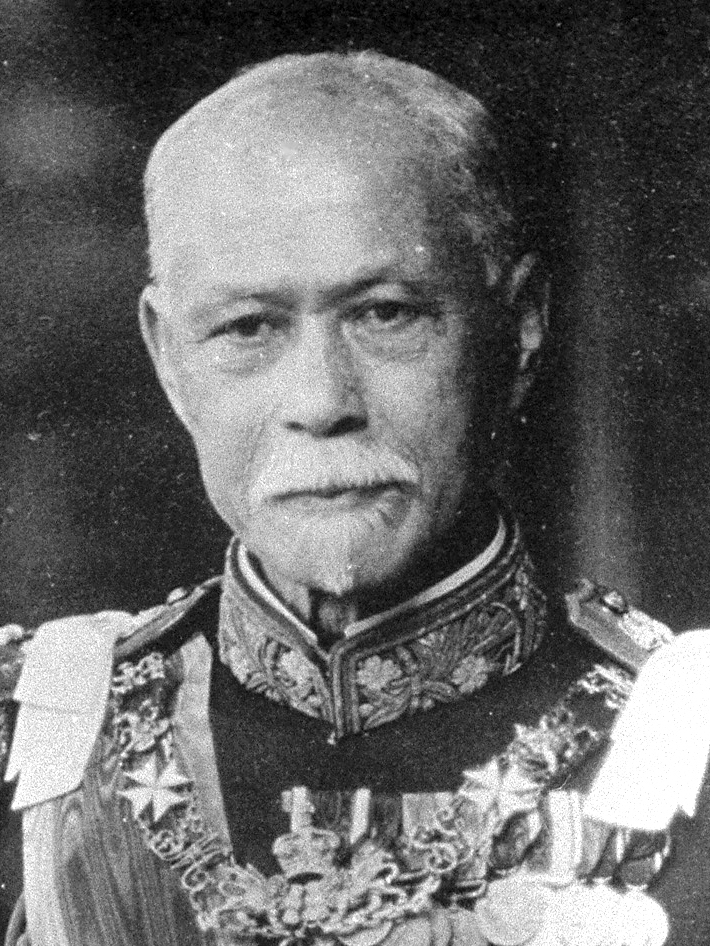
- Prime Minister Yamamoto Gonnohyōe
- Date formed: February 20, 1913
- Date dissolved: April 16, 1914

People and organisations
- Emperor: Taishō
- Prime Minister: Yamamoto Gonnohyōe
- Member party: HoR Blocs: Rikken Seiyūkai; HoP Blocs: Kōuyu Club

History
- Legislature terms: 30th Imperial Diet; 31st Imperial Diet
- Predecessor: Third Katsura Cabinet
- Successor: Second Ōkuma Cabinet

The First Yamamoto Cabinet is the 16th Cabinet of Japan led by Yamamoto Gonnohyōe from February 20, 1913, to April 16, 1914.

== Cabinet ==
Portfolio	Minister	Political party	Term start	Term end
Prime Minister	Count Yamamoto Gonnohyōe	Military (Navy)	February 20, 1913	April 16, 1914
Minister for Foreign Affairs	Baron Makino Nobuaki	Independent	February 20, 1913	April 16, 1914
Minister of Home Affairs	Hara Takashi	Rikken Seiyūkai	February 20, 1913	April 16, 1914
Minister of Finance	Baron Takahashi Korekiyo	Rikken Seiyūkai	February 20, 1913	April 16, 1914
Minister of the Army	Baron Kigoshi Yasutsuna	Military (Army)	February 20, 1913	June 24, 1913
Minister of the Army	Kusunose Yukihiko	Military (Army)	June 24, 1913	April 16, 1914
Minister of the Navy	Baron Saitō Makoto	Military (Navy)	February 20, 1913	April 16, 1914
Minister of Justice	Matsuda Masahisa	Rikken Seiyūkai	February 20, 1913	November 11, 1913
Minister of Justice	Yoshito Okuda (acting)	Rikken Seiyūkai	November 11, 1913	March 6, 1914
Minister of Justice	Yoshito Okuda	Rikken Seiyūkai	March 6, 1914	April 16, 1914
Minister of Education	Yoshito Okuda	Rikken Seiyūkai	February 20, 1913	March 6, 1914
Minister of Education	Ōoka Ikuzō	Rikken Seiyūkai	March 6, 1914	April 16, 1914
Minister of Agriculture and Commerce	Yamamoto Tatsuo	Rikken Seiyūkai	February 20, 1913	April 16, 1914
Minister of Communications	Motoda Hajime	Rikken Seiyūkai	February 20, 1913	April 16, 1914
Chief Cabinet Secretary	Yamanouchi Kazuji	Independent	February 20, 1913	April 16, 1914
Director-General of the Cabinet Legislation Bureau	Okano Keijirō	Rikken Seiyūkai	February 20, 1913	September 20, 1913
Director-General of the Cabinet Legislation Bureau	Kuratomi Yūzaburō	Independent	September 20, 1913	April 16, 1914
