= Lord Keeper of the Privy Seal of Japan =

Former government position in Japan

The Lord Keeper of the Privy Seal of Japan (内大臣, Naidaijin) was an administrative post not of Cabinet rank in the government of the Empire of Japan, responsible for being a direct, personal advisor to the emperor, and keeping the Privy Seal of Japan and State Seal of Japan among other things.

The modern office of the Lord Keeper of the Privy Seal was identical to the old Naidaijin only in name and should not be confused. The office was abolished in 1945 after World War II.

== History ==
=== Meiji period ===
The modern office of the Lord Keeper of the Privy Seal was formed in 1885 after the Meiji government established the Japanese cabinet; however, the Lord Keeper of the Privy Seal was separate from the cabinet and acted as a direct, personal advisor to the Emperor. He was also responsible for the administration of imperial documents such as rescripts and edicts. Petitions to the emperor and the court were also handled by the Lord Keeper's office, as well as the responses.

In 1907, the post was expanded to become the Office of the Lord Keeper of the Privy Seal (内大臣府, Naidaijin-fu) with a chief secretary, three secretaries, and six assistants to handle the increased workload with the passing of the genrō.

=== Shōwa period ===
After the start of Emperor Hirohito's reign in 1925, the office and position of the Lord Keeper of the Privy Seal became increasingly important, at the expense of the office of the Prime Minister. Political infighting within the Diet of Japan further boosted the power of the Lord Keeper. The holder of this position could strictly control who was allowed to have an audience with the emperor and the flow of information.

The position and the office of the Lord Keeper of the Privy Seal were officially abolished on 24 November 1945.

Today, the seals are kept in the care of the Chamberlain of Japan.

== List of officeholders ==
† died in office.

Portrait	Name	Term start	Term end
	Prince; Sanjō Sanetomi 三条 実美 (1837–1891)	22 December 1885	18 February 1891†
	Marquis; Tokudaiji Sanetsune 徳大寺 実則 (1840–1919)	21 February 1891	12 August 1912
	Prince; Katsura Tarō 桂 太郎 (1848–1913)	21 August 1912	21 December 1912
	HIH; Prince Fushimi Sadanaru 伏見宮 貞愛親王 (1858–1923)	21 December 1912	13 January 1915
	Prince; Ōyama Iwao 大山 巌 (1842–1916)	23 April 1915	10 December 1916†
	Marquis; Matsukata Masayoshi 松方 正義 (1835–1924)	2 May 1917	18 September 1922
	Viscount; Hirata Tōsuke 平田 東助 (1849–1925)	19 September 1922	30 March 1925
	Viscount; Hamao Arata 浜尾 新 (1849–1925)	acting (by the President of the Privy Council); 30 March 1925	
	Count; Makino Nobuaki 牧野 伸顕 (1861–1949)	30 March 1925	26 February 1935
	Viscount; Saitō Makoto 斎藤 実 (1858–1936)	26 February 1935	26 February 1936†
	Baron; Ichiki Kitokurō 一木 喜徳郎 (1867–1944)	acting (by the President of the Privy Council); 6 March	
	Yuasa Kurahei 湯浅 倉平 (1874–1940)	6 March 1936	1 June 1940
	Marquis; Kido Kōichi 木戸 幸一 (1889–1977)	1 June 1940	24 November 1945

== See also ==
- Lord Privy Seal
- Keeper of the Seals
