= Shimooka Chūji =

Japanese politician (1870–1925)

- 下岡 忠治
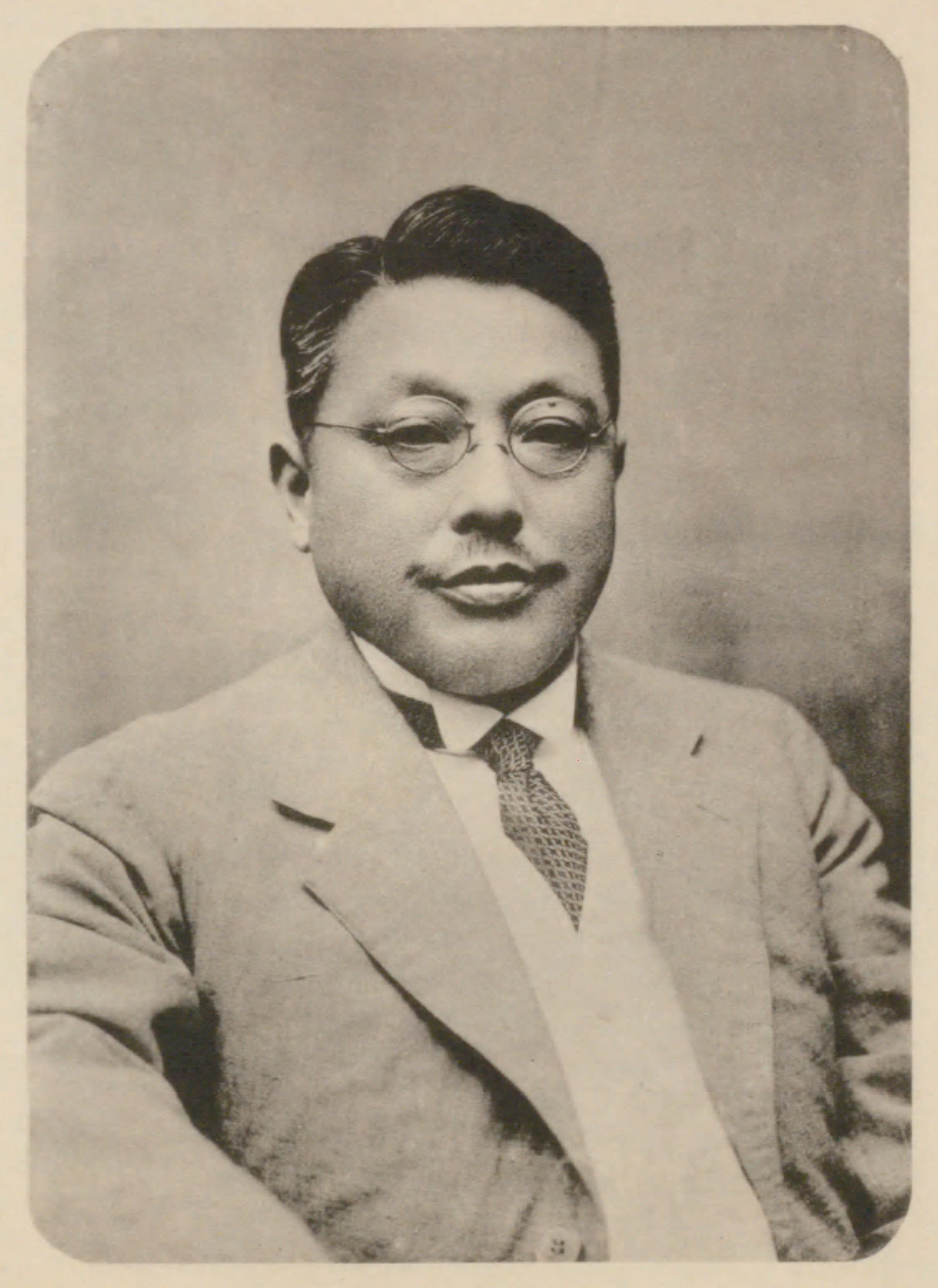

Member of the House of Representatives
- In office 25 March 1915 – 22 November 1925
- Preceded by: Multi-member district
- Succeeded by: Nohara Tanejirō
- Constituency: Hyōgo Counties (1915–1920); Hyōgo 5th (1920–1925)

Governor of Akita Prefecture
- In office 26 November 1906 – 9 October 1908
- Monarch: Meiji
- Preceded by: Seino Chōtarō
- Succeeded by: Mori Masataka

Personal details
- Born: 26 October 1870 Kawabe, Hyōgo, Japan
- Died: 22 November 1925 (aged 55)
- Party: Kenseikai
- Relatives: Takekai Shirane (brother-in-law)
- Education: Third Higher School
- Alma mater: Tokyo Imperial University

Shimooka Chūji (下岡 忠治, 26 October 1870 – 22 November 1925) was a Japanese politician and bureaucrat. He served as Inspector-General of Korea from July 1924 and was a member of the House of Representatives from March 1915, serving in both offices until his death in November 1925. He was the second president of Keijō Imperial University, from July 1924 to November 1925.

== Biography ==
Shimooka was born on October 26, 1870, in Hirone, Kawabe, Settsu Province (present-day Inagawa, Hyōgo), the second son of village headman and sake brewer Shimooka Naokazu. The family moved to Tokyo where Shimooka graduated from Kōjimachi Elementary School. He graduated from Tokyo Imperial University in 1895, having majored in politics.

After graduation, he entered the Home Ministry. He then went on to serve as Counselor of the Legislative Bureau of the Cabinet and Governor of Akita Prefecture.

In 1911, he was appointed Vice-Minister of Agriculture and Commerce. He was then appointed Chief Secretary of the Privy Council of Japan in 1912, and Vice-Minister of Home Affairs in 1913.

In 1914, Shimooka was elected as a member to the House of Representatives and served four terms in office.

Shimooka was appointed Inspector-General of Korea in July 1924, and died in office on November 22, 1925, aged 55.

== See also ==
- Keijō Imperial University
- Chūichi Ariyoshi
- Paul K. Ryu
