= Ichiki Kitokurō =

Japanese politician

Junior First Rank Baron Ichiki Kitokurō
- 一木 喜徳郎
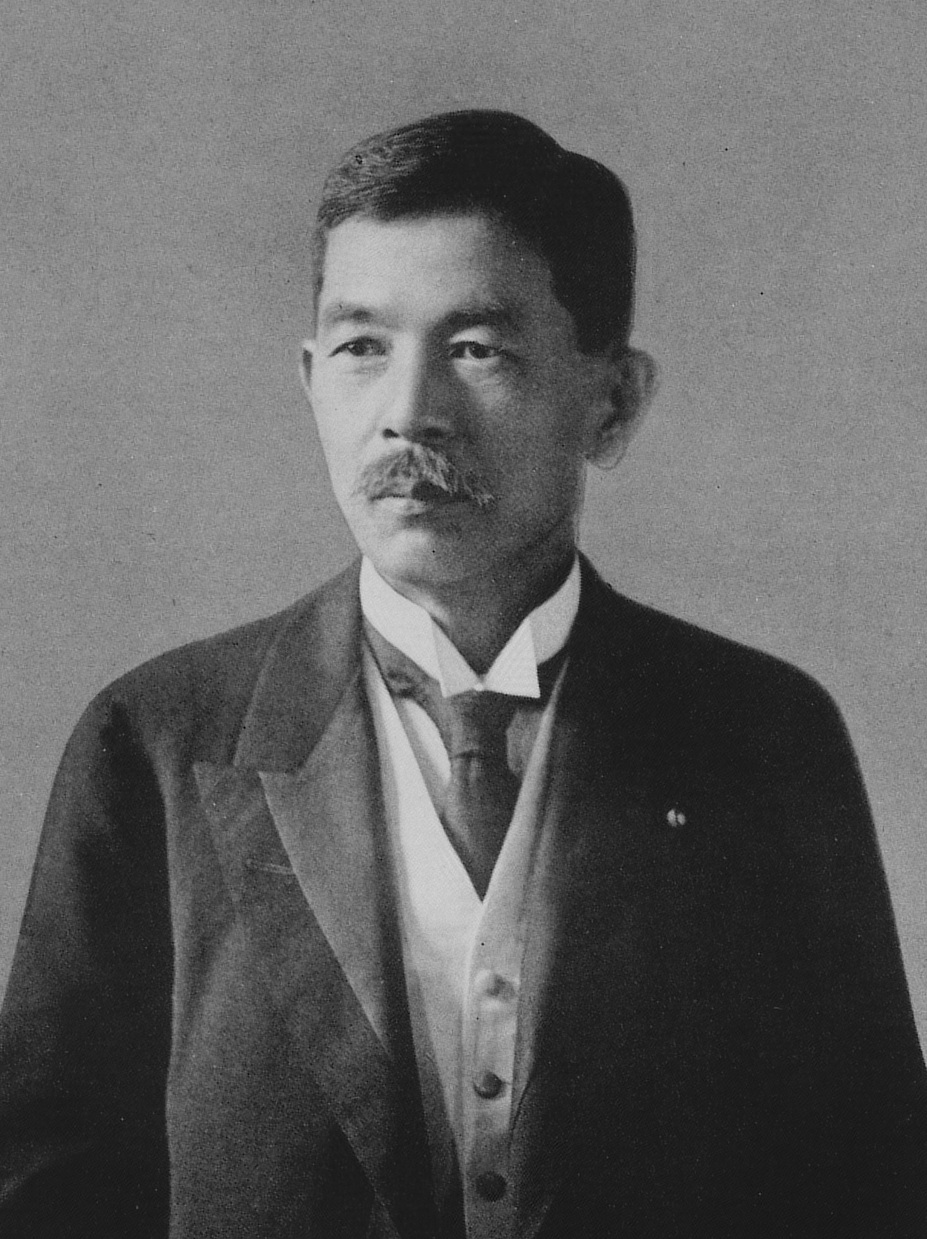

President of the Privy Council
- In office 3 May 1934 – 13 March 1936
- Monarch: Hirohito
- Vice President: Hiranuma Kiichirō
- Preceded by: Kuratomi Yūzaburō
- Succeeded by: Kiichirō Hiranuma

Minister of the Imperial Household
- In office 30 March 1925 – 14 February 1933
- Monarchs: Taishō; Hirohito
- Preceded by: Makino Nobuaki
- Succeeded by: Yuasa Kurahei

Vice President of the Privy Council
- In office 14 January 1924 – 30 March 1925
- Monarch: Taishō
- President: Hamao Arata
- Preceded by: Hamao Arata
- Succeeded by: Hozumi Nobushige

Minister of Home Affairs
- In office 10 August 1915 – 9 October 1916
- Prime Minister: Ōkuma Shigenobu
- Preceded by: Ōkuma Shigenobu
- Succeeded by: Gotō Shinpei

Minister of Education
- In office 16 April 1914 – 10 August 1915
- Prime Minister: Ōkuma Shigenobu
- Preceded by: Ōoka Ikuzō
- Succeeded by: Takata Sanae

Member of the Privy Council
- In office 14 August 1917 – 14 January 1924
- Monarch: Taishō

Member of the House of Peers
- In office 26 September 1900 – 30 August 1917 Nominated by the Emperor

Personal details
- Born: 7 May 1867 Kakegawa, Shizuoka, Japan
- Died: 17 December 1944 (aged 77) Tokyo, Japan
- Relatives: Ryōhei Ogada (brother)
- Education: Tokyo Imperial University
- Occupation: Legal scholar, cabinet minister, Privy Council member/president

Baron Ichiki Kitokurō (一木 喜徳郎; 7 May 1867 – 17 December 1944) was a Japanese statesman. He served as Minister of Education (1914), Home Minister (1915), Imperial Household Minister (1925), and President of the Privy Council (1934–1936).

== Biography ==
Ichiki was born in what is now Kakegawa, Shizuoka Prefecture, where his father, an entrepreneur and politician, was a student of the philosophies of Ninomiya Sontoku.

Ichiki graduated from the Tokyo Imperial University in 1887 and entered the Home Ministry in the same year. In 1890, he was sent to Germany for further studies, returning to Japan in 1894. On his return, he became a professor of law at Tokyo Imperial University, and in 1906 became a member of the prestigious Imperial Academy. Meanwhile, in September 1900, he was appointed as a life-term member of the House of Peers by imperial order.

From 1902 to 1906, Ichiki also served as Director-General of the Cabinet Legislation Bureau. He served again in the same capacity from 1912 to 1913. He joined the cabinet under the 2nd Ōkuma administration first as Minister of Education in 1914 and then as Home Minister in the following year. Although it wasn't required by the law, he gave up the life-term upper-house seat in August 1917 when he was appointed as a member of the Privy Council. In 1925, Ichiki became Imperial Household Minister.

Ichiki was awarded the Grand Cordon of the Order of the Sacred Treasure (1st class) in December 1915, and the Grand Cordon of the Order of the Rising Sun (1st class) in July 1916. He attained the even higher Grand Cordon of the Order of the Paulownia Flowers (1st class) in December 1928. He was then made baron (danshaku) by the emperor in 1933.

From 1934 to 1936, Ichiki was president of the Privy Council. This coincided with a period of considerable controversy over the role of the monarchy in Japan, especially centered around the works of Tatsukichi Minobe, a professor of constitutional law at Tokyo Imperial University and one of Ichiki’s former students.

After the assassination of Saitō Makoto, the Lord Keeper of the Privy Seal and the former prime pinister in the February 26 Incident in 1936, Ichiki acted as Lord Keeper for one day on 6 March 1936, in order to have the successor formally appointed by the emperor. Then he was effectively forced into retirement by Kiichirō Hiranuma, the right-wing former Prosecutor General and his political nemesis, who took over the presidency of the Privy Council. Ichiki retired to his native Kakegawa, and on his death was awarded the Grand Cordon of the Supreme Order of the Chrysanthemum. His grave is at the Yanaka Cemetery in Tokyo.

Political offices
Preceded by Ōoka Ikuzō	Minister of Education; 16 April 1914 – 10 August 1915	Succeeded by Takata Sanae
Preceded by Ōkuma Shigenobu	Home Minister; 10 August 1915 – 9 October 1916	Succeeded by Gotō Shinpei
Preceded by Makino Nobuaki	Imperial Household Minister; 30 March 1925 – 14 February 1933	Succeeded by Kurahei Yuasa
Preceded by Kuratomi Yūzaburō	President, Privy Council; 5 May 1934 – 13 March 1936	Succeeded by Kiichirō Hiranuma
