= Itō (surname) =

- Pronunciation: [itoː]
- Language: Japanese

Origin
- Region of origin: Japan

Itō, Ito, Itou, Itoh or Itoo (written: 伊藤 or いとう in hiragana) is the sixth most common Japanese surname. Another Kanji variant shares the same pronunciation is 伊東.

== Notable people with the surname ==
- Aiko Itō (いとう あいこ; born 1980), Japanese actress
- Aimi Ito (伊藤 亜衣美; born 1983), Japanese handball player
- Akihiro Ito (伊藤 明弘), Japanese manga artist
- Akira Ito (disambiguation), multiple people
- Asako Ito (いとう あさこ; born 1970), Japanese comedian
- Atsushi Ito (disambiguation), multiple people
- Ayako Ito (伊藤 綾子; born 1980), Japanese announcer
- Ayuko Ito (伊藤 亜由子; born 1986), Japanese speed skater
- Ayumi Ito (伊藤 歩; born 1980), Japanese actress
- Ayasa Itō (伊藤 彩沙; born 1996), Japanese voice actress
- Chiaki Ito (伊藤 千晃; born 1987), Japanese singer, actress, dancer and model
- Chieko Ito (伊東 千恵子; born 1954), Japanese speed skater
- Chūta Itō (伊東 忠太; 1867–1954), Japanese architect, architectural historian and critic
- Daisuke Itō (disambiguation), multiple people
- Dan Ito (伊藤 壇; born 1975), Japanese footballer
- David Ito (born 1966), Japanese comedian, actor and businessman
- Einosuke Itō (伊藤 永之介; 1903–1959), Japanese writer
- Eri Itō (伊東 恵里), Japanese singer
- Fujio Ito (伊藤 富士夫; born 1945), Japanese cyclist
- Fumiko Ito (伊藤 文子; born 1940), Japanese long jumper
- Fumio Ito (伊藤 史朗; 1939–1991), Japanese motorcycle racer
- Genboku Itō (伊東 玄朴; 1801–1871), Japanese surgeon
- Hanae Ito (伊藤 華英; born 1985), Japanese swimmer
- Hayata Ito (伊藤 隼太; born 1989), Japanese baseball player
- Heiichiro Ito (伊藤 平一郎; born 1990), Japanese rugby union player
- Hideaki Itō (伊藤 英明; born 1975), Japanese actor
- Hidetada Ito (井藤 英忠; born 1959), Japanese handball player
- Hikaru Ito (伊藤 光; born 1989), Japanese baseball player
- Hirobumi Itō (伊藤 博文; 1841–1909), Prime Minister of Japan in the late 19th century
- Hirofumi Itō (伊藤 博文; born 1960), Japanese shogi player
- Hiroki Ito (disambiguation), multiple people
- Hiromi Itō (伊藤 比呂美; born 1955), Japanese writer
- Hiroyuki Ito (伊藤 裕之), Japanese game producer, director and designer
- Iccho Itoh (伊藤 一長; 1945–2007), Japanese mayor
- Ichiro Ito (伊藤 一朗; born 1967), Japanese guitarist
- Ikuko Itoh (伊藤 郁子), Japanese character designer and animator
- Ittōsai Itō (伊東 一刀斎; fl. 1560–1653), Japanese swordsman
- Jakuchū Itō (伊藤 若冲; 1716–1800), Japanese painter
- Jeremy Ito (born 1986), American football player
- Jerry Ito (1927–2007), American actor
- Jinsai Itō (伊藤 仁斎; 1627–1705), Japanese Confucian philosopher and educator
- Joi Ito (伊藤 穰一; born 1966), Japanese activist, entrepreneur and venture capitalist
- Junichiro Ito (伊藤 順一郎; born 1954), Japanese medical researcher and psychiatrist
- Junji Ito (伊藤 潤二; born 1963), Japanese horror manga artist
- Junji Ito (fighter) (伊藤 淳二; born 1986), Japanese mixed martial artist
- Junki Ito (伊藤 準規; born 1991), Japanese baseball player
- Junko Itō, American linguist
- Junya Itō (伊東 純也; born 1993), Japanese footballer
- Kana Ito (伊東 可奈; born 1985), Japanese badminton player
- Kanae Itō (伊藤 かな恵; born 1986), Japanese voice actress
- Kanako Itō (いとう かなこ; born 1973), Japanese singer
- Kanako Itō (footballer) (伊藤 香菜子; born 1983), Japanese women's footballer
- Kaori Ito (伊藤 郁女; born 1979), Japanese dancer and choreographer
- Katsuji Ito (伊藤 勝二; born 1946), Japanese swimmer
- Kazue Itoh (伊藤 かずえ; born 1966), Japanese actress
- Kazue Ito (softball) (伊藤 良恵; born 1977), Japanese softball player
- Kazunori Itō (伊藤 和典; born 1954), Japanese anime screenwriter and artist
- Kazuyoshi Itō (伊藤 和幸), Japanese astronomer
- Kei Ito (伊東 慧; born 1991), Japanese photographer and installation artist
- Keisuke Ito (伊藤 圭介; 1803–1901), Japanese physician and biologist
- Keisuke Ito (swimmer) (伊藤 圭祐; 1943–2006), Japanese swimmer
- Kenichi Itō (disambiguation), multiple people
- Kenji Ito (伊藤 賢治; born 1968), Japanese video game composer and musician
- Kentarō Itō (伊藤 健太郎; born 1974), Japanese voice actor
- Kimiko Itoh (伊藤 君子; born 1946), Japanese jazz singer
- Kisaku Itō (伊藤 熹朔; 1899–2008), Japanese art director
- Kiyomi Itō (伊藤 清美), Japanese actress
- Kiyosi Itô (伊藤 清; 1915–2008), Japanese mathematician
- Koji Ito (伊東 浩司; born 1970), Japanese sprinter
- Kosuke Ito (politician) (伊藤 公介; born 1941), Japanese politician
- Kumataro Ito (伊藤 熊太郎; c. 1860 – c. 1930), Japanese illustrator
- Kunimitsu Itō (伊藤 国光; born 1955), Japanese long-distance runner
- Lance Ito (born 1950), American judge
- Mai Ito (伊藤 舞; born 1984), Japanese long-distance runner
- Maiko Itō (いとう まい子; born 1964), Japanese actress
- Maki Ito (伊藤 麻希; born 1995), Japanese professional wrestler
- Makiko Ito (伊藤 真貴子; born 1973), Japanese long-distance runner
- Makito Ito (伊藤 槙人; born 1992), Japanese footballer
- Makoto Itoh (伊藤 誠; 1936–2023), Japanese economist
- Mancio Itō (伊東 マンショ; 1570–1612), the first official Japanese emissary to Europe
- Marika Itō (伊藤 万理華; born 1996), Japanese actress, artist, model and idol
- Maryanne Ito (born 1983), American musician
- Mary Ito, Canadian television and radio personality
- Masahiro Ito (伊藤 暢達), Japanese video game artist
- Masahiro Itō (伊藤 昌弘), Japanese voice actor and singer
- Masakazu Ito (伊藤 雅和; born 1988), Japanese cyclist
- Masaki Ito (伊藤 正樹; born 1988), Japanese trampolinist
- Masanori Ito (disambiguation), multiple people
- Masao Ito (伊藤 正男; 1928–2018), Japanese neuroscientist
- Masashi Itō (伊藤 正; 1921–2004), Japanese World War II holdout
- Masatoshi Ito (伊藤 雅俊; 1924–2023), Japanese businessman
- Masayoshi Ito (伊東 正義; 1913–1994), Japanese politician and Prime Minister of Japan
- Masumi Itō (伊藤 真澄), also known as Hikaru Nanase, Japanese singer and composer
- Megumi Itō (synchronized swimmer) (伊東 恵; born 1966), Japanese synchronized swimmer
- Michio Itō (伊藤 道郎; 1892-1961), Japanese choreographer
- Midori Ito (伊藤 みどり; born 1969), Japanese figure skater
- Mika Itō (伊藤 美加; born 1956), birth name of Mika Doi, Japanese voice actress
- Mika Itō (伊藤 実華; born 1984), Japanese voice actress
- Miki Itō (伊藤 美紀; born 1962), Japanese voice actor
- Miki Itō (skier) (伊藤 みき; born 1987), Japanese freestyle skier
- Miku Itō (伊藤 美来; born 1996), Japanese voice actress and singer
- Mima Ito (伊藤 美誠; born 2000), Japanese table tennis player
- Minoru Ito (disambiguation), multiple people
- Misaki Ito (伊東 美咲; born 1977) Japanese actress and model
- Miyako Itō (伊東 みやこ; born 1969), Japanese voice actress
- Miyoji Itō (伊東 巳代治; 1857–1934), Japanese politician
- Miyoko Ito (1918–1983), American artist
- Mizuko Ito (伊藤 瑞子; born 1968), Japanese cultural anthropologist
- Naganori Ito (伊藤 修令; born 1937), Japanese automotive engineer
- Naoji Ito (伊藤 直司; born 1959), Japanese footballer
- Naoto Itō (伊藤 直人; born 1969), Japanese ski jumper
- Naoyuki Itō (伊藤 尚往), Japanese anime director
- Noe Itō (伊藤 野枝; 1895–1923), Japanese writer, social critic and feminist
- Noizi Ito (いとう のいぢ; born 1977), Japanese manga artist
- Noriko Itō (伊東 範子; born 1962), better known as Noriko Hidaka, Japanese voice actress
- Norio Ito (伊東 徳雄; born 1948), Japanese ice hockey player
- Ogura Yonesuke Itoh (1870–1940), Japanese-American artist
- Ran Ito (伊藤 蘭; born 1955), Japanese actress
- Reitaro Ito (伊藤 礼太郎; 1925–2007), Japanese sculptor
- Reona Ito (伊藤 玲阿奈; born 1979), Japanese conductor
- Risa Itō (伊藤 理佐; born 1969), Japanese manga artist
- Risako Itō (伊藤 梨沙子; born 1996), Japanese actress, model and gravure idol
- Robert Ito (born 1931), Canadian actor and voice actor
- Ryotaro Ito (伊藤 涼太郎; born 1998), Japanese footballer
- Ryoya Ito (伊藤 遼哉; born 1998), Japanese footballer
- Ryuji Ito (伊東 竜二; born 1976), Japanese professional wrestler
- Ryuji Ito (footballer) (伊藤 竜司; born 1990), Japanese footballer
- Saburo Ito (伊藤 三郎; 1915–?), Japanese swimmer
- Sachio Itō (伊藤 左千夫; 1864–1913), Japanese tanka poet and novelist
- Sachiko Ito (伊藤 幸子; born 1975), Japanese softball player
- Sae Itō (伊藤 沙恵; born 1993), Japanese shogi player
- Sairi Ito (伊藤 沙莉; born 1994), Japanese actress
- Sakiko Ito (伊藤 咲子; born 1958), Japanese singer and actress
- Satoko Ito (伊藤 聡子; born 1967), Japanese television personality
- Satoshi Itō (伊藤 聡; 1974–2009), the real name of Project Itoh, Japanese science fiction writer and essayist
- Saya Ito (born 1999), Japanese kickboxer
- Sayako Ito (伊東 紗冶子; born 1994), Japanese announcer and television personality
- Sei Itō (伊藤 整; 1905–1969), also known as Hitoshi Itō, Japanese poet, writer and translator
- Seiichi Itō (伊藤 整一; 1890–1945), Imperial Japanese Navy admiral
- Seiu Ito (伊藤 晴雨; 1882–1961), Japanese painter
- Setsuo Itō (伊藤 節生; born 1991), Japanese voice actor
- Sharon Ito (born 1960), American journalist
- Shigeo Itoh (伊藤 繁雄), Japanese table tennis player
- Shimpei Itoh (伊藤 伸平) (born 1960), Japanese manga artist
- Shin Ito (born 1964), Japanese wingsuit pilot and skydiver
- Shingo Ito (disambiguation), multiple people
- Shinichi Ito (伊藤 真一; born 1966), Japanese motorcycle racer
- Shinji Ito (伊東 慎治; born 1963), Japanese swimmer
- Shinjō Itō (伊藤 真乗; 1906–1989), Japanese Buddhist
- Shinobu Ito (footballer) (伊藤 仁; born 1983), Japanese footballer
- Shinsui Itō (伊東 深水; 1898–1972), Japanese artist
- Shintaro Ito (伊藤 信太郎; born 1953), Japanese politician
- Shigeru Itō (伊藤茂; 1928–2016), Japanese politician
- Shiori Itō (伊藤 詩織; born 1989), Japanese journalist
- Shirō Itō (伊東 四朗; born 1937), Japanese actor and comedian
- Shizuka Itō (伊藤 静; born 1980), Japanese voice actress and singer
- Sho Ito (伊藤 翔; born 1988), Japanese footballer
- Shoji Ito (伊藤 鐘史; born 1980), Japanese rugby union player
- Shun Ito (伊東 俊; born 1987), Japanese footballer
- Shunsuke Ito (伊藤 俊介; born 1976), Japanese swimmer, Japanese freestyle swimmer
- Shuntarō Itō (伊東 俊太郎; 1930–2023), Japanese historian of science
- Shunya Itō (伊藤 俊也; born 1937), Japanese film director
- Soichiro Ito (sport shooter) (伊東 総一郎; born 1947), Japanese sport shooter
- Soichiro Ito (politician) (伊東 総一郎; 1924–2001), Japanese politician
- Suketaka Itō (伊東 祐兵; 1559–1600), Japanese samurai and daimyō
- Sukeyuki Itō (伊東 祐亨; 1843–1914), Imperial Japanese Navy admiral
- Susumu Ito (1919–2015), American cell biologist and soldier
- Tadahiko Ito (伊藤 忠彦; born 1964), Japanese politician
- Takahiro Itō (伊藤 隆大; 1987–2009), Japanese actor and voice actor
- Takami Itō (伊藤 たかみ; born 1971), Japanese writer
- Takanobu Ito (伊東 孝紳; born 1953), Japanese businessman
- Takanori Ito (伊藤 貴則; born 1993), Japanese professional wrestler
- Takao Ito (伊藤 高男; 1952–2021), Japanese ski jumper
- Takashi Ito (伊藤 隆; born 1970), Japanese kickboxer
- Takatoshi Ito (伊藤 隆敏; born 1950), Japanese economist and academic
- Takehiko Itō (伊東 岳彦), Japanese manga artist
- Takenori Ito, Japanese mixed martial artist
- Takeo Itō (伊東 武夫; 1889–1965), Japanese general
- Takeo Ito (field hockey) (伊藤 赳夫; 1915–?), Japanese field hockey player
- Takeomi Ito (伊藤 剛臣; born 1971), Japanese rugby union player
- Takeshi Ito (伊藤 健史; born 1987), Japanese footballer
- Takuma Ito (disambiguation), multiple people
- Tari Ito (1951–2021), Japanese performance artist
- Tatsuma Ito (伊藤 竜馬; born 1988), Japanese tennis player
- Tatsuya Ito (disambiguation), multiple people
- Teiji Ito (伊藤 貞司; 1935–1982), Japanese composer
- Terry Ito (born 1949), Japanese director, television producer, critic and writer
- Teruyoshi Ito (伊東 輝悦; born 1974), Japanese footballer
- Tetsuya Ito (伊藤 哲也; born 1970), Japanese footballer
- Tomohiko Ito (disambiguation), multiple people
- Tomohiro Ito (伊藤 友広; born 1982), Japanese sprinter
- Tomohito Ito (伊藤 智仁; born 1970), Japanese baseball player
- Tomoya Ito (伊藤 智也; born 1963), Japanese Paralympic athlete
- Toshihito Ito (伊藤 俊人; 1962–2002), Japanese actor
- Toshiyoshi Itō (伊藤 雋吉; 1840–1921), Imperial Japanese Navy admiral
- Toyo Ito (伊東 豊雄; born 1941), Japanese architect
- Tsugio Ito (伊藤 次男; born 1942), Japanese rower
- Tsutomu Ito (伊東 勤; born 1962), Japanese baseball player and manager
- Wataru Ito (伊藤 渉; born 1969), Japanese politician
- Willie Ito (born 1934), American animator
- Yasuhide Ito (伊藤 康英; born 1960), Japanese classical composer
- Yasuyuki Ito (伊藤 靖倖; born 1938), Japanese boxer
- Yoji Ito (伊藤 庸二; 1901–1955), Japanese engineer and scientist
- Yoshihiko Itō (伊藤 義彦; born 1951), Japanese photographer
- Yoshihiko Ito (chemist) (伊藤 嘉彦; 1937–2006), Japanese chemist
- Yoshihiro Ito (disambiguation), multiple people
- Yoshiko Ito (伊藤 佳子; born 1962), Japanese sport shooter
- Yoshisuke Itō (伊東 義祐; 1512–1585), Japanese daimyō
- Yoshitaka Ito (伊藤 喜剛; born 1970), Japanese sprinter
- Yousuke Itou (伊藤 陽佑; born 1984), Japanese actor and singer
- Yuichi Ito (井藤 祐一; born 1986), Japanese tennis player
- Yūichirō Itō (伊藤 祐一郎; born 1947), Japanese politician
- Yuji Ito (footballer) (伊藤 裕二; born 1965), Japanese footballer
- Yuji Ito (fighter), Japanese mixed martial artist
- Yuki Ito (disambiguation), multiple people
- Yukitoshi Ito (伊東 幸敏; born 1993), Japanese footballer
- Yuko Ito (伊藤 裕子; born 1974), Japanese fashion model and actress
- Yuna Ito (born 1983), American singer-songwriter and actress
- Yūnosuke Itō (伊藤 雄之助; 1919–1980), Japanese actor
- Yuta Ito (伊藤 優汰; born 1992), Japanese footballer
- Yuzuki Ito (伊藤 優津樹; born 1974), Japanese footballer
- Yuzuru Ito (before 1989 – 2000), quality assurance expert
- Rina Itou (いとう りな; born 1988), Japanese singer and guitarist

== Fictional characters ==
- Itō (伊藤), a character in the manga series Hikaru no Go
- Ayami Itō, a character in the video game Tokyo Dark
- Keita Itō (伊藤 啓太), a character in the media franchise Gakuen Heaven
- Kōsaku Itō, a character in the 2017 romantic drama film My Teacher based on the manga series of the same name
- Makoto Ito (伊藤 誠), protagonist of the visual novel School Days
- Satomi Ito, a character in the television series Teen Wolf
- Saya Itō, a character in Japanese drama series Half Blue Sky
- Isa Itou, a character in the sci-fi survival horror game Signalis

== See also ==
- Itō clan, a Japanese clan
