= Einosuke =

- Gender: Male

Origin
- Origin: Japanese
- Meaning: Different meanings depending on the kanji used

Einosuke (written: 栄之助, 永之助 or 永之介) is a masculine Japanese given name. Notable people with the name include:

- Einosuke Akiya (秋谷 栄之助; born 1930), Japanese Buddhist leader
- Einosuke Harada (原田 永之助; 1892–1946), Japanese ophthalmologist
- Einosuke Itō (伊藤 永之介; 1903–1959), Japanese writer
- Moriyama Einosuke (森山 栄之助; 1820–1872), Japanese samurai
