= Chiba Takusaburō =

Japanese political activist and schoolteacher

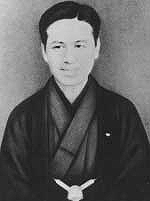
Chiba Takusaburō

Chiba Takusaburō (千葉 卓三郎; 17 June 1852 – 12 November 1883)—also known as Chiba Takuron—lived as an obscure liberal political activist and schoolteacher in the late Tokugawa, early Meiji period. In his younger years, Takusaburō studied Confucian, Buddhist, Christian and Methodist thought. In his later years, Takusaburō devoted his life in disseminating the importance of liberty and rights for the people. His numerous texts include the draft constitution in 1880 (influenced by texts regarding English, German and American models of governmental structure), The Institutional Maxims of Chiba Takusaburō, Treatise on the Kingly Way, and On the Futility of Book Learning. Takusaburō died in late 1883 after a long battle with tuberculosis. Chiba Takusaburō attempted to bring forth a "grass roots" society, driven by the people. Chiba is emblematic of how the revolutionary spirit, more frequently attributed to men like Itagaki Taisuke, Ōkuma Shigenobu and Fukuzawa Yukichi, was existent in even low ranking samurai during the Freedom and People's Rights Movement or Jiyū Minken Undō.

== Background ==
After the fall of the Tokugawa shogunate in 1868, the Meiji era began. Though acting in the name of imperial interests, the Meiji Restoration consolidated all power to an oligarchy, composed of the old samurai elite. By the 1870s, political protest against the new Meiji government emerged. Formerly a leader of the Restoration, Itagaki Taisuke urged the public to end the tyranny of the inner elite dominating the government. This Freedom and People's Rights Movement petitioned for a national assembly elected by the people. When the government rejected the petition in 1874, the People's Rights Movement increasingly mobilized the agitated urban public. The voices of revolution and modern consciousness soon reached even remote mountain villages.

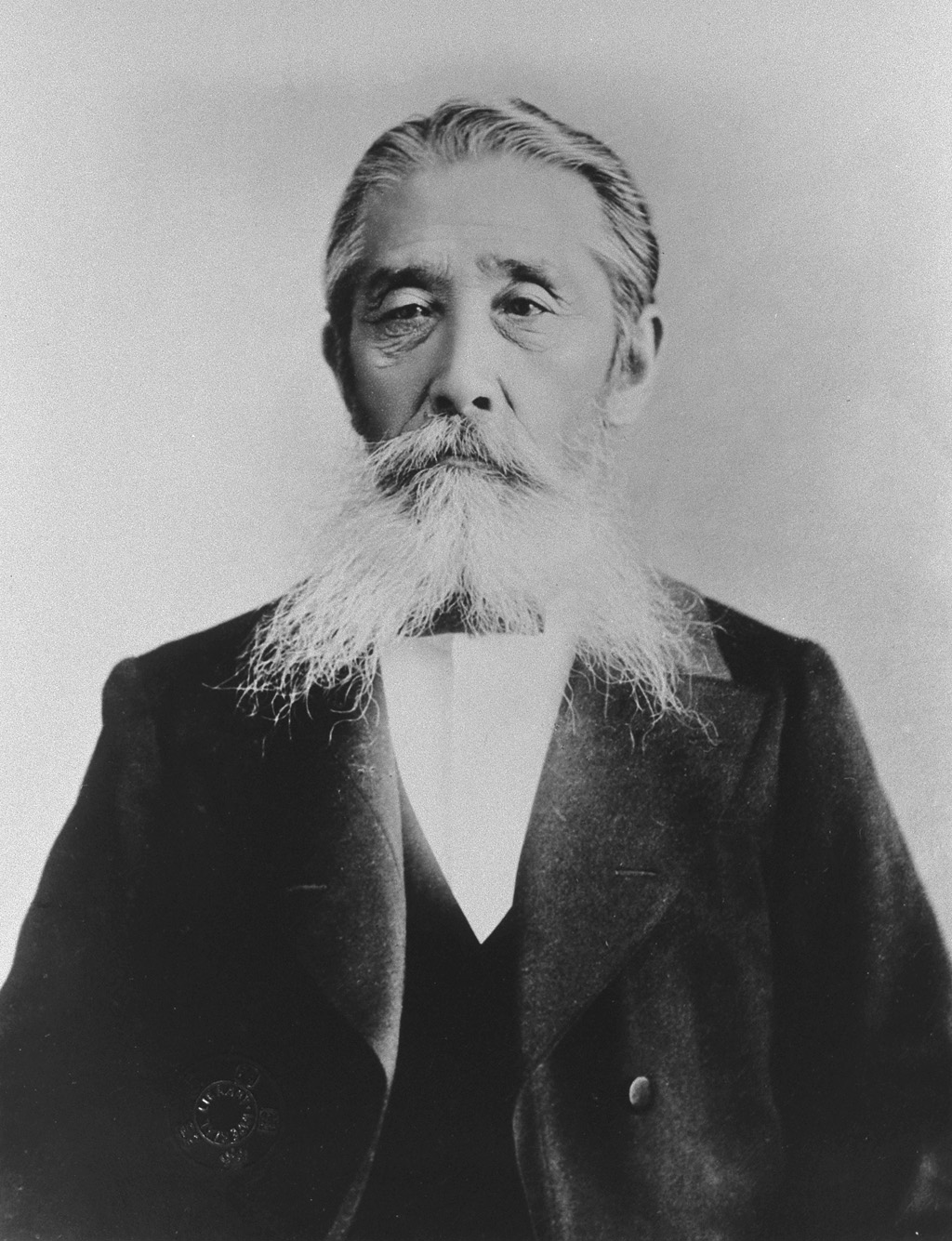
Itagaki Taisuke

== Early life ==
On 17 June 1852, Chiba Takusaburō was born into a rural samurai family in the Shirahata village of Kurihara county. Separated from his biological mother at the age of three, Takusaburō was raised by his foster mother Sada along with his older brother Rihachi. At the age of 12, Takusaburō became a student of Confucian scholar Ōtsuki Bankei and began his formal education. However, his education at the Sendai domain school was cut short by the Boshin War. Answering the fervent cries of Sendai Domain troops to support the ruling Tokugawa government, Takusaburō left Ōtsuki to Shirakawaguchi where he engaged in combat twice against the new government army. When returning home, Takusaburō found his old teacher arrested and imprisoned for his role in resisting Satchōdo forces.

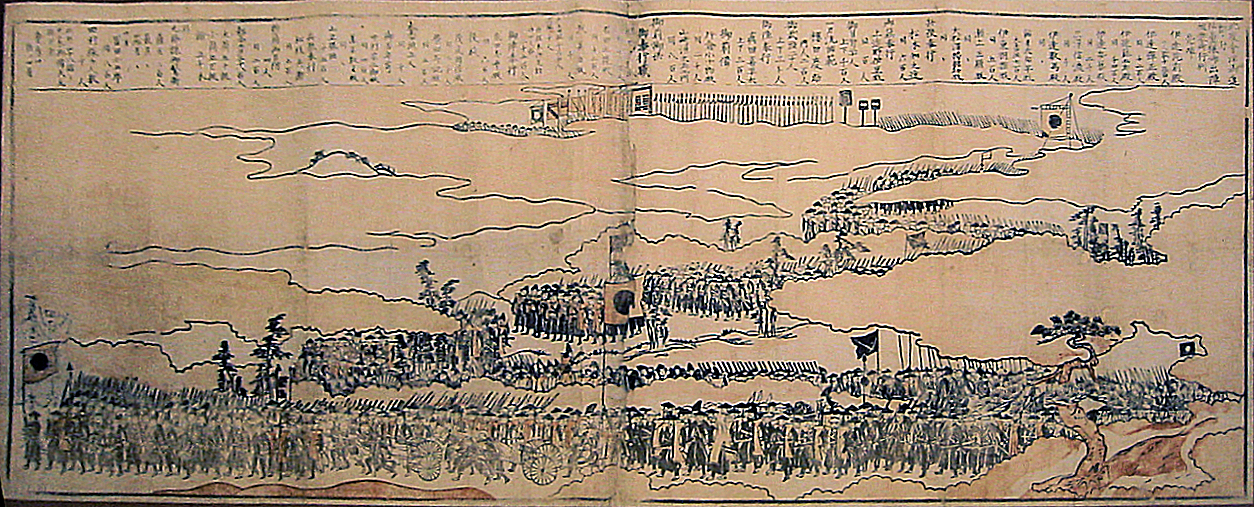
Sendai troops against Meiji government forces in April, 1868

== "Wanderer Seeking Truth" ==
After Bankei's arrest and the establishment of the Meiji government, Takusaburō began studying medicine under Ishikawa Ōsho. A progressive minded doctor near Sendai, Ōsho began his own studies under Itō Genboku and several Dutch doctors in Nagasaki in the late Tokugawa era. Greatly revered by Ōtsuki's students, Ōsho appealed to Takusaburō with his pioneering intellectual views. Facing a similar fate as Ōtsuki himself, Ōsho was arrested and imprisoned by the new Meiji government for "aiding and abetting the shōgun".

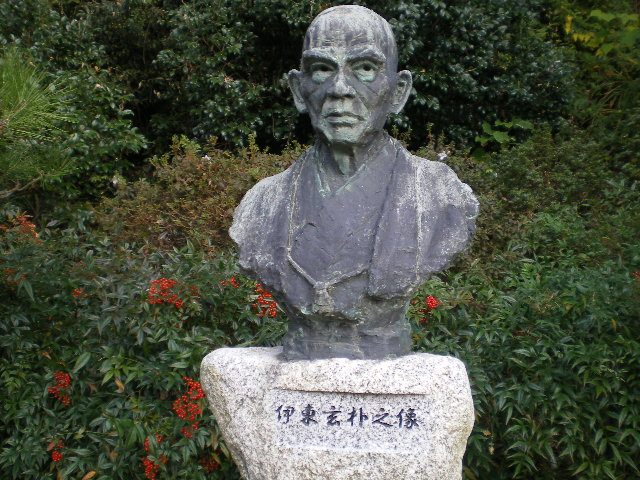
Itō Genboku

In 1868, Takusaburō began his studies of National Learning, known as kokugaku, under Nabeshima Ichirō in Kesennuma. In Nabeshima, an eccentric teacher educating students in both arithmetic and classical Japanese literature, Takusaburō hoped to discover the ideology of the Meiji government. Kokugaku studies encapsulated the philosophy behind the sonnō jōi movement "Revere the Emperor," and contributed to the dissent against the Tokugawa shogunate. Unlike Takusaburō's previous teachers, Nabeshima emphasized the importance of the return of the Emperor's rule and the divine spirit of the imperial ancestors. Four years later, in 1872, Takusaburō began his studies under a Pure Land Buddhist monk known as Sakurai Kyohaku. However, as Christian thought reached northeastern Japan, Takusaburō left his Buddhist studies after five months and turned to the tutelage of Father Nikolai.

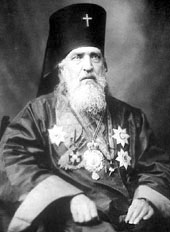
Father Nikolai

Born as Ivan Dimitriyevich Kasatkin in 1836, Father Nikolai dreamed of traveling to Japan after reading Captain Vasily Golovnin's, Memoirs of a Captivity in Japan in St. Petersburg. When ordained in 1860, Father Nikolai received permission to reside in Hokkaidō as the new Russian consulate. Though he could not propagate Christian beliefs publicly, as anti-Christian bans were still imposed by Japanese government, Father Nikolai devoted seven years to the study of Japanese language, history, and Confucian and Buddhist thought. After he baptized his first Japanese converts in 1868, word reached the Pure Land Buddhist follower Takusaburō. Because Father Nikolai's new spiritual ideals assimilated traditional conservative beliefs, Russian Orthodoxy became increasingly popular among the "ruined samurai" class which included Takusaburō.

It is unclear whether or not Takusaburō was baptized. According to historian Daikichi Irokawa, the name Takusaburō does not appear under the seminary's baptismal records. However, researchers Richard Devine and Otis Cary state that Takusaburō left for Tokyo to study directly under Father Nikolai, and was baptized as Peter Chiba in 1872. When returning to Sendai, the newly Peter Chiba (Takusaburō) was arrested because of his religious preaching and disputes with the Buddhists and Shintoists in his community. After completing his hundred-day prison sentence, Takusaburō returned to Father Nikolai's seminary in Ochanomizu, Tokyo.

In 1872, the Japanese government confronted Father Nikolai, with accusations that Father Nikolai disparaged the Meiji Emperor in his sermons. In response, Father Nikolai's beliefs stressed the submission to the Emperor and state authority as true faithfulness to God. Consequently, Takusaburō grew increasingly detached to Father Nikolai's mission.

== Spiritual crisis ==
In 1875, Takusaburō left Father Nikolai to study under Confucian scholar Yasui Sokken of the Ichigaya Academy. This move marked a radical change in Takusaburō's beliefs. While drawing ideas from the kokugaku ideology, Sokken was ultimately unorthodox in his beliefs. Unlike the teachings of Father Nikolai, Sokken was notorious for his denunciation of Christian intellectuals in early Meiji Japan, most notably in his controversial text Benmō meaning vindication. Christian missionaries viewed Sokken's heretical beliefs as the work of the Anti-Christ himself. Takusaburō first entered the Academy several years after Sokken's most accomplished disciple had passed. Executed by the Meiji government in 1870, Kumoi Tatsuo was only twenty six years old when he planned an insurrection to reestablish feudal rule. Just before his execution, Kumoi wrote a poem of resistance against the authoritarian forces, lauded by other activists as "a compelling image of resolute revolutionary resistance". Kumoi's poem would later inspire and rouse the interests of the Freedom and People's Rights Movement supporters, which would include Takusaburō.

After Yasui Sokken's death ten months after Takusaburō's admission, Takusaburō left to study under French Catholic priest Father François Paulin Vigroux, a member of the Paris Foreign Missions Society who had traveled to Japan in 1873. Coined as a "walking priest", Vigroux traveled a Catholic circuit through Japan's major cities every month. While Takusaburō accompanied Vigroux on these tours, Takusaburō first became acquainted with the residents of Itsukaichi, where he would eventually end his years of wandering.

== Learning and Debating Society ==
In August 1877, Takusaburō met with missionary Reverend Maclay. A member of the Methodist Episcopal Church, Maclay was sent to Japan three years earlier amidst the wave of Methodist mission stations already established in Nagasaki, Hakodate and Shinshū among other major cities. It is believed that this step towards Methodism eventually paved the path to Takusaburō's leap into liberal activism. After many years on his spiritual quest for truth, Takusaburō found a home in Itsukaichi, where the plans for the Freedom and People's Rights movement were already unraveling.

In 1872, regulations in Japan set a mandate extending universal elementary schooling to all classes, dismantling upper class monopolization of education access. Inspired by the American model of education, Japan hoped that education would produce "free and independent individuals". Under this provision, the Kannō School was opened as an elementary school in Itsukaichi in 1876, headed by Naganuma Orinojō. After hearing of the many Sendai men already appointed, Takusaburō joined the school in 1880.

Imagined reconstruction of the Itsukaichi Kannō School

By 1880, Itsukaichi became the center of activity for metropolitan intellectuals "on the crest" of the Freedom and People's Rights movement. The new Learning and Debating Society became the ground for local activists to improve debating and oratory skills and increase the level of political discussion. An active member of the group, Takusaburō soon grasped the essence of the natural rights theory. That same year, Takusaburō began privately lashing out against the Meiji government who "deprived" the Japanese of their "most precious freedoms". Though the new government had seemingly maintained order behind their reformist policies, Takusaburō believed that unbeknownst to the Japanese, it came at an enormous cost of "our brothers' blood, sweat, and toil".

More importantly, Takusaburō asserted the necessity of a national assembly and constitution, previously promised by the Emperor Meiji himself. In response to the widespread petitions calling for the establishment of a constitution, the Council of State declared that the Japanese citizens possess no rights. Furthermore, the Japanese citizens were faced with more suppression of free speech through the newly instated Newspaper and Assembly Laws. In response, Takusaburō believed that in order to preserve liberty, freedom and happiness, the Learning and Debating Society must take this immense responsibility on their own hands.

== Draft constitution ==
After his ten years of wandering, Takusaburō had finally found happiness in Itsukaichi. In a letter to his companion and fellow teacher at the Kannō School in December 1880, Fukasawa Naomaru, Takusaburō shared the communal nature of the Learning and Debate Society.

The members of this study group have firmly resolved to devote themselves to furthering freedom and to reforming society. Sharing an inflexible determination to overcome all obstacles, we are united by a spirit of affection, esteem, and harmony. It is almost as if we were of the same flesh and blood, or brothers in one large family.

In that same month, Takusaburō was approached by a regional Freedom and People's Rights meeting known as the Musashi Friendship Society or Bushū konshin kai convening the directors of the organization. A month later, Takusaburō received a copy of the Ōmei Society draft constitution, which guided his own ideas. In his research, Takusaburō came across collections of John Stuart Mill's Considerations on Representative Government, A. Chambers' A Constitutional History of England, Francis Lieber's On Civil Liberty and Self-Government, and Bernhard Windscheid's Introduction to German Civil Law among many others. Using these texts, Takusaburō hoped to adopt European and American ideas to model a democratic future for Japan as well. During his meetings at the 'Learning and Debating Society,' Takusaburō relentlessly worked out the fine details of the articles which delegated the rights of the people, and the powers that would be left to the national assembly.

While Takusaburō's initial draft lacked legal sophistication and continuity, his constitution remained unique from both the Ōmei Society's and Western models. Takusaburō's 1881 constitution envisioned a two house legislature, with a nonelected upper house. However, this upper house reversed the criteria for membership placing the speaker of the elected house in first position, which the royal family and aristocracy in the last position. Takusaburō's constitution also clearly stated that any convicted person will not be subject to capital punishment, and that the terms "guilty" or "innocence" must be determined through a trial by jury.

In the early 1880s, segregation of educational systems from political thought emerged. As the Ministry of Education made repeated attempts to separate education and politics, Itagaki Taisuke as well as other leaders of the People's Rights Movement stressed the inseparability of the two realms. A series of ordinances and guidelines were passed by the Japanese government in 1880, which defined the moral character— patriotism and reverence for the Emperor— that should be embodied in all schoolteachers. Local schoolteachers resisted by forming organizational assemblies to lobby high-level political authorities on educational policy. Though by no means independent, these assemblies were a voice for the people to communicate views and exert influence.

On 6 July 1881, an edict passed by the Kanagawa prefectural governor prohibited elementary school teachers from personally engaging in any political activity. Takusaburō resigned his position at the Kannō Elementary School in response to this edict which coincided with disputes with the school principal Naganuma, and left for Sayama. Later that year, Nagunuma resigned from his position after nine years at the Kannō School.

October 1881 marked a major crisis within the oligarchy of the Meiji government as the Freedom and People's Right movement was simultaneously reaching the pinnacle of their success. In 1882, the mayor of Itsukaichi, Baba Kanzaemon, and the Kannō School overseers Fukasawa Gompachi and Uchino Shōbei joined the Liberal Party, or Jiyūtō established by Itagaki Taisuke. This administration allowed Takusaburō to return to Itsukaichi and become principal of the Kannō School in Nagunuma's absence. Under Takusaburō's administration, most teachers assigned by the prefectural government were dismissed. With the support of Mayor Baba Kanzaemon, Takusaburō was essentially given free rein over the Kannō School. After Takusaburō's death in 1883, his successor lashed out, claiming Takusaburō had turned the school into a bastion of the Freedom and People's Right Movement.

During his time at Sayama, Takusaburō received his first copies of the newly founded Liberal Party pledge and membership list. It is debated whether Takusaburō joined the Liberal Party. Daikichi Irokawa states that Takusaburō stamped his seal on both documents, indicating that he joined the Liberal Party. However, Richard Devine states that while many members of the Learning and Debating Society enlisted in the Liberal Party, Takusaburō himself never joined. Devine attributes this to possible adherence of the edict passed by the Kanagawa government, or Takusaburō's deteriorating health at the time.

== Legacy ==
In June 1882, Takusaburō left for Kusatsu hot springs for sixty days to recover from his illness. In his last will and testament to his close friend Fukazawa Gonpachi, Takusaburō expressed concern for the future activists. Takusaburō warned Gonpachi against those who "do not stick to principles but just follow a leader and not a principle ... [and to also] take initiative in siding with justice, set the agenda for discussion topics, and lead the followers away from error". Months later, Takusaburō wrote the Treatise on the Kingly Way, a guide to administer the "Kingly Way" or the "Great Way of Governance". In his text, Takusaburō emphasizes that while people's rights and freedom must be protected, limits on their power must also be exercised—likewise, restraints must also be placed on the Imperial rule. By keeping both these forces into balance, the society can exist in "Great Harmony".

In 1882, there was a public dispute regarding to whom national sovereignty should lie. While royalists called for unlimited imperial rule, extreme activists believed that people's rights should be extended if necessary by armed force and resistance. In contrast, the Treatise on the Kingly Way opposed both sides of the political spectrum. Takusaburō argued that by unifying the limited rights of both the people and the imperial force in a freely accepted contract, it will serve as a model for an ideal society. Though seemingly primitive compared to modern texts, the Treatise on the Kingly Way advanced over most theoretical works of Takusaburō's time.

Chiba's manuscript copy of Treatise on the Kingly Way or Ōdōron, 1882

In the summer of 1883, Takusaburō wrote one of his last essays entitled On the Futility of Book Learning. In his text, Takusaburō stated that: "Even the tumult of a crowd or the bustle of the marketplace can be the laboratory in which man attains wisdom." Using his own experiences as a guide, Takusaburō emphasized the world as a great book of learning, where real knowledge could only be attained by reading everyday life and searching for the truth.

Chiba Takusaburō died on 12 November 1883 at the age of thirty one from tuberculosis. Several years earlier, Takusaburō had once described himself as "Mr. Takusaburō Chiba, Distinguished Professor of Japanese Law, resident of Freedom Prefecture, Independence District, Righteous Spirit Village". However, as his sickness coincided along with the collapse of his vision of a liberal and free Japan, Takusaburō expressed great sorrow for the pain of his people. In one of his last poems, Takusaburō wrote:

Mountain barrier in snow and river rain//

Ten years of search, with all gone wrong,//

Half a life spent traveling in vain, a dream reflected in a window,//

The cuckoo from the grove, calls//

"Better retreat than continue on."

Western philosophers such as John Stuart Mills aroused "the spirit of enterprise" among the public with doctrines on the natural and inherent rights of man. Political protest was essential to the independent spirit. As freedom propagandist Ueki Emori argued in 1879, "[Nature] endows men with freedom. If people do not take this natural endowment, it is both a great sin against nature and a great disgrace to themselves." Chiba Takusaburō, along with powerful figures such as Itagaki Taisuke, is emblematic of the "grass roots" philosophy. Chiba's vision of a free Japan deconstructed the traditions of the lower class, and became the driving force of the Freedom and People's Rights Movement.
