= Kenichi Itō =

Kenichi Itō (いとう けんいち, Itō Kenichi) may refer to:

- Kenichi Ito (athlete), Japanese athlete known for running 100 meters on all four limbs
- Kenichi Itō (political scientist) (1938–2022), Japanese political scientist and diplomat
- Kenichi Ito, guitarist in the band Iceman

== See also ==
- Itō (name)
