= Freedom and People's Rights Movement =

Political movement in Meiji Japan

The Freedom and People's Rights Movement (Japanese: 自由民権運動, romanized: Jiyū Minken Undō) was a Japanese political and social movement for democracy during the Meiji period. It pursued the formation of an elected legislature, revision of the unequal treaties with the United States and European countries, the institution of civil rights, and the reduction of centralized taxation. The movement prompted the Meiji government to establish a constitution in 1889 and a diet in 1890; on the other hand, it failed to bring the government under parliamentary control, and its authority was ultimately repressed by the Meiji oligarchy.

The movement began with the 1874 submission of the Tosa Memorial, a petition calling for a representative assembly, by a group of former government councillors including Itagaki Taisuke, Gotō Shōjirō, and Etō Shimpei. It quickly gained momentum, evolving from local political societies of disaffected samurai into a nationwide movement that drew support from rural landlords, wealthy peasants, and liberal intellectuals. The government responded with a mix of concessions, such as the Osaka Conference of 1875 and the establishment of prefectural assemblies, and repression, including the passage of restrictive laws on the press and public assembly.

The Political Crisis of 1881 led to the issuance of an Imperial Rescript promising a national assembly by 1890, which marked a major success for the movement and spurred the formation of Japan's first political parties: the Jiyūtō led by Itagaki and the Rikken Kaishintō led by Ōkuma Shigenobu. However, the severe economic depression of the early 1880s, caused by the government's deflationary policies under Matsukata Masayoshi, led to internal divisions and radicalization within the movement. A series of peasant uprisings, known as the gekka jiken (激化事件, 'intensification incidents'), alienated the movement's landowning leadership. Combined with intensified government suppression, this led to the dissolution of the Jiyūtō in 1884 and the decline of the movement as a cohesive national force.

Despite its ultimate failure to establish a party-based government, the Freedom and People's Rights Movement had a profound and lasting impact on the political development of modern Japan. It was directly responsible for the adoption of the Meiji Constitution and the establishment of the Imperial Diet, and it embedded the concepts of popular sovereignty and civil rights in the Japanese political discourse.

== Origins ==
=== Post-Restoration discontent and Seikanron debate ===
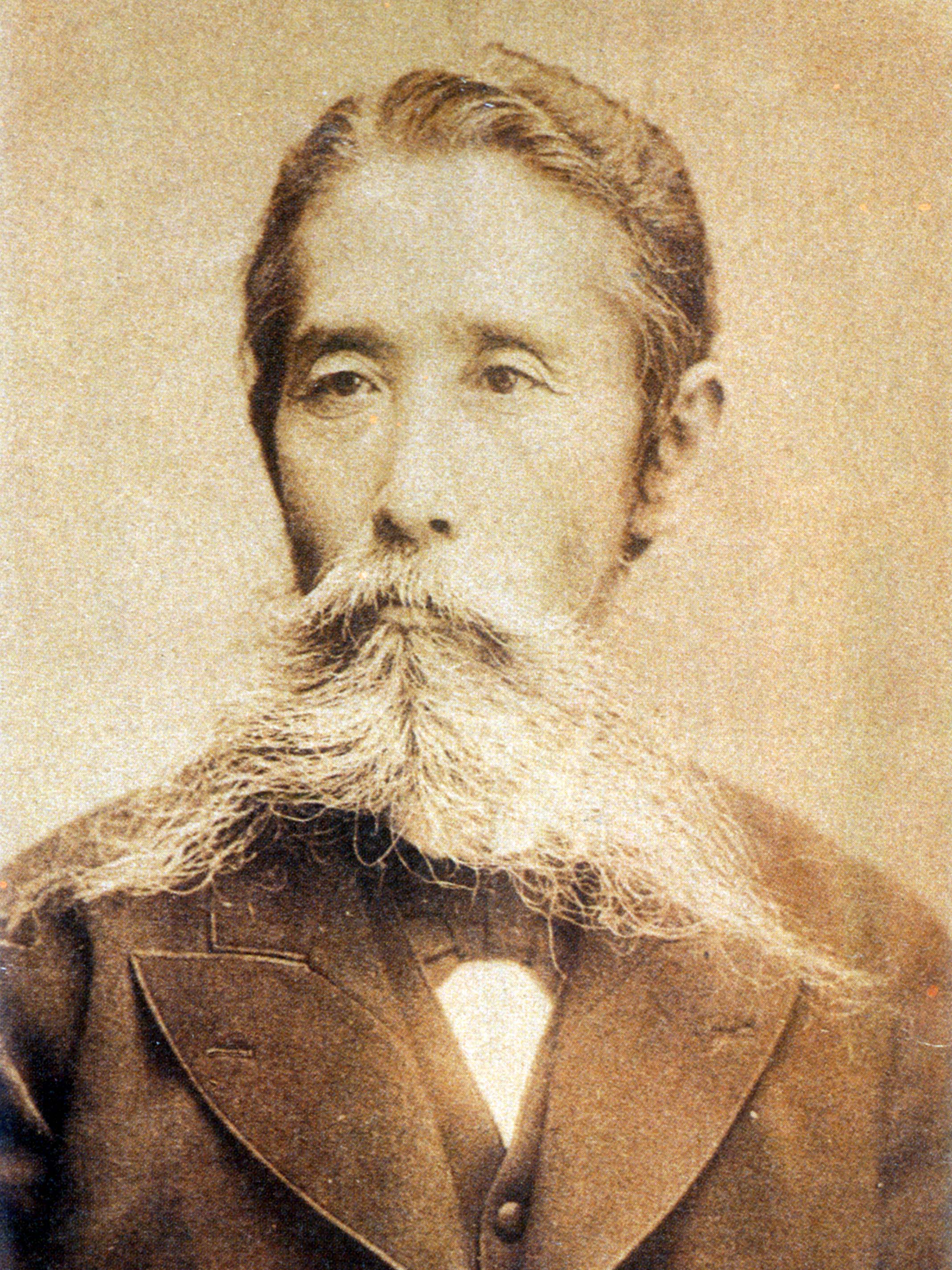
Itagaki Taisuke

The origins of the movement can be traced to the discontent among the samurai class following the Meiji Restoration of 1868. The samurai, who had been the ruling class under the Tokugawa shogunate, lost their hereditary stipends and social privileges, causing widespread economic distress and a loss of status. Many former samurai sought an outlet for their frustrations in a more aggressive foreign policy. A proposal for a military expedition to Korea, a debate known as the Seikanron, gained significant support among this group and their leaders within the government, including Saigō Takamori and Itagaki Taisuke.

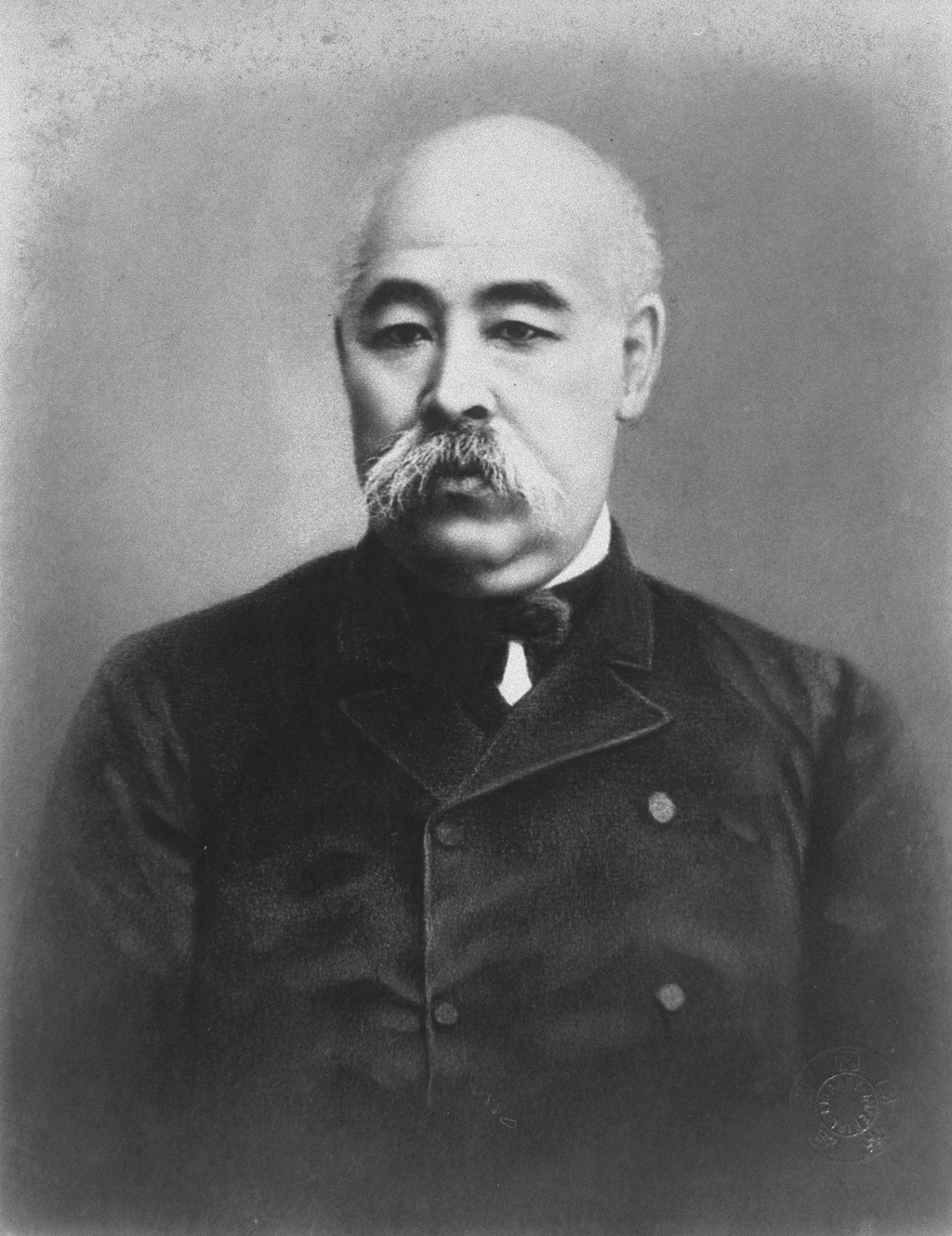
Gotō Shōjirō

The proposal was strongly opposed by key oligarchs such as Ōkubo Toshimichi and Iwakura Tomomi, who had just returned from the Iwakura Mission and argued that Japan should focus on internal modernization rather than foreign military adventures. In October 1873, the "peace party" prevailed, and the plan to invade Korea was rejected. In protest, Itagaki, Saigō, Etō Shimpei, Gotō Shōjirō, and other pro-war councillors resigned from their government posts. While Saigō returned to his home domain of Satsuma and would later lead the armed Satsuma Rebellion, Itagaki chose to challenge the government through political, rather than military, means. He declared, "Saigō fights the government with arms, but we will fight it with people's rights (minken)." His group came together to issue a manifesto calling for the establishment of representative government. This decision to organize a political opposition marked the beginning of what would become the Freedom and People's Rights Movement.

=== Tosa Memorial ===
On 17 January 1874, Itagaki, together with Gotō, Etō, and six other associates, submitted a memorial to the government calling for the establishment of an elected national assembly. The document, known as the Tosa Memorial, was a skillfully crafted critique of the Meiji oligarchy's monopoly on power. It stated that "the governing power lies not with the Crown... nor with the people... but with the officials alone," and accused the government of arbitrary rule. The memorial argued that to strengthen the nation and promote the people's welfare, a "council-chamber chosen by the people" should be established, allowing for open discussion of public affairs. It further contended that such an assembly would create a sense of national unity, thereby making Japan strong enough to resist foreign encroachment, and argued that as a "latecomer" to modernity, Japan could learn from the experience of Western nations and leapfrog over a period of experimentation to quickly establish a constitutional government.

The memorial was a direct challenge to the oligarchs' authority. While the government initially dismissed it as the work of disgruntled former officials, its publication in the press sparked a nationwide debate on representative government, popular rights, and constitutionalism. Although the memorial's authors were criticized for initially proposing that voting rights be limited to samurai and wealthy peasants, the underlying democratic implications of their arguments were widely recognized. Itagaki's own commitment to the cause was long-standing; he had endeavoured to persuade his colleague Kido Takayoshi of the merits of a representative assembly as early as 1871. The Tosa Memorial is considered the foundational document of the Freedom and People's Rights Movement.

== Early development (1874–1880) ==
=== Formation of political societies ===
Five days before submitting the memorial, Itagaki's group formed Japan's first political society, the Aikokukōtō (Public Patriotic Party), in Tokyo. However, its main leaders soon decided that a national party was not yet practicable and returned to their home domains to build local organizations. In Tosa, Itagaki founded the Risshisha (Self-Help Society) in April 1874. The society's name was inspired by the 1870 translation of Samuel Smiles's Self-Help, a book that became immensely popular in Meiji Japan as a guide to personal and national success through struggle and determination. Although it initially focused on providing economic relief and employment for the local disaffected samurai, the Risshisha quickly evolved into a political organization dedicated to promoting popular rights and agitating for a national assembly. The Risshisha served as a model for similar societies that sprang up across the country, such as the Jijosha (Self-Aid Society) in neighboring Tokushima.

In 1875, Itagaki took a leading role in federating these local groups into a national organization called the Aikokusha (Patriotic Society), with the aim of coordinating the petition movement on a nationwide scale. This first attempt at a national organization was short-lived, collapsing due to financial difficulties and Itagaki's own temporary return to the government following the Osaka Conference of 1875. However, the Aikokusha was successfully revived in September 1878, after the failure of the Satsuma Rebellion had demonstrated the futility of armed opposition to the government. Some of Itagaki's Tosa followers had even plotted to support Saigō's rebellion, but police uncovered the plan before it could be carried out. The movement's base had also broadened significantly, with numerous societies of wealthy peasants and rural samurai forming, particularly in eastern Japan. By its second convention in November 1880, commoners made up 53% of the delegates, having become the largest element in the movement. At its fourth national convention in March 1880, the Aikokusha renamed itself the League for the Establishment of a National Assembly (国会期成同盟, Kokkai Kisei Dōmei). Over the next year, the League and its affiliated societies coordinated a massive petition drive, gathering over 250,000 signatures from thirty-nine prefectures calling for a national assembly.

=== Government response ===
The Meiji government's response to the growing movement was twofold: a combination of concessions and repression. On the one hand, the oligarchs attempted to co-opt the movement's leaders. The Osaka Conference of 1875 resulted in Itagaki's brief return to the government and the establishment of new institutions intended to give the appearance of a move toward constitutional government, such as the Genrōin (Chamber of Elders) and the Assembly of Prefectural Governors. In 1878, the government also established elected prefectural assemblies (Fu-Ken Kai), which, although their powers were limited to advising the prefectural governors, provided an important training ground for future parliamentarians and served as a means to integrate wealthy peasants into the governmental system.

On the other hand, the government also moved to suppress the movement through repressive legislation. Press and libel laws were enacted in 1875 to curb criticism of the government. The Regulations for Public Meetings and Associations of April 1880 imposed strict controls on political gatherings, subjecting them to police sanction, denying membership to teachers and students, and prohibiting associations from combining or communicating with each other.

== Formation of political parties and decline ==
=== Political Crisis of 1881 and the Imperial Rescript ===
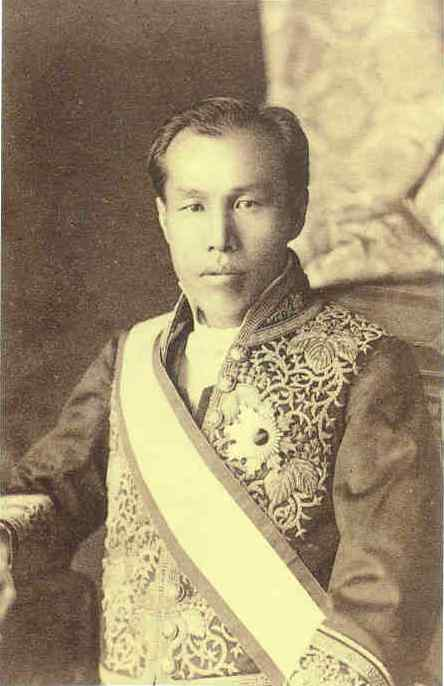
Ōkuma Shigenobu

The movement reached a turning point in 1881. A political crisis erupted over two major issues: constitutional reform and the sale of government assets in Hokkaido. On the constitutional question, Ōkuma Shigenobu, a leading figure in the government, submitted a memorial advocating for the immediate establishment of a British-style parliamentary system with a cabinet responsible to the legislature. His proposal was seen as too radical by his colleagues, particularly Itō Hirobumi, who suspected Ōkuma was making a bid for popular support to gain a pre-eminent position in the future government. At the same time, a public scandal erupted over the government's plan to sell the assets of the Hokkaido Colonisation Commission to a group of politically connected merchants at a fraction of their value. The ensuing public outcry, orchestrated in part by Ōkuma's allies, was seized upon by Itō and other oligarchs as a pretext to purge Ōkuma from the government.

The crisis, however, coupled with the continued pressure from the democratic movement, compelled the government to make a major concession. On 12 October 1881, the government issued an Imperial Rescript promising the establishment of a national assembly in 1890 and simultaneously cancelled the controversial sale of Hokkaido assets. This was a significant victory for the movement, as it committed the government to a clear timeline for the creation of a constitutional government.

=== Formation of the Jiyūtō and Kaishintō ===
The promise of a national assembly spurred the movement's leaders to form political parties to contest the upcoming elections. In October 1881, Itagaki and his followers transformed the Kokkai Kisei Dōmei into the Jiyūtō. The Jiyūtō drew its ideological inspiration from French political thought, particularly the writings of Jean-Jacques Rousseau, whose The Social Contract was translated by the party's leading intellectual, Nakae Chōmin. The party drew its main support from rural landowners.

In March 1882, Ōkuma Shigenobu founded a rival party, the Rikken Kaishintō (Constitutional Progressive Party). The Kaishintō was more moderate, advocating for a British-style constitutional monarchy, and drew its support from the urban intellectual and business elite, including Fukuzawa Yukichi's Keiō academy and the Mitsubishi zaibatsu. The rivalry between these two parties, exacerbated by personal and ideological differences, was often intense. Party affiliation was often determined less by ideology than by local rivalries, with prominent figures from competing districts (gun) aligning with opposing national parties. At a joint dinner meeting, a drunken argument between Numa Morikazu of the Kaishintō and Hoshi Tōru of the Jiyūtō escalated into a brawl in which Hoshi's entourage beat Numa with brass candlesticks, an incident that was stopped only by the arrival of the police. This antagonism often prevented a united front against the government.

=== Matsukata Deflation and radicalization ===
The early 1880s were marked by a severe economic depression caused by the deflationary policies of Finance Minister Matsukata Masayoshi. The "Matsukata Deflation" led to a sharp drop in rice and silk prices and widespread rural distress, bankrupting many of the small landowners and tenant farmers who formed the backbone of the Jiyūtō's support and increasing the rate of tenancy to over 40% in some areas.

Economic hardship led to the radicalization of the movement. A series of peasant uprisings, known as the gekka jiken (intensification incidents), erupted across the country, most notably the Chichibu Incident of 1884. These revolts, which often involved demands for debt relief and violent attacks on landlords and government offices, alienated the landowning leadership of the Jiyūtō and provided the government with a pretext for intensified repression. In what historian Marius Jansen calls a "Tokugawa-style uprising that was dealt with in non-Tokugawa ways," thousands of rebels in Chichibu were suppressed by the army; the ringleaders were executed, and over 4,000 others were convicted of crimes.

=== Decline and dissolution ===
Faced with growing government suppression, internal divisions between its moderate leadership and radicalized base, and the loss of financial support due to the depression, the Jiyūtō leadership decided to dissolve the party on 29 October 1884. This decision was hastened by a government bribery scandal: Itagaki's trip to Europe in 1882 was revealed to have been funded by the government through the Mitsui zaibatsu, a revelation that led many to question his commitment to the cause. The Kaishintō also suffered from internal strife and the resignation of Ōkuma, effectively losing its national influence. The dissolution of the major parties marked the decline of the Freedom and People's Rights Movement as a cohesive and organized national force, though political debate and local activism continued.

== Legacy ==
The Freedom and People's Rights Movement is a pivotal chapter in the history of modern Japan. Although it failed to achieve its immediate goal of establishing a government responsible to an elected legislature, its impact was profound and enduring.

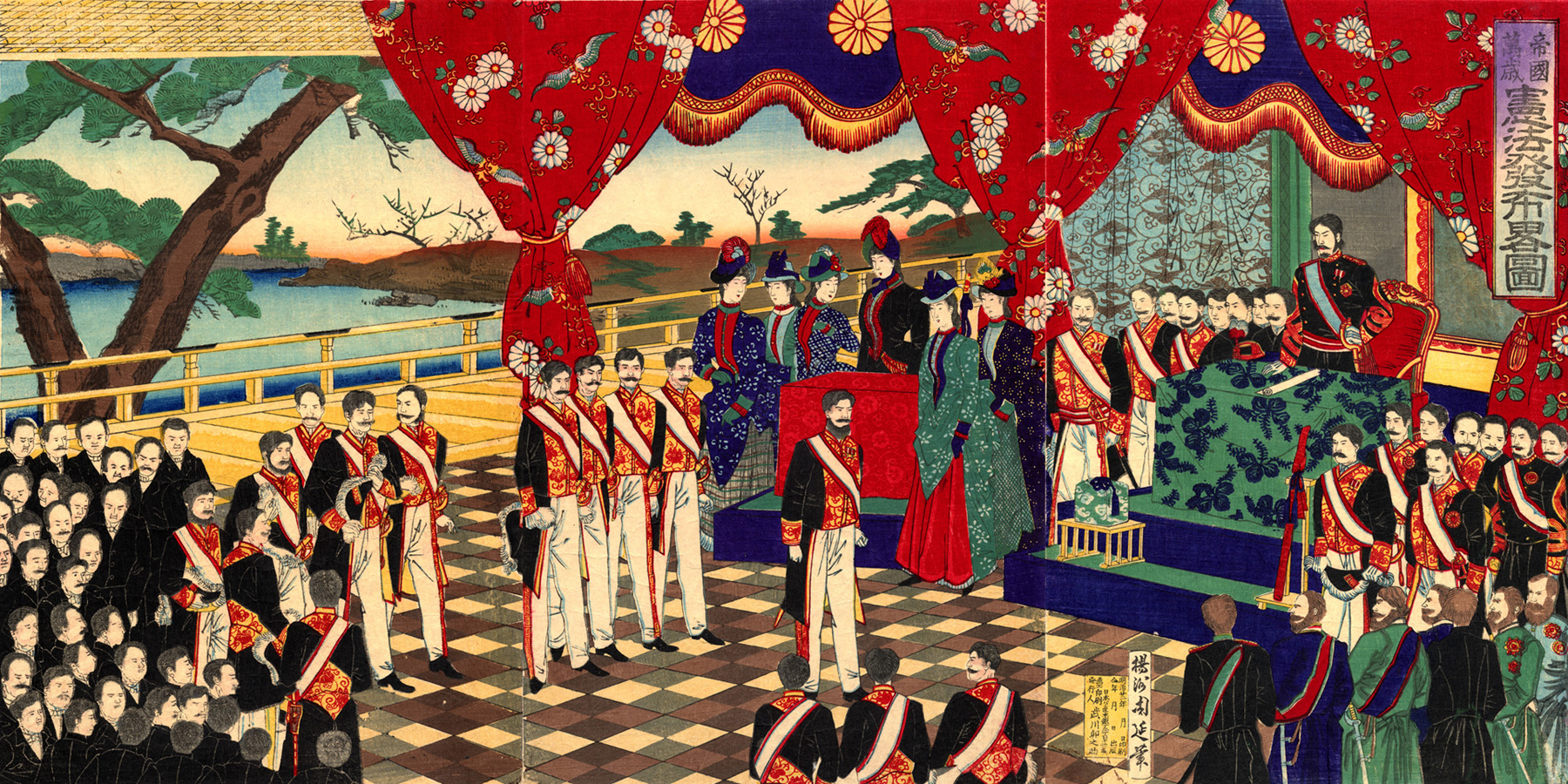
Depiction of the promulgation of the Meiji Constitution in 1889

The movement's most significant achievement was to force the Meiji oligarchy to enact a written constitution and establish a national assembly. The promulgation of the Meiji Constitution in 1889 and the convening of the first Imperial Diet in 1890 were direct consequences of the political pressure exerted by the movement. While the constitution was a conservative document that preserved the emperor's sovereignty and the oligarchy's power, it also established a legal framework for political participation and enshrined certain civil rights, providing what Itagaki and his followers saw as an "entering wedge" into the domain of public power.

The movement also laid the foundations for Japan's modern party system. The Jiyūtō and Kaishintō were the country's first modern political parties, and despite their short-lived existence in the 1880s, they established a tradition of political opposition and parliamentary politics that would continue throughout the pre-war period. The experience gained in organizing political societies, drafting petitions, and contesting elections created a generation of politicians who were skilled in the arts of parliamentary maneuvering.

Furthermore, the movement was instrumental in introducing and popularizing Western political concepts such as liberty, equality, popular sovereignty, and natural rights in Japan. Through the translation of works by thinkers like John Stuart Mill, Jean-Jacques Rousseau, and Herbert Spencer, and through the tireless agitation of its leaders and intellectuals, the movement sparked widespread public debate on the principles of government. The discovery of a draft constitution written in 1881 in a storehouse in the remote village of Itsukaichi demonstrated that this "search for new governmental forms" had spread far beyond the disaffected samurai elite and involved a broad spectrum of "commoners" with deep ties to rural communities. The movement embedded these ideas into the Japanese political discourse, where they would continue to influence political thought and action for decades to come.

== Related people ==
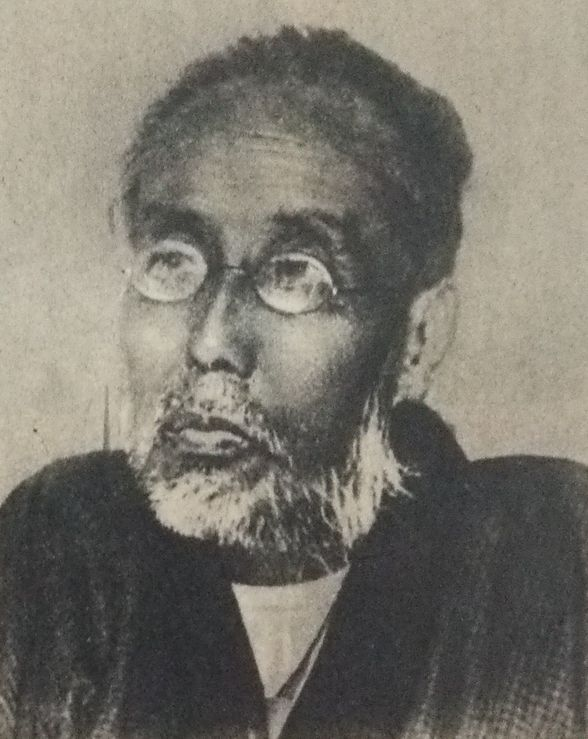
Nakae Chōmin

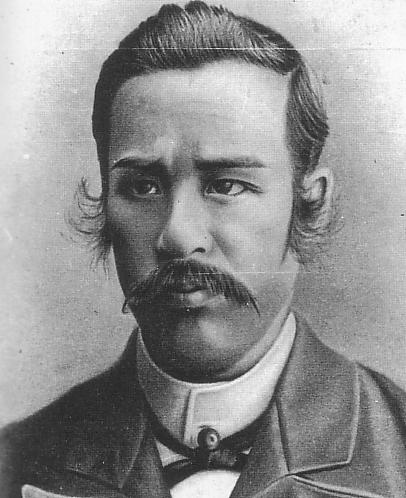
Ueki Emori

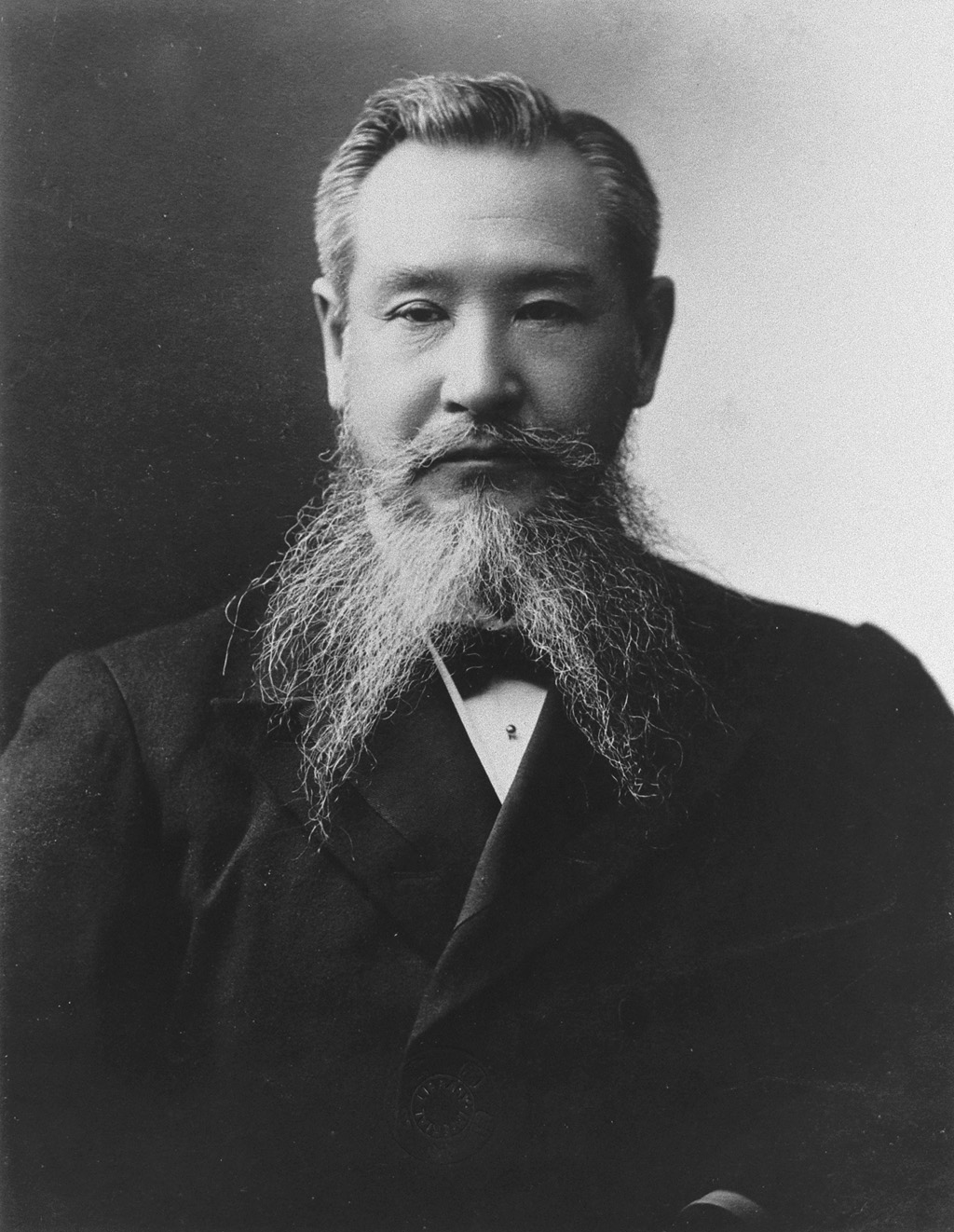
Kōno Hironaka

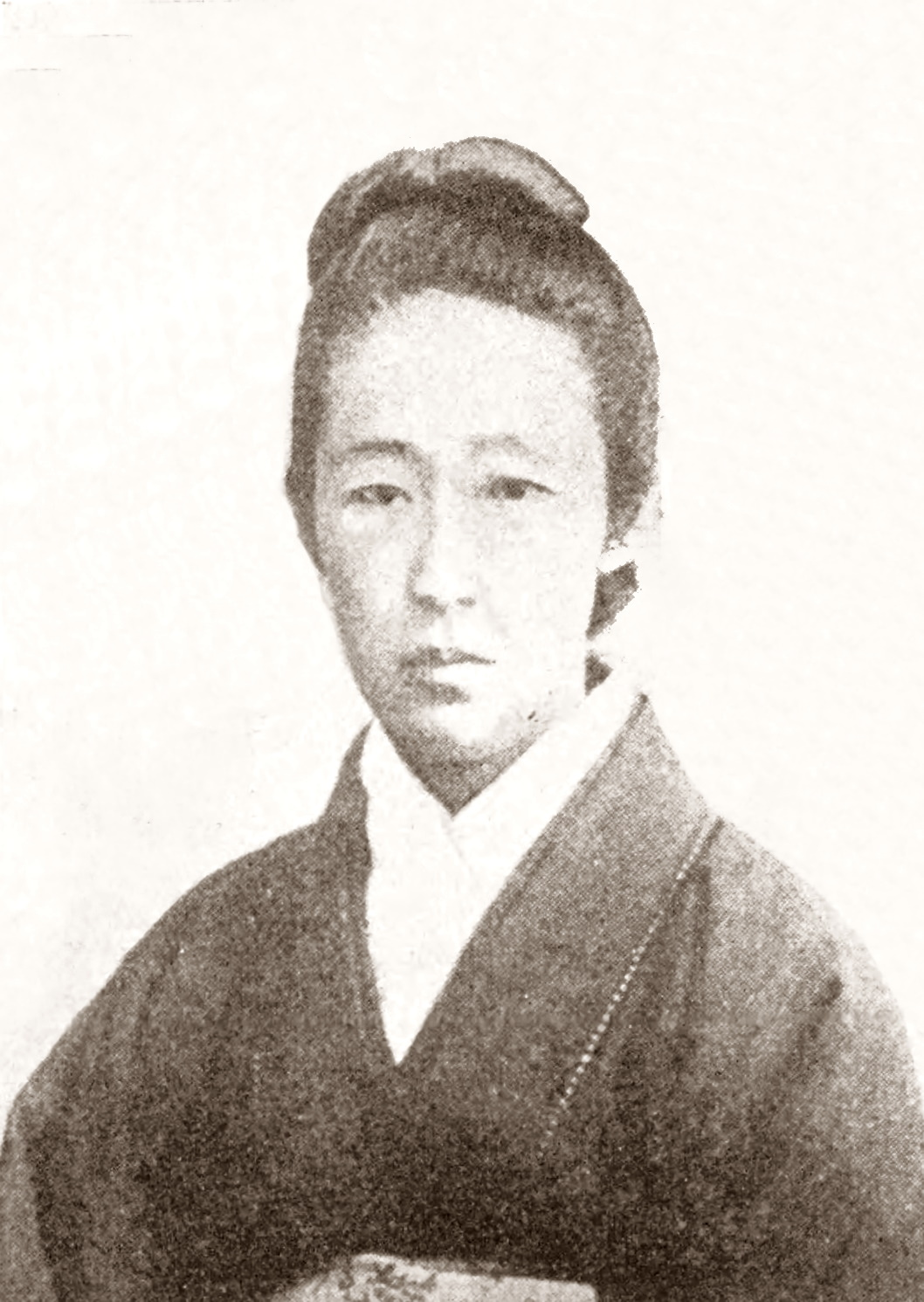
Toshiko Kishida

- Chiba Takusaburō, author of the "Itsukaichi constitution" (五日市憲法), a draft constitution for the Empire of Japan
- Etō Shinpei
- Fukuda Hideko
- Gotō Shōjirō
- Ido Reizan
- Inoue Kaoru
- Itagaki Taisuke, founder of the first Jiyūtō, and former leader of the Jinshotai assault force
- Kōno Hironaka
- Nakae Chōmin
- Saionji Kinmochi, one of the last Meiji period democrats, who later tried to prevent the Tripartite Pact
- Shimizu Shikin
- Soeda Azenbō, prolific enka lyricist and street performer
- Soejima Taneomi
- Tokutomi Sohō
- Toshiko Kishida
- Ueki Emori
- Yamaji Motoharu, former Jinshotai commander
- Yamamoto Yae
- Ōkuma Shigenobu

== See also ==
- Liberalism in Japan
- Japanese dissidence during the Shōwa period
- Taisho Democracy
- General Election Law - the law which granted all males aged 25 and over suffrage, enacted in 1925.
