= Mody Maor =

Israeli basketball coach (born 1985)

Mody Maor מודי מאור
Dallas Mavericks
- Position: Assistant coach
- League: NBA

Personal information
- Born: June 27, 1985 (age 41) Los Angeles, California, U.S.

Career information
- Coaching career: 2012–present

Career history

Coaching
- 2012–2014: Hapoel Holon (assistant)
- 2014–2016: Maccabi Ashdod (assistant)
- 2016–2017: Hapoel Jerusalem (assistant)
- 2017–2018: Hapoel Jerusalem
- 2019–2022: New Zealand Breakers (assistant)
- 2022–2024: New Zealand Breakers
- 2024–2026: Nagasaki Velca
- 2026–present: Dallas Mavericks (assistant)

Career highlights
- As assistant coach: Israeli League champion (2017)

Mody Maor (Hebrew: מודי מאור; born June 27, 1985) is an American-Israeli basketball coach currently working as an assistant for the Dallas Mavericks of the National Basketball Association (NBA). He was previously the head coach of the Nagasaki Velca in the Japanese B.League from 2024 until 2026.

== Early life ==
Maor was born in Los Angeles and moved to Israel when he was eight. He began his national service at the age of 18. He joined the Special Forces and was an officer for the final three years of his five-year term in the military. He embarked on a career as a professional basketball coach in 2012.

== Coaching career ==
In 2019, Maor joined the New Zealand Breakers of the Australian National Basketball League as an assistant coach under Dan Shamir. In 2022, he was elevated to head coach of the Breakers. He guided the Breakers to the 2022–23 NBL grand final series, where they lost 3–2 to the Sydney Kings. On May 23, 2024, he left the Breakers to pursue a coaching opportunity in Asia. Maor was hired in Japan to become the head coach of Nagasaki Velca in the B.League on a two-year deal. On May 10, 2026, it was announced that Maor was hired by head coach Dusty May and the University of Michigan to serve as an assistant coach for the defending national champion Wolverines.

Maor was hired by the Dallas Mavericks on 9 July 2026, as an assistant coach.

== Personal life ==
Maor has two daughters, both of whom were born in New Zealand.
