= Akira Itō (painter) =

Japanese painter

- 伊藤 彬
- Born: 1940 (age 85–86); Nishinomiya City, Hyogo Prefecture, Japan
- Education: Tokyo University of the Arts
- Known for: Painting

Akira Itō (伊藤 彬, Itō Akira; born 1940, in Nishinomiya, Hyōgo Prefecture, Japan) is a Japanese post-war and contemporary Nihonga painter.

Itō graduated from the Tokyo University of the Arts, Department of Japanese Painting in 1963. His work has been noted since graduation and he has become a member of important art groups (the Japanese Painting Department of the New Production Association, the Creative Society) in Japan of that time. The Nerima Art Museum wrote:

The following year, 1964, he won the New Writer Award at the New Production Association Exhibition. Furthermore, he received the New Writer Award for the third consecutive year from 1969, and in 1972 he became a member of the Japanese Painting Department of the New Production Association. In 1974, he withdrew from the New Production Association and participated in the formation of the Creative Society as a member. In 1975, he was recommended and exhibited at the Yamatane Museum of Art Award Exhibition. After that, he has been recommended and exhibited at the exhibition in 1977 and 1979. In 1984, he formed the Japanese painting research group 'Yoko no Kai', which was a collection of talented artists beyond the walls of his organization, and was active until 1993. From his fantastic style including romantic painting, he gradually develops into a profound and mysterious style based on the ink painting. Formed the group 'Eyes' in 1996.

Itō creates monochrome paintings using sumi and charcoal, and "says that he was influenced by the French painter Odilon Redon, especially the beauty of black in his prints".

A list of Itō's awards includes the First prize at the 6th Contemporary Japanese Art Exhibition in Ginhodo Gallery (1965), the 2nd Kanagawa Prefectural Art Exhibition Prefectural Assembly Chairman's Award (1967), the New Writer Award at the 34th New Production Association Exhibition (1970), the 6th Kanagawa Art Exhibition Grand Prize, 3rd Yamatane Museum of Art Award Exhibition (1975) and others

Works by Itō have been included in a number of public collections including the Terada Collection of the Tokyo Opera City Art Gallery in Tokyo Opera City Tower, and those of the Yokohama Museum of Art, the Nerima Art Museum, the Hiratsuka Museum of Art, the Museum of Modern Art, Kamakura & Hayama, and the Kanagawa Prefectural Museum of Modern Art.

In 1998, Akira Itoh was appointed as a mentor to a Japanese government postgraduate scholarship.
