= Takuma Ito =

Takuma Ito may refer to:

- Takuma Ito (basketball) (born 1982), Japanese basketball coach
- Takuma Ito (footballer) (born 1986), Japanese footballer
