= Toshiko Kishida =

Japanese feminist (1863–1901)

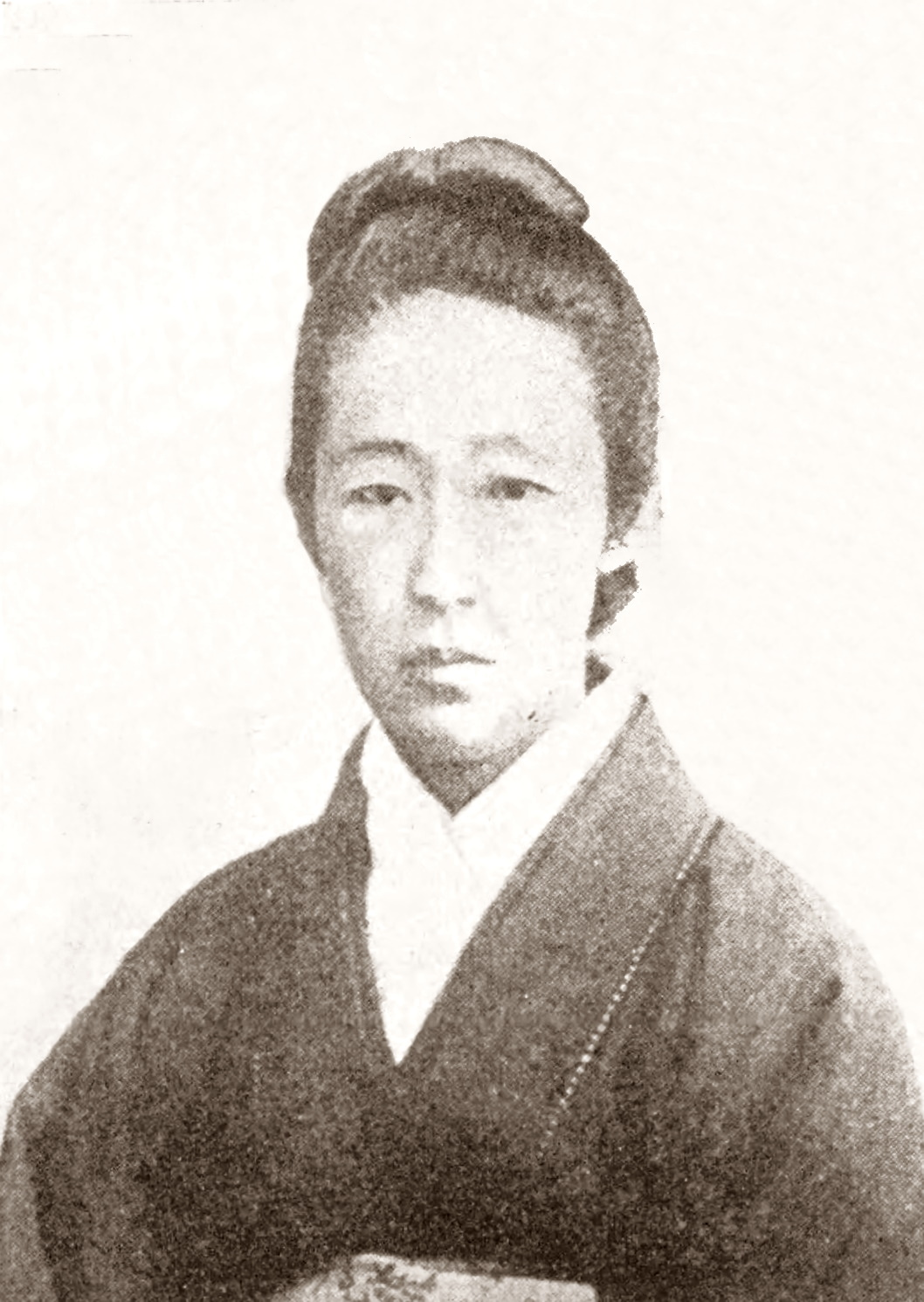
Toshiko Kishida

Toshiko Kishida (岸田 俊子, Kishida Toshiko; 14 January 1863 – 25 May 1901), afterwards Toshiko Nakajima (中島 俊子, Nakajima Toshiko), was one of the first Japanese feminists. She wrote under the name Shōen (湘煙).

== Early life and education ==
Kishida Toshiko was born in Kyoto Prefecture, Japan, in 1863. Kishida grew up in a merchant class family. Her father was Kishida Mohei, a secondhand clothing dealer, and her mother his wife Taka. In an early biography by Sōma Kokkō, it is noted that business travels kept her father from home, strengthening the bond between mother and daughter, and thus instilling Kishida's passion to improve women's status and promote their financial and social independence from their husbands.

Kishida grew up during the Meiji-Taishō period, which lasted from 1868 through 1926. During this period Japanese leaders opened themselves up to new ideas and reformers called for "new rights and freedoms". The women of this reformist movement are now known as "Japan’s first wave feminists". Kishida was one of these feminists. The focus of her movement was to increase the status of young Japanese girls, particularly those of the middle and upper classes. This improvement "was essential if other technologically advanced nationals were to accept them". Reformers stressed that equality had to be given to all Japanese women. With the reforms that took place in Japan, Japanese women were given greater opportunities to gain new rights and freedoms. The women coined the term "good wife, wise mother" which meant that "in order to be a good citizen, women had to become educated and take part in public affairs".

== Career ==
After demonstrating her calligraphic talents for Imperial Prince Arisugawanomiya Taruhito in 1877, Kashida was identified as a suitable candidate for service in the Meiji Empress' court. Two years later she became the first woman of non-aristocratic birth to serve as monji goyō gakari (court attendant specializing in classical Chinese) in Empress Haruko's court. She worked at the imperial court as a tutor serving the Empress; however, she felt that the imperial court was "far from the real world" and was a "symbol of the concubine system which was an outrage to women". Kishida took up the reform movement full time and began speaking across Japan.

She left the court in 1882 to embark on a national lecture tour, sponsored by the Jiyūtō (Liberal Party). On this tour she also joined the Freedom and People's Rights Movement as a speaker, and traveled with the group to various rural areas, educating and presenting the group's critique of the Meiji government's practices and calling for greater participation and opportunities for social citizenship. Her importance to the movement was solidified in April 1882, when she gave a speech titled "The Way of Women" at the inauguration of the Osaka Provisional Political Speech Event.

She was noted daily in regional newspapers for her public speaking meetings, her speech titles including "The Government as the Force over Men, and Men as the Force over Women" (May 1882), 'Women Cannot But Combine 'the Rigid and the Supple' [gōjū]", and "To Endure What Need Not Be Endured, and to Worry about What Need Not Be a Concern: These Are Not The Duties of Women", reflecting her desire to address women's status in society. Kishida urged women to become educated, as a basis for the promotion of equal rights for women and men. "I hope in the future there will be some recognition of the fact that the first requirement for marriage is education," she wrote.

After her 1883 speech, "Daughters in Boxes" she was "arrested, tried, and fined for having made a political speech without a permit" which was necessary under Japanese law at the time. Kishida's arrest in Ōtsu, in part ended her career focus as a public speaker, however she continued to work for the Freedom and People's Rights Movements. Kishida increasingly became focused on speaking out against the inequality of Japanese women.

=== "Daughters in Boxes" Speech ===
Delivered on 12 October 1883, The "Daughters in Boxes" speech criticized the family system in Japan and the problems it raised for young Japanese girls. It acknowledged that the system was a cultural fixture, and that many parents did not understand the harm it could cause for daughters by restricting them. Kishida recognized that upper and middle class Japanese parents did not mean to restrict their daughters' freedom. Rather, they were blinded by a need to teach certain values in order to fit into Japanese culture and society.

In her speech, Kishida introduced the three "boxes" present in Japanese families. These boxes are not actual boxes but mental and emotional limitations. The boxes represented how Japanese daughters were locked into certain requirements. The first box is one in which parents hid their daughters physically. The girls were not allowed to leave their rooms, and any elements belonging to the outside world were blocked out. The second box concerned the obedience of Japanese daughters. In this box, "parents refuse to recognize their responsibility to their daughter, and teach her naught". These daughters receive no love or affection and are expected to "obey their [parent’s] every word without complaint". The final box presented by Kishida was the education of daughters, in which they were taught ancient knowledge. This final box was the one that Kishida valued the most. Because it valued "the teaching of the wise and holy men of the past", Kishida felt that its inclusion and focus on education empowered women.

Kishida also discussed her own version of a box. Her box would have no walls and be completely open and inspired by freedom. Kishida's box "[allowed] its occupants to tread wherever their feet might lead, and stretch their arms as wide as they wished". Unlike the other boxes Kishida described, her box without walls would allow Japanese daughters to be educated and become active members of society. The speech also suggested that the boxes created for Japanese daughters should not be created in haste. She explained that if a box was hastily constructed, the daughters would resent being placed in it and run away from such restrictions. "Daughters in Boxes" analyzed and critiqued Japanese society and its treatment of Japanese girls. The absence of women's rights in Japan sparked the feminist and reformist movement of which Kishida Toshiko was a major part. Kishida's speech challenged the cultural norms of Japanese society in general. The speech also cemented the place of women and women's movement in Japan's history.

== Later ==
In 1884 Kishida married Nakajima Nobuyuki, who worked as a political activist in the Liberal Party. On a business related trip to Italy with her husband, she contracted tuberculosis, after which Nobuyuki resigned from his post and the couple returned to Japan. The couple withdrew from active public life, but continued to remain involved in politics. Nobuyuki also contracted tuberculosis, and in their final years they lived in the town of Ōiso. Nobuyuki died in 1899, while Kishida survived until May 1901. An existing body of diaries covers periods of her life as well as published works of fiction, essays, and poetry in journals. Kishida, who later went by her writing pseudonym Shōen, took part in the public world of political activism, writing, and social commentary. She is distinguished as a popular female figure in literature and activism, pushing against male privileges in education, literary and press circles. Her writing further reveals her lived experiences as a woman in a changing sociopolitical Meiji society.
