= Tokyo Zokei University =

Private art university in Hachioji, Japan

Coordinates: 35.61524°N 139.33488°E

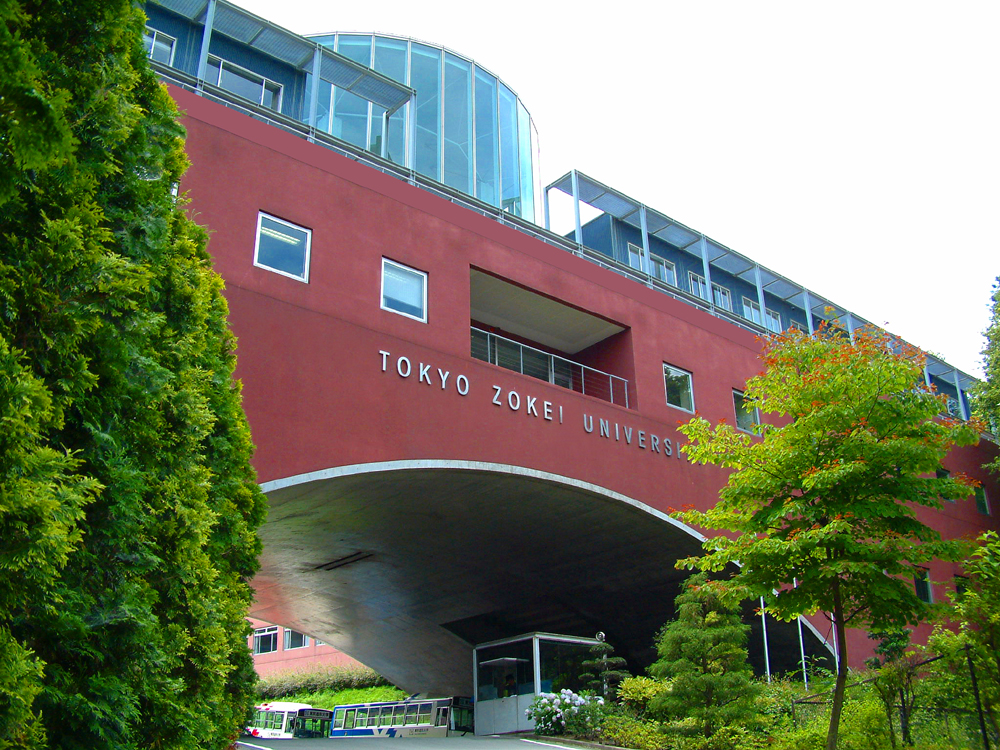
Tokyo Zokei University

Tokyo Zokei University (東京造形大学, Tōkyō zōkei daigaku) is a private university in Hachioji, Tokyo, Japan, founded in 1966 by Japanese art educator, fashion designer and design journalist, Yoko Kuwasawa (1910-1977). It is a four-year art college offering both bachelor's and master's degrees in studio arts. In 2016 a Doctoral (Ph.D.) program was established in Design Education and Research. The campus is situated in woodland within walking distance of Aihara Station on the JR Yokohama Line, but a university bus runs between station and campus.

== Departments and majors ==
The university consists of two schools, Design and Fine Arts. The School of Fine Arts offers bachelor's degree in two majors, Painting and Sculpture, while the School of Design offers bachelor's degree in Graphic Design, Photography, Film, Animation, Media Design, Interior Design, Industrial Design, Textile Design and Sustainable Project majors.

Master's degree is also offered in two research areas, Design and Fine Arts.

== International exchange ==
Tokyo Zokei University has been promoting more active education and research through international exchange programs with prestigious academic institutions abroad. Current partner universities/colleges are as follows:

- Accademia di Bella Arti di Carrara
- Konstfack University College of Arts Crafts and Design
- School of Photography, Goteborg University
- The Academy of Fine Arts in Vienna
- Royal Academy of Fine Arts, The Hague/KABK
- Willem de Kooning Academy of Hogeschool Rotterdam
- UWE Bristol, School of Art, Media and Design
- Winchester School of Art, University of Southampton
- Hochschule für Gestaltung, Schwäbisch Gmünd

== Faculty ==
- Yasuhiro Ishimoto, photographer
- Katsuhito Nakazato, photographer
- Nobuhiro Suwa, film director
- Yutaka Takanashi, photographer

== Alumni ==
- Kunio Ōkawara, anime designer
- Nobuhiro Suwa, film director
- Kōji Yamamura, animation director
- Hiroyuki Ito, video game director
- Reitaro Ito, sculptor and art professor
- Toshihiro Nagoshi, video game producer and designer
- Keiichiro Toyama, video game director

== DESIS Network ==
- TZU DESIS Lab
