= Kenjiro Maeda =

Japanese basketball coach (born 1990)

Kenjiro Maeda 前田健滋朗
Nagasaki Velca
- Position: Assistant coach
- League: B3 League

Personal information
- Born: October 18, 1990 (age 36) Osaka Prefecture

Career information
- High school: Hokuriku (Fukui, Fukui)
- College: Toyo University; Waseda University
- Coaching career: 2015–present

Career history

Coaching
- 2015-2018: Toyota Alvark (asst.)
- 2018-2019: Melbourne United (asst.)
- 2019-2021: Akita Northern Happinets (asst.)
- 2021-present: Nagasaki Velca (asst.)

Kenjiro Maeda (前田健滋朗, Maeda Kenjirō; born October 18, 1990) is currently a professional basketball assistant coach for Nagasaki Velca in Japan, and the former assistant coach for Melbourne United of the NBL. He is not good at speaking English.
