= Akira Ito =

Akira Ito or Itō may refer to:

- Akira Ito (footballer) (born 1972), Japanese footballer
- Akira Ito (field hockey) (born 1981), Japanese field hockey player
- Akira Itō (artist), Japanese manga artist
- Akira Itō (painter), Japanese painter
