= Ido Reizan =

Japanese journalist, writer, poet and liberal activist

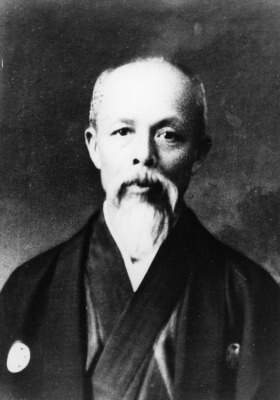
Portrait of Ido Reizan

Ido Reizan (井土 霊山; 1859–1935) was a Japanese journalist, writer, poet, and liberal activist. He was involved in the Freedom and People's Rights Movement, which appears to have forced him into a nomadic lifestyle.

== Biography ==
Reizan was born Wada Tsuneshige into a family of samurai in Sōma Nakamura han and later married into the Idos, who were an Azabu-stationed samurai family. His wife was Ido Sumi. His father Wada Yoshishige (和田 祥重) was a samurai-turned-farmer who wrote a handbook of farming (農業要録) (published in Tokyo in 1889).

Ido attended and graduated from the Sendai Teaching College, which in the Meiji period became the Faculty of Education of Tohoku University.

In a professional capacity, he worked as a journalist and an editor-in-chief at various newspapers including Osaka Mainichi Shimbun, Sanyo Shimbun, and Tokyo Yokohama Shimbun. Reizan was a prolific writer who wrote and edited 27 books, the subjects of which ranged from criminal law to Chinese poetry.

He had personal acquaintance with Gotō Shinpei with whom he toured Kyushu sometime between 1909 and 1916 (most likely in October 1910 when Goto visited Kyushu).

Ido advocated the establishment of the University of Manchuria, which he thought would be instrumental in introducing modernity to Manchuria and China. His proposition to provide people in Manchuria and China with higher education predates the establishment of the National Foundation University by 33 years.

== Sources ==
- Wakamatsu, Jotaro. 2002. Reizan - Ido Tsuneshige. Fukushima-Jiyujin, vol. 17. (Reprinted in The Proceedings of Fukushima Jiyu Minken Daigaku Soma Taikai. pp. 49–61.)
- 1992. Kyodo yukari no sakkatachi. Kyoiku Fukushima, vol. 0166. p. 48.
- Oshu-shi Goto Shinpei Kinenkan ed. 2009. DVD-ROM Goto Shinpei Shokanshu. Tokyo: Yushodo.
