= Nagasaki Velca =

Professional basketball team based in Nagasaki City, Nagasaki Prefecture

- Conference: West
- Division: Second
- Leagues: B1 League
- Founded: 2020; 6 years ago
- History: Nagasaki Velca (2020–present)
- Arena: HAPPINESS ARENA
- Capacity: 6,000
- Location: Nagasaki City, Nagasaki Prefecture
- Team colors: Prussian blue, white and dark yellow
- Main sponsor: Nishikawa
- CEO: Hideki Iwashita
- President: Hideki Iwashita
- Team manager: Takuma Ito
- Head coach: Dean Vickerman
- Ownership: Japanet
- Championships: 1 B.League (2026)
- Website: www.velca.jp
Home	Away

The Nagasaki Velca (長崎ヴェルカ, ながさきヴェルカ, Nagasaki Veruka) is a Japanese professional basketball team based in Nagasaki. The team competes in the B.League Premier, the highest division of the B.League, as a member of the Western Conference. The team plays its home games at Happiness Arena.

== Franchise history ==
=== Foundation ===
In 2020, Japanet announced the creation of Nagasaki Prefecture's first professional basketball club. The club was formally launched on July 10, and will compete in B3 or the third division of the B.League beginning the 2021–22 season. The company Nagasaki Velca Co., Ltd. (株式会社長崎ヴェルカ) was established with Hideki Iwashita (岩下 英樹) as the president and CEO, and Akito Takata (髙田 旭人) as the director. The company is responsible for the operation and promotion of the basketball club as well as the management of the athletes. The company headquarters is located in Manzaimachi, Nagasaki City, Nagasaki Prefecture.

On January 26, 2021, the team announced that Takumi Ito will serve as the head coach and general manager.

==== Naming the team ====
In July 2020, the management asked suggestions for the team name. On September 15, they revealed that the 2,324 entries were narrowed down to three prospects: Nagasaki Jabuzz (長崎ジャブズ), Nagasaki Haretto (長崎ハレット) and Nagasaki Velca (長崎ヴェルカ). To select the team name, online voting was done and voting events were also held in different parts of the Nagasaki Prefecture. On October 30, the club name Nagasaki Velca was unveiled. "Velca" is derived from the words "welcome," "well community" and "victory."

=== Promotion to B2 ===
The team finished their inaugural season with 42 wins and 3 losses, setting a B3 record with a .933 winning percentage. They were subsequently named B3 Champions and earned a promotion to B2 or the second division of the B.League. On May 17, 2022, the team announced that Takumi Ito will continue to serve as the general manager and Kenjiro Maeda, who was the team's associate head coach, will take over as the head coach beginning the 2022–23 season. On May 29, B.League announced that Nagasaki will compete in the West conference of B2.

== Uniform ==
=== Jersey sponsors ===
On April 29, 2021, the team announced that Nishikawa is the jersey sponsor beginning the 2021–22 season.

== Current roster ==
Note: Flags indicate national team eligibility at FIBA-sanctioned events. Players may hold other non-FIBA nationalities not displayed.

Nagasaki Velca roster
Players
Coaches

Pos.	No.	Nat.	Name	Ht.	Age
G	1	(Japan)	Kenji Leon Matsumoto	1.83 m (6 ft 0 in)	32 – 30 May 1994
G	2	(Japan)	Koya Kobari	1.72 m (5 ft 8 in)	27 – 18 May 1999
F	3	(South Korea)	Min Kug Chang	2.00 m (6 ft 7 in)	37 – 5 July 1989
G	4	(Japan)	Masaya Karimata	1.78 m (5 ft 10 in)	37 – 28 December 1988
F	5	(United States)	Matt Bonds	1.96 m (6 ft 5 in)	30 – 6 November 1995
F	7	(United States)	Jarrell Brantley	2.01 m (6 ft 7 in)	30 – 7 June 1996
F	9	(Japan)	Masaaki Morikawa	1.91 m (6 ft 3 in)	34 – 7 March 1992
F	11	(Japan)	Hirohide Araya	1.89 m (6 ft 2 in)	27 – 5 December 1998
G	14	(Japan)	Kanji Takahira (C)	1.83 m (6 ft 0 in)	32 – 14 September 1993
F/C	15	(Philippines)	A. J. Edu	2.08 m (6 ft 10 in)	26 – 1 January 2000
G/F	18	(Japan)	Yudai Baba	1.96 m (6 ft 5 in)	30 – 7 November 1995
F	23	(Japan)	Daisuke Noguchi	1.96 m (6 ft 5 in)	43 – 26 May 1983
F	33	(United States)	Nick Perkins	2.03 m (6 ft 8 in)	29 – 15 October 1996
G	36	(Japan)	Takuma Enokida	1.84 m (6 ft 0 in)	28 – 24 May 1998

Head coach

(Australia) Dean Vickerman

Assistant coach(es)

(Japan) Kenjiro Maeda
(Japan) Makoto Isono

Legend

- (C) Team captain
- Injured

- Roster
Updated: March 31, 2023

== Notable players ==
To appear in this section a player must have either:
- Set a club record or won an individual award as a professional player.
- Played at least one official international match for his senior national team.

- (Japan) Masaya Karimata
- (Panama) Javier Carter

== Head coaches ==
- (Japan) Takuma Ito: 2021–2022
- (Japan) Kenjiro Maeda: 2022–2024
- (United States) (Israel) Mody Maor: 2024–2026

== Management ==
=== Ownership ===
Ownership history
Owner	Tenure
Japanet	2020–present

=== General managers ===
GM history
GM	Tenure
Takuma Ito	2020–present

== Arenas ==
- HAPPINESS ARENA

== Practice facilities ==
The team opened a new practice facility, the Velca Clubhouse (ヴェルカクラブハウス), in Sasebo City, Nagasaki Prefecture on May 27, 2021.

== Fanbase ==
The fan club of the team is called Velcas Zero (ヴェルカーズ ゼロ).
