= Takuma Ito (basketball) =

Japanese basketball coach

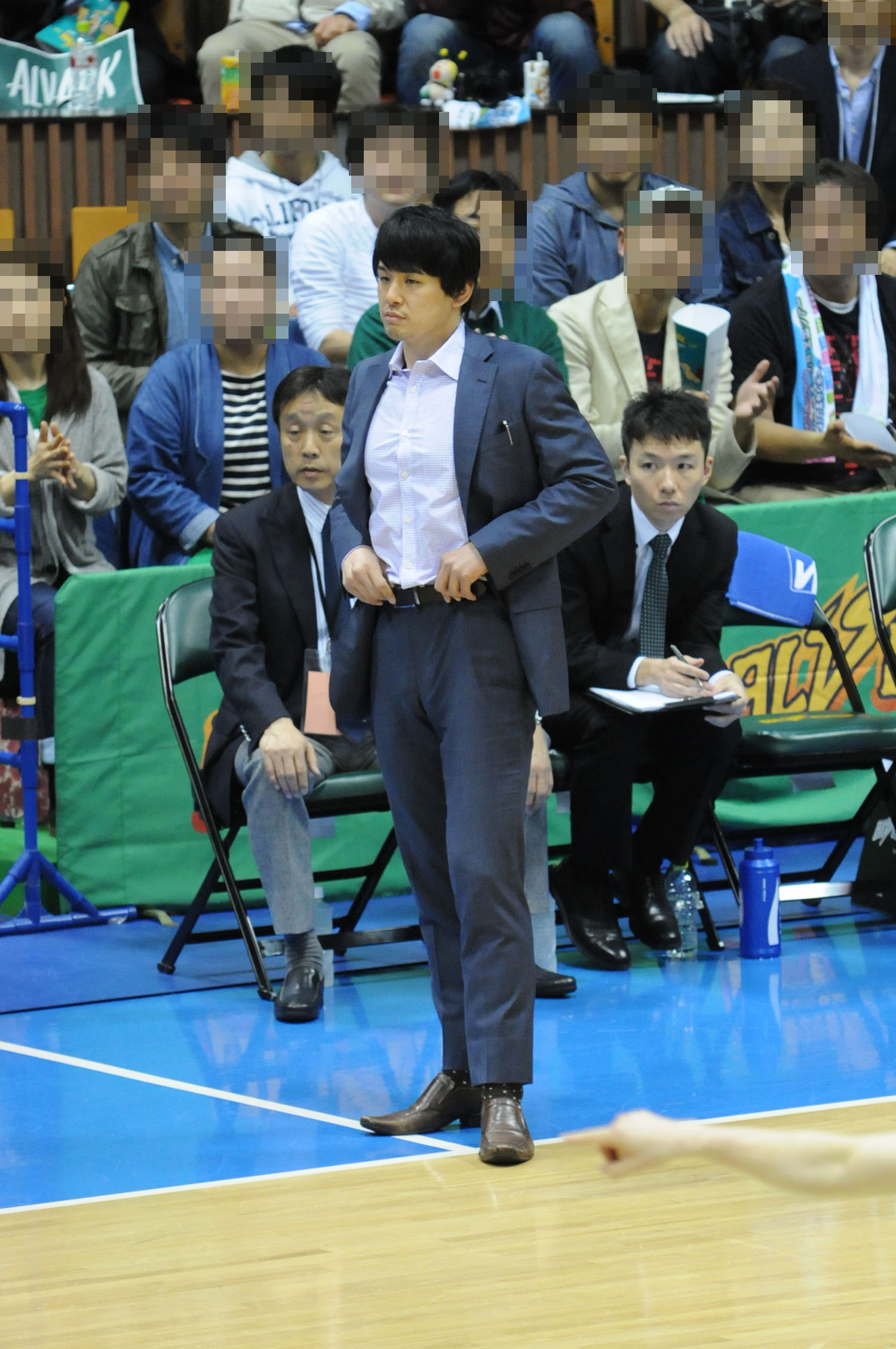
- Takuma Ito, 2016.

Nagasaki Velca
- Position: General manager
- League: B.League

Personal information
- Born: June 30, 1982 (age 44) Suzuka, Mie

Career information
- High school: Tualatin (Tualatin, Oregon); Montrose Christian (Rockville, Maryland)
- College: Virginia Commonwealth University

Career history

Coaching
- 2009-2015: Toyota Alvark (asst & associate)
- 2015-2017: Toyota Alvark
- 2021-2022: Nagasaki Velca

Takuma Ito (伊藤 拓摩, Itō Takuma) is the general manager of the Nagasaki Velca in the Japanese B.League. Ito is the former head coach of the Alvark Tokyo and the Nagasaki Velca.

== Head coaching record ==
Legend
Regular season	G	Games coached	W	Games won	L	Games lost	W–L %	Win–loss %
Playoffs	PG	Playoff games	PW	Playoff wins	PL	Playoff losses	PW–L %	Playoff win–loss %

Team	Year	G	W	L	W–L%	Finish	PG	PW	PL	PW–L%	Result
Toyota Alvark	2015-16	55	47	8	.855	1st	4	2	2	.500	3rd
Alvark Tokyo	2016-17	60	44	16	.733	2nd in Eastern	5	3	2	.600	Lost in 2nd round
