= Yoshiko Ito =

Japanese sport shooter (born 1962)

Yoshiko Ito (伊藤 佳子, Itō Yoshiko; born 22 August 1962) is a Japanese sport shooter who competed in the 1988 Summer Olympics. She placed 12th in the Sport pistol 25 meters event.
