= Kazuyuki Itō =

Japanese astronomer

Minor planets discovered: 1
6879 Hyogo	October 14, 1994	MPC

Kazuyuki Itō (伊藤和幸, Itō Kazuyuki) is a Japanese astronomer.

In 1994, he discovered 6879 Hyogo at Sengamine Observatory, a 20-kilometer sized carbonaceous asteroid from the main belt. The body was named in honor of the Japanese Hyōgo Prefecture with its capital city of Kobe, where the Great Hanshin earthquake occurred on 17 January 1995. Naming citation was published on 3 May 1996 (M.P.C. 27130).
