= Minoru Ito =

Minoru Ito may refer to:

- Minoru Ito (ice hockey) (伊藤 実, born 1948), Japanese ice hockey player
- Minoru Ito (sport shooter) (伊藤 実, born 1941), Japanese sport shooter
- Minoru Itō (伊藤 実), a Japanese mangaka
- Minoru Ito, Japanese dermatologist who first described Incontinentia pigmenti achromians
