= Daisuke Itō =

Daisuke Itō may refer to:

- Daisuke Itō (racing driver) (born 1975), Japanese racing driver
- Daisuke Itō (film director) (1898–1981), Japanese film director
- Daisuke Ito (footballer) (born 1987), Japanese football player
- Daisuke Itō (producer), Japanese producer, see Absolute Boy
