= Sayako Ito =

Japanese free announcer

- 伊東 紗冶子
- Born: 15 January 1994 (age 32); Osaka Prefecture, Japan
- Education: Kindai University Faculty of Literature
- Occupation: Announcer
- Years active: 2016–2018
- Agent: Cent Force
- Height: 166 cm (5 ft 5 in)
- Website: Sayako Ito

External videos
- Ekichō Osusume Gourmet "Eki Oshi!" JR Nara-eki (30 June 2014)
- Ekichō Osusume Gourmet "Eki Oshi!" JR Himeji-eki (4 August 2014)
- Ekichō Osusume Gourmet "Eki Oshi!" JR Shin Osaka-eki (1 September 2014)
- Ekichō Osusume Gourmet "Eki Oshi!" JR Tokyo-eki & Tokyo Disneyland (22 September 2014)
- Ekichō Osusume Gourmet "Eki Oshi!" JR Tokyo Bookmark (6 October 2014)

Sayako Ito (伊東 紗冶子, Itō Sayako; born 15 January 1994) is a former Japanese free announcer and tarento. She was represented with Cent Force.

== Biography ==
Ito was born in Osaka Prefecture as the second of three daughters. Her hobbies are walking dogs, watching films and yoga, and her skill is swimming in which her body is soft.

Ito majored in Japanese literature at Kinki University Faculty of Letters and Arts. In 2013 at the same university, she was selected as Miss Kinki University 2013, and participated in the Miss Campus Queen Contest (entry No. 2). Ito was also chosen at the semi-Grand Prix. In 2014 she also appeared on the Sankei Sports gourmet project Ekichō Osusume Gourmet "Eki Oshi!"

After graduating from the university in July 2016, Ito launched full-fledged activities as a tarento first stage student belonging to a newly launched regional base "Cent Force Kansai" from Cent Force. In August that year, she decorated the cover and top gravure with Weekly Playboy's issue 36. Ito is currently living in Osaka while conducting tarento activities.

== Programme appearances ==
Title	Network
Higawari Cent Force (Channel Nama kaiten TV All Zap!)	BS Sky PerfecTV!
gee up sprout	FM Salus
The Hit Studio	MBS Radio

== Magazine ==
Title	Issue	Publisher
Weekly Playboy	2016 36th	Shueisha
Weekly Young Jump	2017 8th	Shueisha
