= Masanori Ito =

Masanori Ito may refer to:

- Masanori Ito (journalist) (1889–1962), Japanese journalist, author and military commentator
- Masanori Ito (music critic) (born 1953), Japanese music critic and radio personality, known as Seisoku Ito
