= Tomohiko Ito =

Tomohiko Ito may refer to:

- Tomohiko Ito (footballer) (born 1978), Japanese footballer
- Tomohiko Itō (director) (born 1978), Japanese anime director
