= Yoshihiko Itō =

Japanese photographer

Yoshihiko Itō (伊藤 義彦, Itō Yoshihiko; born 1951) is a Japanese photographer. He graduated from the Tokyo College of Photography in 1977.

== Exhibitions ==
In 1995, his work was included in the touring exhibition Photography and Beyond in Japan: Space, Time and Memory presented at the Hara Museum of Contemporary Art in Tokyo, the Museo Tamayo in Mexico City, the Los Angeles County Museum of Art, the Denver Art Museum, the Honolulu Museum of Art and the Vancouver Art Gallery.

== Collections ==
His works are included in the permanent collection of the National Museum of Modern Art, Tokyo, and the Center for Creative Photography at the University of Arizona.
