= Atsushi Ito =

Atsushi Ito may refer to:

- Atsushi Itō (actor) (伊藤 淳史, born 1983), Japanese actor
- Atsushi Ito (wrestler) (伊藤 敦, born 1964), Japanese sport wrestler
