= Reitaro Ito =

Reitaro Ito (伊藤 礼太郎, Itō Reitarō; 1925 – November 22, 2007) was a Japanese sculptor and art professor at Tokyo Zokei University. He was born in Ibaraki Prefecture and died of a brain tumor at a hospital in Chiba Prefecture.
