= Yoshihiro Ito =

Yoshihiro Ito may refer to:

- Yoshihiro Ito (baseball) (1982–2025), Japanese Nippon Professional Baseball player
- Yoshihiro Ito (racing driver) (born 1977), Japanese racing driver
