= Hiratsuka Museum of Art =

- 平塚市美術館
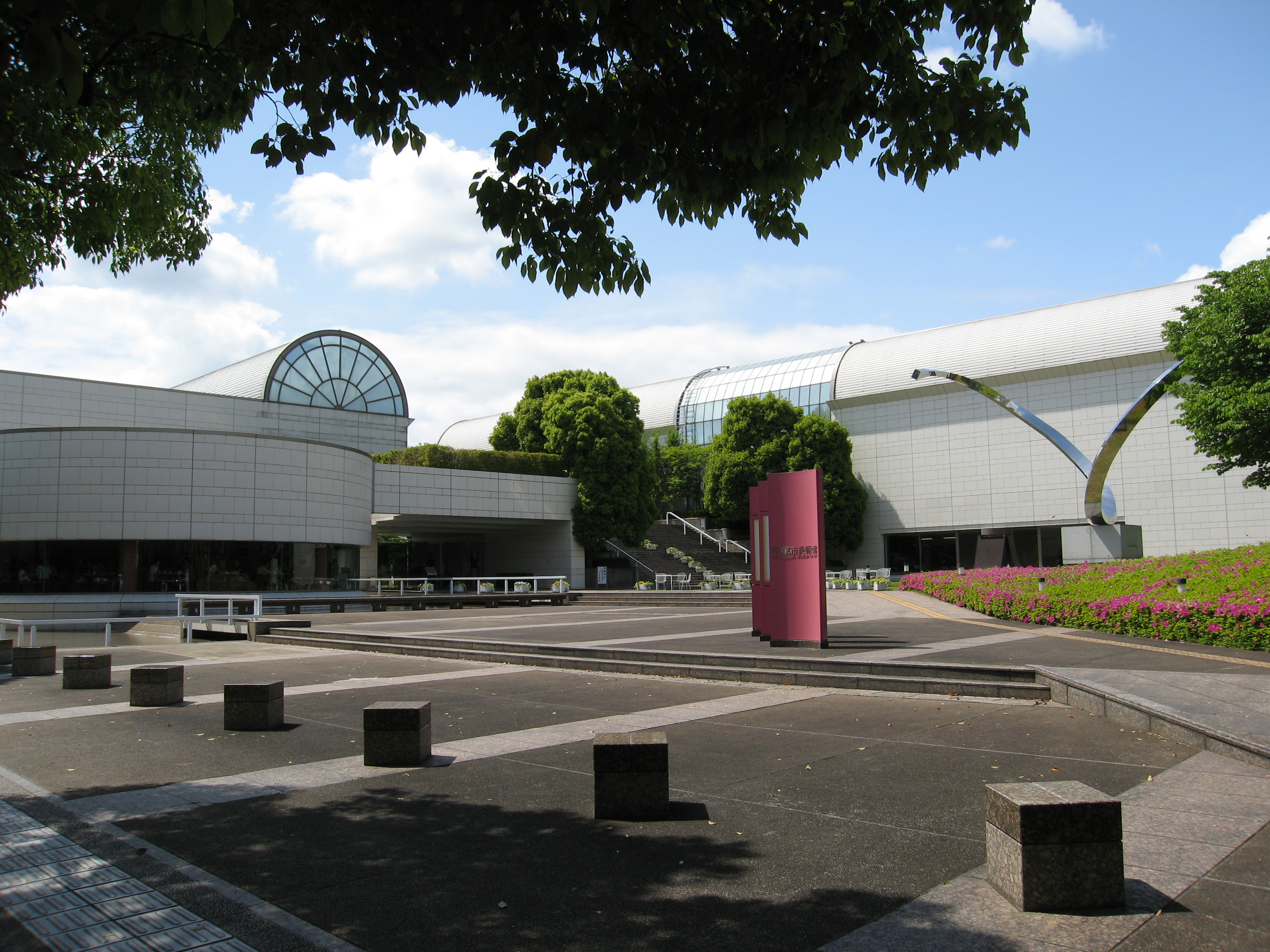

General information
- Location: 1-3-3 Nishiyawata, Hiratsuka, Kanagawa Prefecture, Japan
- Coordinates: 35°20′17″N 139°20′51″E
- Opened: March 1991

Website
- Official website

The Hiratsuka Museum of Art (平塚市美術館, Hiratsuka-shi bijutsukan) opened in 1991 in Hiratsuka, Kanagawa Prefecture, Japan. The collection of approximately twelve thousand objects has a particular focus on the Shōnan area.

== Vicinity ==
Located opposite is the Hiratsuka City Museum (平塚市博物館), which opened in 1976 and is concerned with the nature and culture of the Sagami River area.

== See also ==
- Museum of Modern Art, Kamakura & Hayama
- List of Cultural Properties of Japan - paintings (Kanagawa)
