= Itō Genboku =

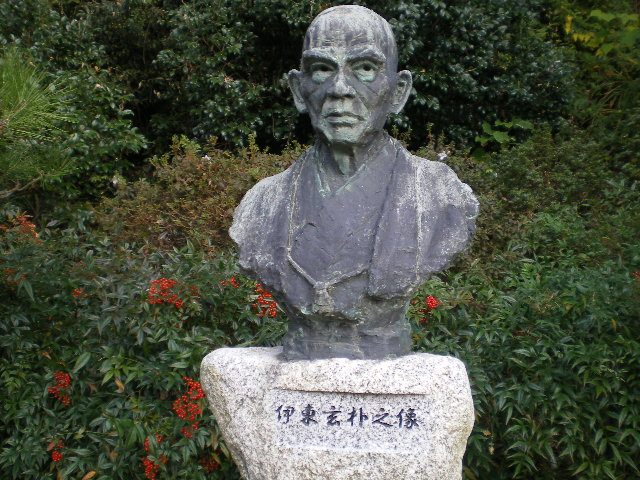
Itō Genboku

Itō Genboku (伊東 玄朴; 11 February 1801 – 2 January 1871) was a Japanese surgeon and Rangaku expert living during the late Edo period and early Meiji era. He was the first surgeon to give a cowpox vaccine in Japan, between 1858 and 1860.

Itō Genboku's offices were later expanded into the foundations of the incipient University of Tokyo Institute of Medical Science.

== In popular culture ==
Itō Genboku appears in the 2009–2011 TV series Jin. He was portrayed by actor Katsuya Kobayashi.
