= Einosuke Itō =

Japanese writer

Einosuke Itō (伊藤 永之介, Itō Einosuke; Akita, November 21, 1903 – July 26, 1959) was a Japanese writer.

== Life ==
After finishing his studies, he worked in a bank and started writing articles for several publications. In 1924, he moved to Tokyo, where he started to publish for the socialist journal Bungei Sensen (文芸戦線) founded by Yōbun Kaneko. Thanks to his 1928 publication Mienai Kōzan (見えない鉱山) in this journal, his works were considered part of the Proletarian literature movement.

== Works (sel.) ==
- 1930 Bōdō (暴動)
- 1930 Kyōkō (恐慌)
- 1937 Fukurō (梟)
- 1938 Uguisu (鶯)
- 1938 Karasu (鴉)
- 1939 Ushi (牛)
- 1939 Kuma (熊)
- 1939 Uma (馬)
- 1939 Sakka no techō (作家の手帖)
- 1939 Tsubame (燕)
- 1939 Gan (雁)
- 1939 Ishikawa Rikinosuke nōson kōsei no jufu (石川理紀之助 農村更生の慈父)
- 1940 Asaichi (朝市)
- 1941 Tokai to inaka (都会と田舎)
- 1941 Furusato no haru (故郷の春)
- 1942 Hirata Atsutane (平田篤胤)
- 1942 Isha no iru son (医者のゐる村)
- 1942 Kamo to funa (鴨と鮒)
- 1942 Roji no hitobito (路地の人々)
- 1943 Haru no wakare (春の別れ)
- 1944 Akita (秋田)
- 1946 Utsukushii tabi (美しい旅)
- 1947 Futatsu no seishun (二つの青春)
- 1947 Furusato no uta (故郷の歌)
- 1947 Umi no oni (海の鬼)
- 1948 Yama no kami (山の神)
- 1948 Nōmin no kōfuku (農民の幸福)
- 1952 Keisatsu nikki (警察日記)
- 1953 Bungaku nyūmon (文学入門)
- 1954 Natuskashii sanka (なつかしい山河)
- 1955 Keimusho shigan (刑務所志願)
- 1955 Shinkeisatsu nikki (新警察日記)
- 1955 Tanima no kyōdai 谷間の兄弟
- 1956 Yamazakura (山桜)
- 1957 Chūzaisho nikki (駐在所日記)
- 1957 Nambei kōro (南米航路)
- 1959 Shizen to jinsei ni tsuite no shijū hanashi (自然と人生についての四十話)
- 1959 Kieru mizuumi (消える湖)
- 1959 Santarō (三太郎)
- 1960 Shochō nikki (署長日記)

== Movies ==
- 1951 Keisatsu nikki (警察日記)
