= Deaths in April 1982 =

The following is a list of notable deaths in April 1982.

Entries for each day are listed alphabetically by surname. A typical entry lists information in the following sequence:

- Name, age, country of citizenship at birth, subsequent country of citizenship (if applicable), reason for notability, cause of death (if known), and reference.

== April 1982 ==
=== 1 ===
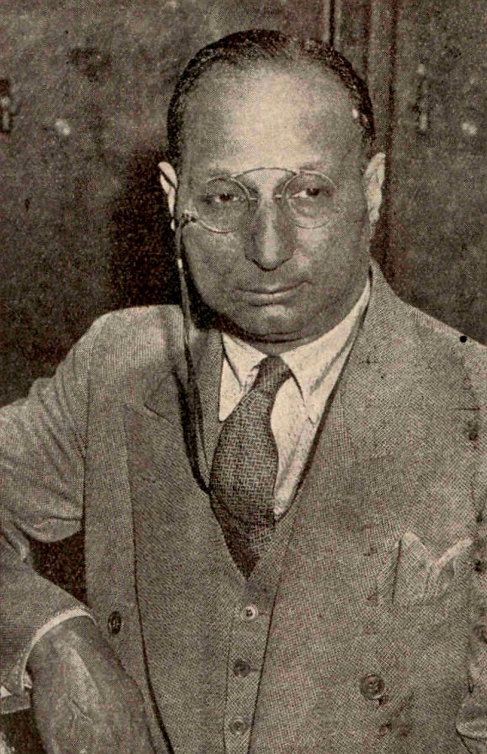
Gobind Behari Lal

- Stephen Chase, 79, American actor
- Col Cottrell, 40, British speedway rider
- Xu Fuguan, 78, Chinese historian and philosopher
- Gobind Behari Lal, 92, Indian-American journalist and independence activist. Winner of the Pulitzer Prize for Reporting in 1937.
- Harry F. Olson, 81, American acoustical engineer
- Hassam-ud-Din Rashidi, 70, Sindhi historian and scholar
- Ann Richards, 46, American pop and jazz singer

=== 2 ===
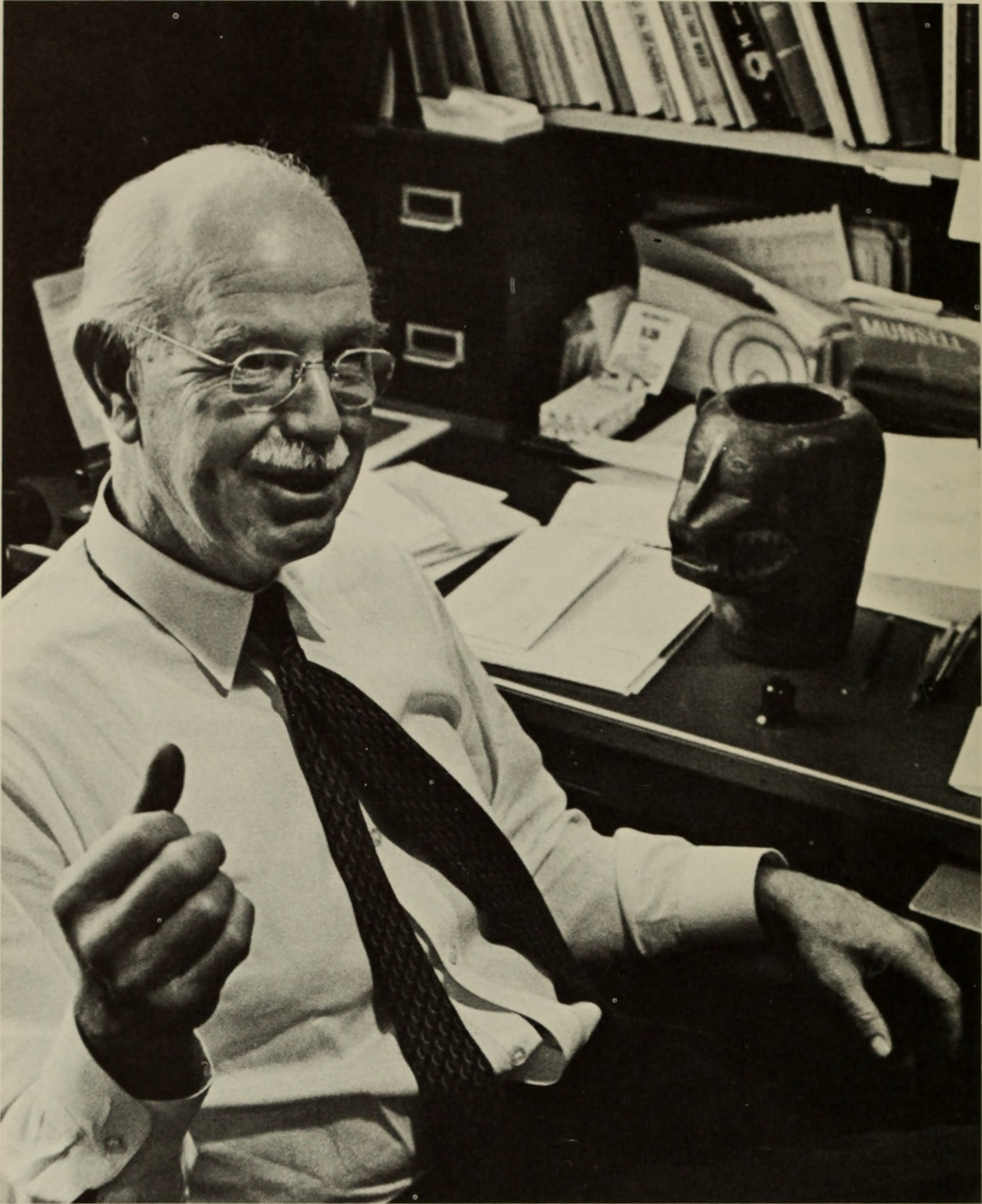
Junius Bird

- Yedidya Admon, 87, Israeli composer and singer
- Junius Bird, 74, American archaeologist and curator at the American Museum of Natural History
- Hannes de Boer, 81, Dutch long jumper
- Fritz Breidster, 81, American military officer and football player
- Sam Coslow, 79, American songwriter, singer, film producer, publisher, and market analyst, he won the Academy Award for Best Live Action Short Film for his production Heavenly Music, he founded the publishing company Investor's Press, which published investing books and the newsletter "Indicator Digest."
- Ruth Gikow, 67, American visual artist
- Loretta Hines Howard, 78, American artist and collector
- Éva Kun, 64, Hungarian fencer
- Murari Sharma, 81, Indian revolutionary
- Max de Vaucorbeil, 80, Belgian film director

=== 3 ===
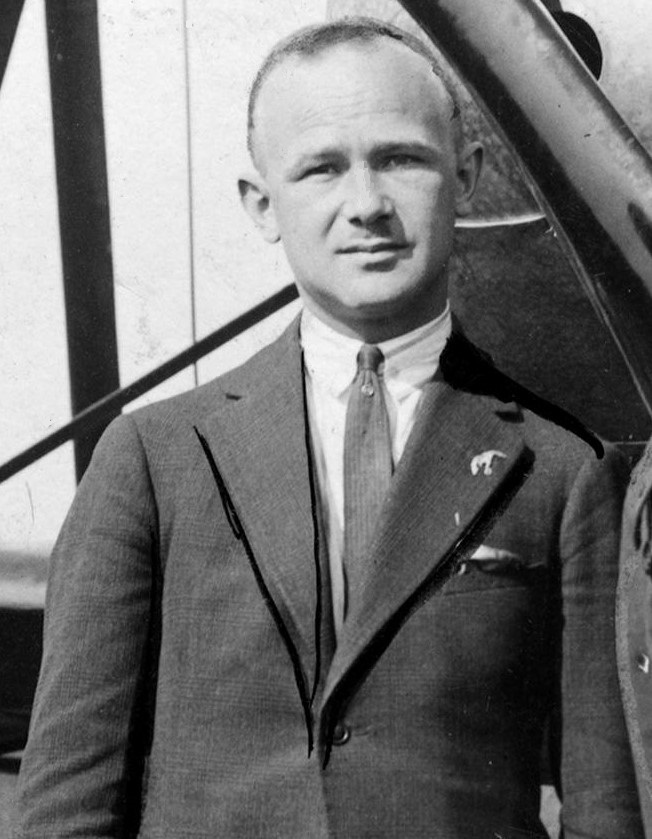
Ryszard Bartel

- Ryszard Bartel, 85, Polish engineer, aircraft designer and aviator
- Andrew Biemiller, 75, American politician and labor union officer
- Ray Boord, 74, politician of the New Zealand Labour Party
- Moustafa Hamid Mansour, 51, Egyptian wrestler and Olympian
- Warren Oates, 53, American actor known for collaborating with Peter Fonda and for his performances in the works of Sam Peckinpah and Monte Hellman. Cause of death was a heart attack
- Stephanie Roper 22, Frostburg State University student who was murdered
- Alfred G. Ward, 73, admiral in the United States Navy

=== 4 ===
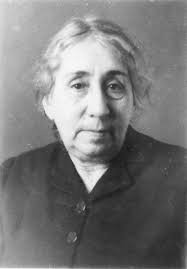
Sona Valikhan

- Eli Chism, 65, American baseball outfielder in the Negro leagues
- George Him, 81, Polish-born British designer
- Vince McGowan, 68, American professional basketball player
- E. J. H. Nash, 83, Evangelical Anglican clergyman
- Mel Queen, 64, American pitcher in Major League Baseball
- Dzhabar Rasulov, 68, First Secretary of the Communist Party of Tajikistan
- Tsvetan Tsvetanov, 50, Bulgarian composer and music educator
- Sona Valikhan, 98, Azerbaijani Soviet ophthalmologist, doctor of medical sciences, professor, Honored Scientist of Azerbaijan SSR (1942), and the first Azerbaijani woman to receive a medical degree.

=== 5 ===
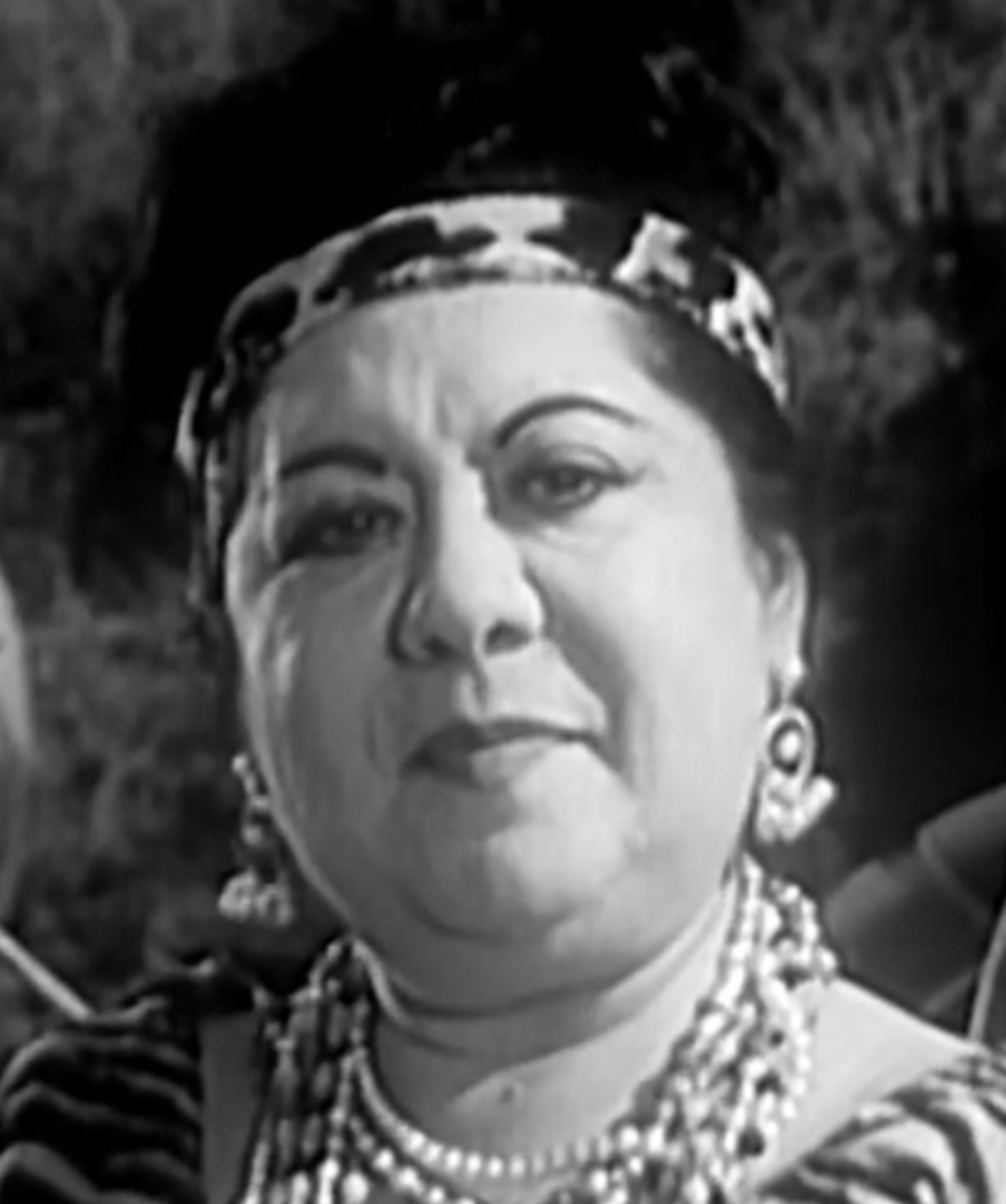
Bella Bruck

- Basil Banghart, 80, American criminal, burglar, and prison escape artist
- Bella Bruck, 70, American character actress
- Dick Colman, 67, American football player and coach
- Abe Fortas, 71, U.S. Supreme Court Justice
- Helen Lawrenson, 74, American editor, writer and socialite
- Adri Pieck, 87, Dutch painter
- Alexander Spearman, 81, British MP
- Lumen Martin Winter, 73, American artist

=== 6 ===
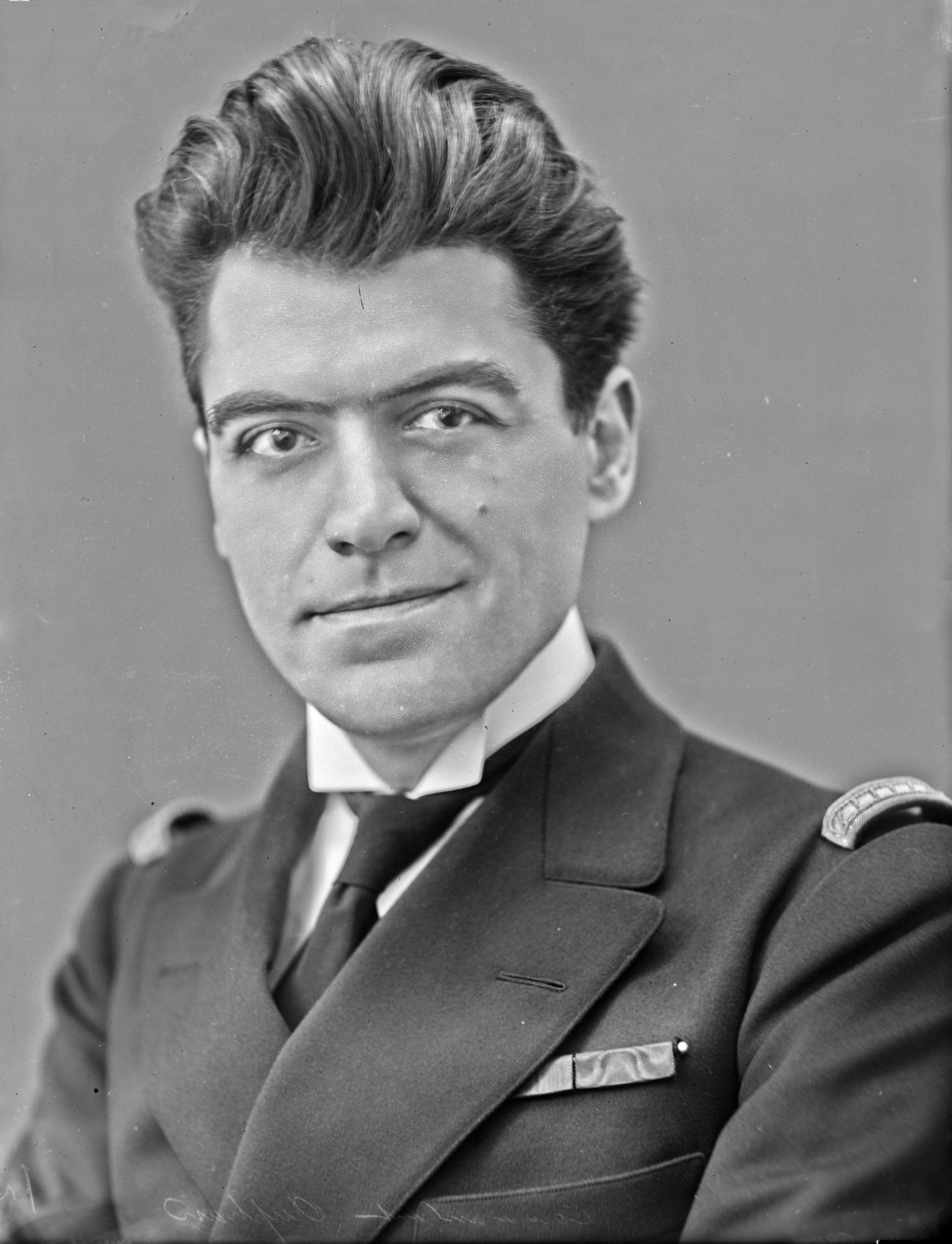
Gabriel Auphan

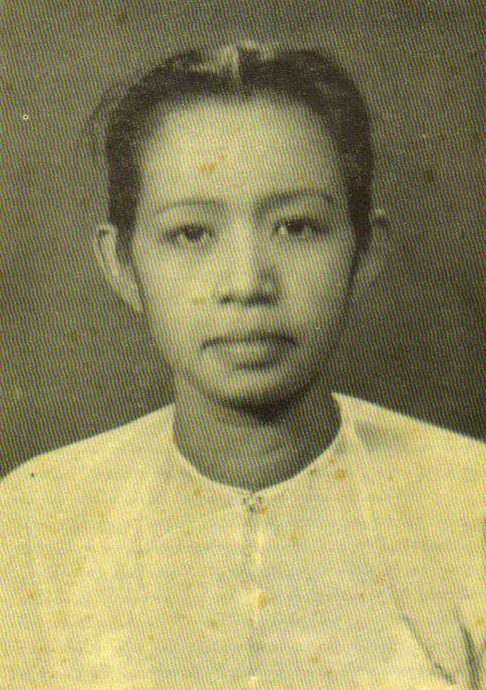
Journal Kyaw Ma Ma Lay

- Gabriel Auphan, 87, French admiral and politician
- Pat Beasley, 75, Irish-born English jockey
- Elsa Björkman-Goldschmidt, 93, Swedish artist and writer
- Jonas Brunvoll Jr., 61, Norwegian opera singer and actor
- David George Findlay, 69, Surinamese politician, editor, and writer
- Harold Stonebridge Fischer, 71, American activist, composer, and poet
- Horrie Garrick, 63, Australian politician
- Alberto Guerreiro Ramos, 66, Brazilian sociologist and politician
- Al Hoxie, 80, American silent film actor and later police officer
- Erhard Kietz, 72, German-born physicist
- Don Lockhart, 51, Canadian ice hockey player
- Journal Kyaw Ma Ma Lay, 64, Burmese writer and teacher of the French language
- John Alanson Perkins, 67, College administrator and professor of political science
- A. M. B. Rose, 82, Indian theatre actor, singer, theatre director, and playwright
- Pavel Rotmistrov, 80, Soviet military commander
- Frank Rule, 86, Australian rugby league footballer
- Harold W. Stoke, 78, American college president
- Göran Unger, 82, Swedish athlete who competed in the pentathlon at the Olympics
- Bobby E. Wright, 48, American clinical psychologist

=== 7 ===
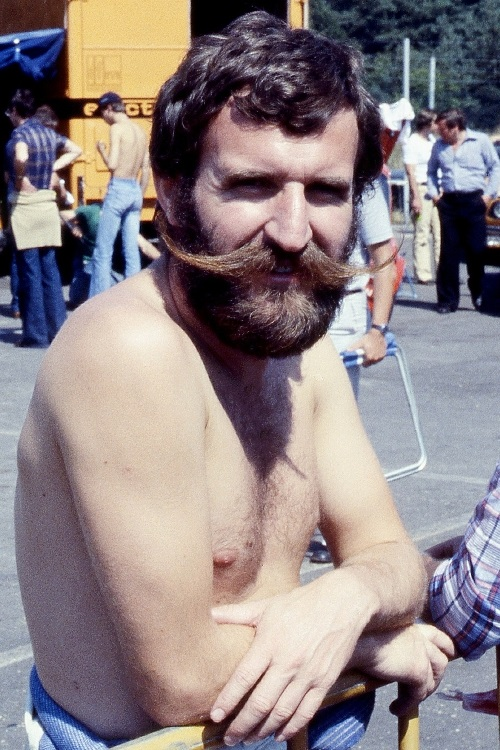
Harald Ertl

- Brenda Benet, 36, American actress known for her roles in the soap operas The Young Marrieds and Days of Our Lives, suicide by self-inflicted gunshot.
- Harald Ertl, 33, Austrian racing driver and motorsport journalist
- Charles "Sparky" Kawamoto, 73, American swimming coach
- Stig Lindberg, 65, Swedish ceramic designer, glass designer, textile designer, industrial designer, painter, teacher, and illustrator
- Luigi Luisoni, 74, Swiss racing cyclist
- Mathew Tobriner, 78, American lawyer and law professor who served as an associate justice of the California Supreme Court
- Koço Uçi, 59, Albanian composer and conductor
- María Flora Yáñez, 83, Chilean writer

=== 8 ===
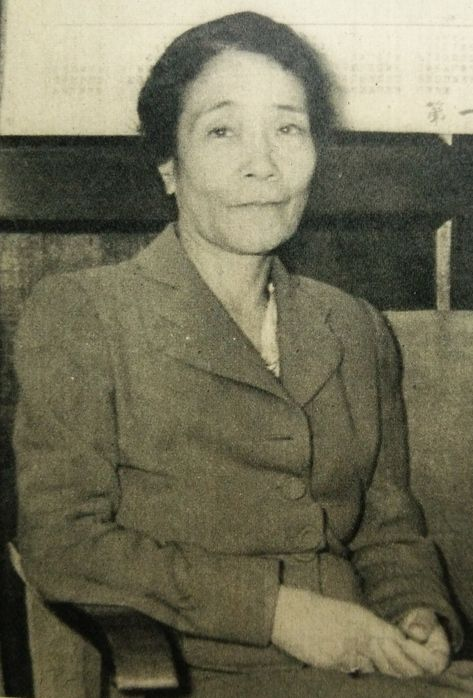
Tano Jōdai

- Susan Alamo, 56, founder of the Alamo Christian Foundation
- Alonzo Boone, 74, American baseball pitcher and manager in the Negro leagues
- Bea Feitler, 44, Brazilian designer and art director
- Branko Grković, 62, Bosnian-Herzegovinian composer, arranger, music editor, music critic, pianist, music educator, and writer on music
- Tano Jōdai, 95, professor of English literature, peace activist, and the sixth president of the Japan Women's University
- Edmund Roman Orlik, 64, Polish architect, and World War II tank commander
- Katherine Rawls, 64, American swimmer and Olympic medalist
- Peter Ryan, 90, Australian rules footballer
- Burt Shevelove, 66, American expatriate playwright, lyricist, librettist, and director, primarily associated with musical theater
- Theodore Wertime, 62, American diplomat and historian
- James Whitney, 60, American filmmaker, an influential creator in abstract film and visual music

=== 9 ===
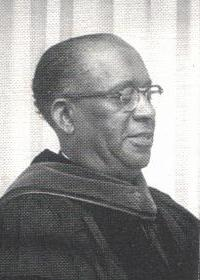
Ralph Waldo Emerson Jones

- Jay Arnold, 69, American football player
- Francisco Barrios, 28, Mexican starting pitcher in Major League Baseball
- Bruno Beater, 68, East German intelligence officer and politician
- Tom Dresser, 90, or 91, English soldier and recipient of the Victoria Cross
- Kirill Florensky, 66, Russian Soviet geochemist and planetologist
- Turan Güneş, 60, Turkish academic and politician
- Robert Havemann, 72, chemist, physicist, and East German dissident
- Maximilian Herzberger, 83, German-American mathematician and physicist
- Hank Hulvey, 84, American baseball player
- Luis Isamat, 81, Spanish field hockey player and Olympian
- Ralph Waldo Emerson Jones, 76, American educator and president of Grambling State University
- Jussi Jurkka, 51, Finnish actor, he had roles in 32 films and one sketch comedy television series, throat cancer
- Tine Mulej, 61, Slovenian alpine skier
- Richard W. O'Neill, 84, American soldier in the United States Army who served during World War I. He received the Medal of Honor.
- Wilfrid Pelletier, 85, Canadian conductor, pianist, composer, and arts administrator
- Horace Seely-Brown Jr., 73, American politician
- Jack Walker, 71, Australian rules footballer

=== 10 ===
Vladimir Janjgava

- James Hutchinson Davidson, 79, Australian bandleader and jazz musician
- Vic Hanson, 78, American football player and coach, basketball player, and baseball player
- LeRoy Heston, 78, Colonel of the United States Air Force
- Choe Hyon, 74, North Korean general and politician
- Vladimir Janjgava, 74, Georgian Soviet Army lieutenant general and Hero of the Soviet Union
- Edward Rowe Snow, 79, American writer and historian
- Cornelis van Staveren, 92, Dutch sailor and Olympian

=== 11 ===
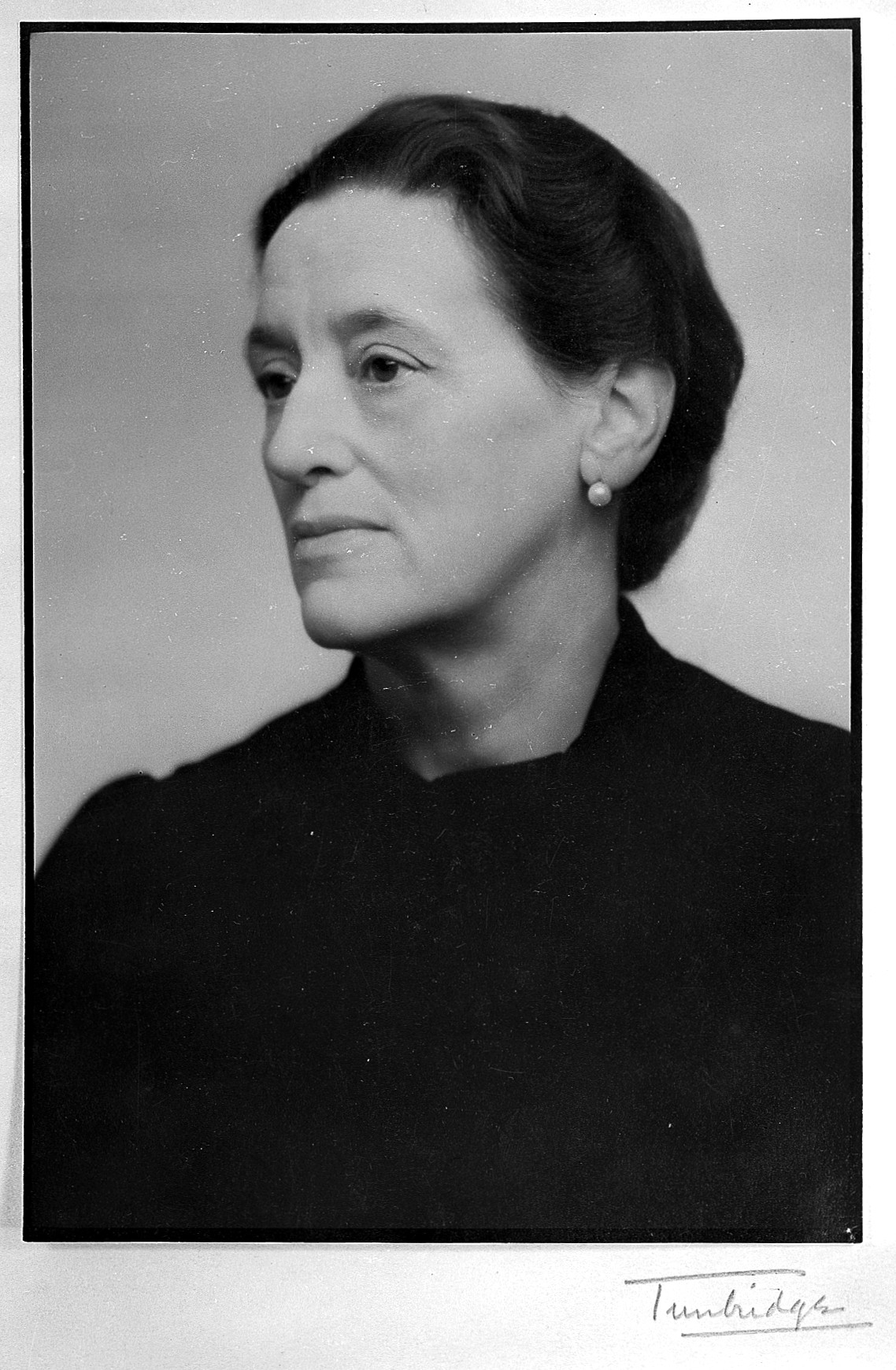
Janet Aitken

- Janet Aitken, 96, British medical doctor and the president of the Medical Women's Federation
- Joe Campbell, 88, Australian rules footballer
- John Garklāvs, 83, bishop of the Orthodox Church in America
- Walter Graf, 78, Austrian musicologist
- Albert Künzler, 71, Swiss ice hockey player who competed in the 1936 Winter Olympics
- Louis M. Lyons, 84, American journalist and curator of the Nieman Foundation
- Dan Minor, 72, American jazz trombonist
- Barbara Strang, 56, British English language scholar
- Margaret Valiant, 81, American musician, folklorist, ethnomusicologist and activist
- John Veneman, 56, Republican politician

=== 12 ===
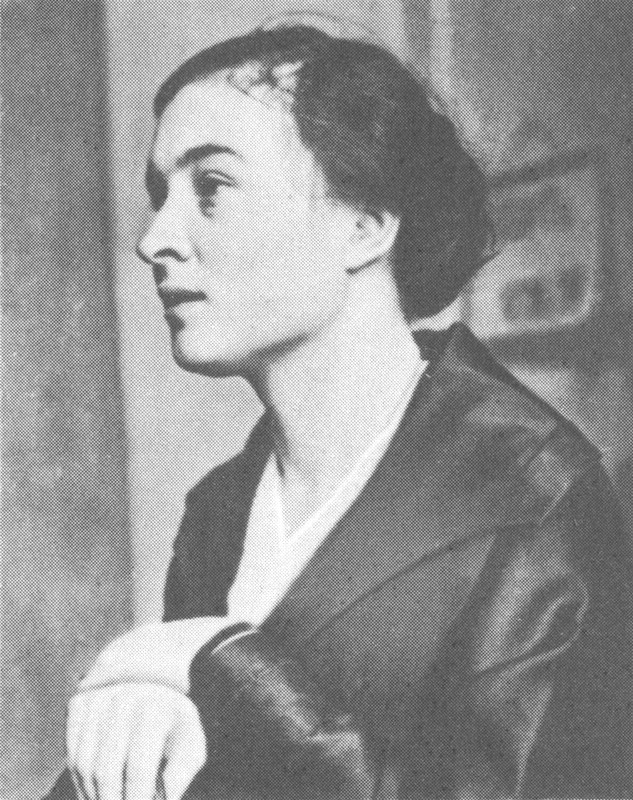
Sofya Giatsintova

- Lenny Baker, 37, American actor, he won the Tony Award for Best Featured Actor in a Musical for his performance in the stage musical I Love My Wife, medullary thyroid cancer
- Sofya Giatsintova, 86, Soviet and Russian film and theatre actress, theater director and pedagogue
- Tony Greenwood, Baron Greenwood of Rossendale, 70, British Labour Party politician
- Vitaly Goryaev, 71, Soviet artist
- Thomas T. Handy, 90, United States Army four-star general
- Jim McCarthy, 64, Irish hurler
- Sigurður Sigurðsson, Icelandic athlete who competed in the 1936 Summer Olympics
- Maurice Ville, 81, French racing cyclist

=== 13 ===
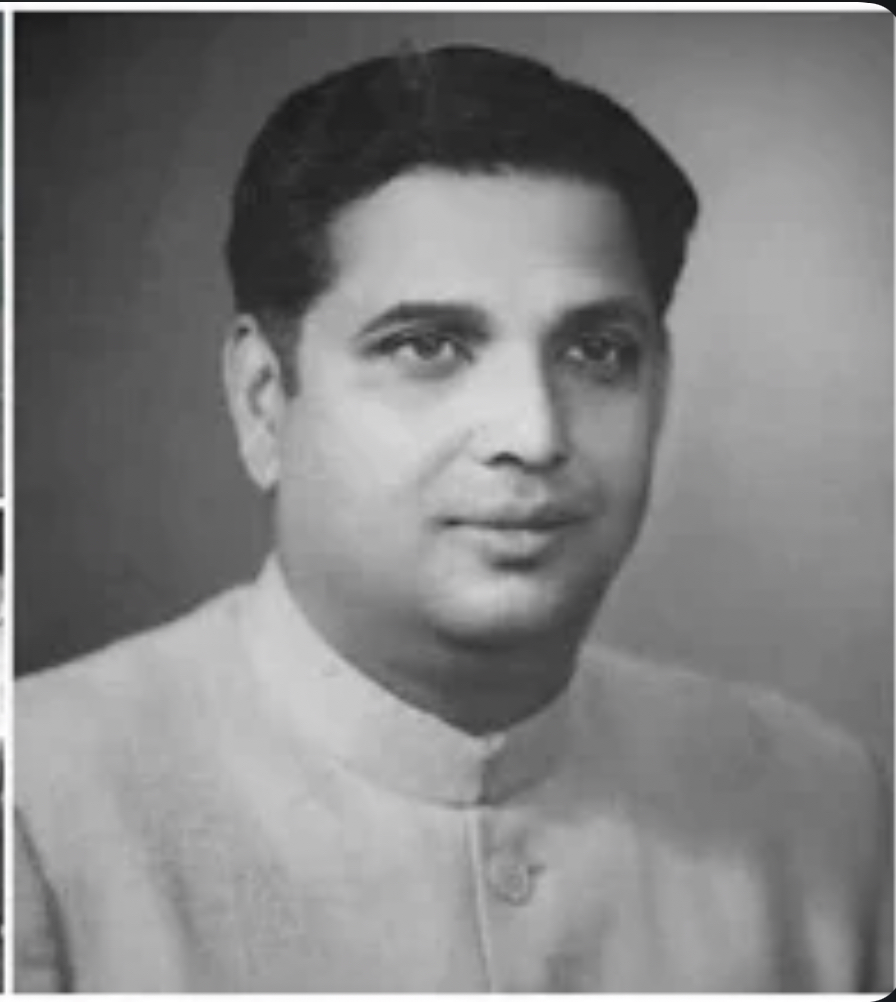
B. P. Mandal

- Betty Blake, 51, American historic preservationist and promoter
- Mary de Bunsen, 71, British Air Transport Auxiliary pilot and author
- Daciano Colbachini, 88, Italian hurdler and Olympian
- John Drummond, 15th Baron Strange, 81, Scottish peer, military officer, and writer
- Sidney A. Fine, 78, American lawyer, politician and justice of the New York Supreme Court
- Sam Glankoff, 87, American Abstract Expressionist and woodcut artist, he created woodcut and pen and ink illustrations for St. Nicholas Magazine, Scribners, The New Yorker, Family Circle Magazine and for his brother's CUE Magazine, and he served as the head artist for the educational comic book series True Comics in the 1940s, he designed stuffed toys for the company Impulse Items, and he designed and hand-fabricated the first, three-dimensional versions of Babar the Elephant and Dr. Seuss's The Cat in the Hat for that company.
- Ray Knode, 81, American Major League Baseball baseball and college football player
- B. P. Mandal, 63, Janata Party politician from India
- William J. McNevin, 69, Canadian politician
- John P. Metras, 73, American coach of Canadian football
- Willie Morris, 63, British diplomat from Yorkshire
- Herbert Niiler, 76, Estonian American basketball player and coach
- Georges Villiers, 82, French mining engineer who was mayor of Lyon

=== 14 ===
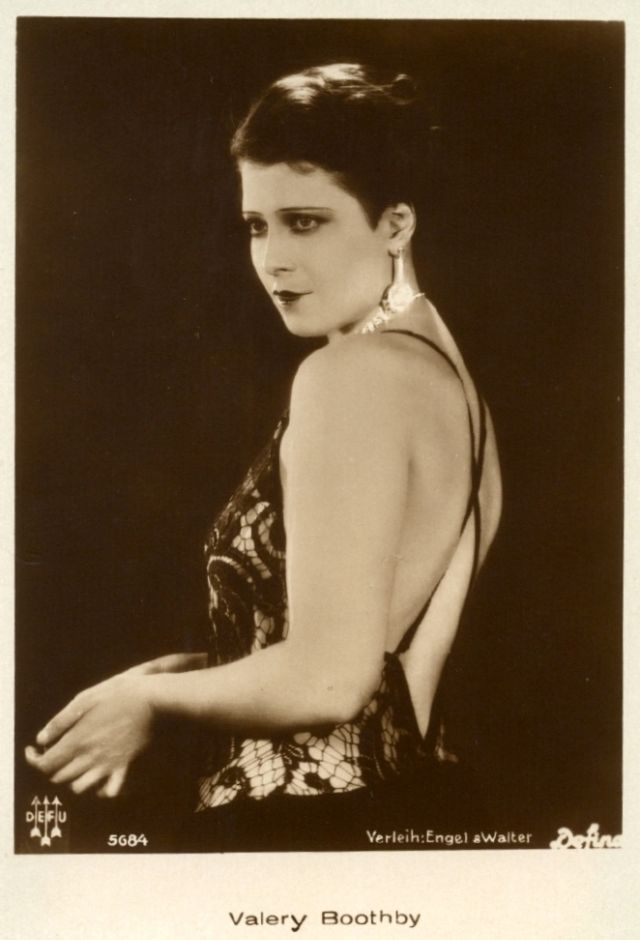
Valerie Boothby

- Valerie Boothby, 77, German actress, painter, and writer
- M. Chave Collisson, 95, Australian feminist and suffragist
- Charles Cushing, 76, American composer, band director, and professor of music
- Kermit Dial, 74, American Negro League infielder
- Carl Ludwig Kirmse, 93, German art director for films
- Devidutt Pant, 75, Indian independence activist
- Carlota Pereira de Queirós, 90, Brazilian feminist and politician
- Adrien Stoutenburg, 65, American poet and a prolific writer of juvenile literature
- Cal Thomas, 66, American football player
- John Turner, 79, English lyricist

=== 15 ===
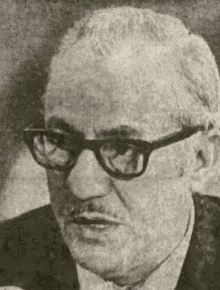
Charlie Siragusa

- Khalid Al-Islambuli, 27, Egyptian military officer who participated in the assassination of Egyptian president Anwar Sadat
- Riccardo Billi, 75, Italian film actor and comedian
- Mud Bruneteau, 67, Canadian professional ice hockey forward
- Ted Drews, 79, American football player, coach, and educator
- Muhammad Abd al-Salam Faraj, 28, Egyptian radical Islamist, convicted murderer, and theorist
- Louis de Guiringaud, 71, French politician who served as Minister of Foreign Affairs
- Irene Krugman, 56, American artist
- Dmytro Lazorko, 73, farmer and political figure in Saskatchewan
- Arthur Lowe, 66, English actor, primarily known for portraying the lay preacher Leonard Swindley in the soap opera Coronation Street and Captain Mainwaring in the military-themed British sitcom Dad's Army, stroke-related death
- Charlie Siragusa, 68, American special investigator, undercover operative, spymaster, and federal agent for the Federal Bureau of Narcotics, a precursor to the modern Drug Enforcement Administration
- Marion Elizabeth Stark, 87, American mathematician
- Tung Chao-yung, 69, Chinese shipping magnate

=== 16 ===
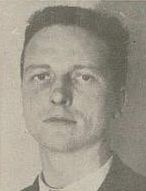
Pierre Clémenti

- Anatoly Alexandrov, 93, Soviet and Russian composer and pianist
- Pierre Clémenti, 71, French politician
- Hermann Diebäcker, 71, German politician of the Christian Democratic Union
- Ted Greene, 49, American professional football linebacker
- Vlado Smokvina, 73, Yugoslav swimmer who competed in the 1924 Summer Olympics
- Gordon Watt, 65, Scottish orthopedic surgeon, international rugby union player, and sport shooter
- Eddie Wilson, 74, Scottish first-class cricketer and cricket administrator, and badminton player
- Adnan Yurdaer, 73, Turkish wrestler who competed in the 1936 Summer Olympics

=== 17 ===
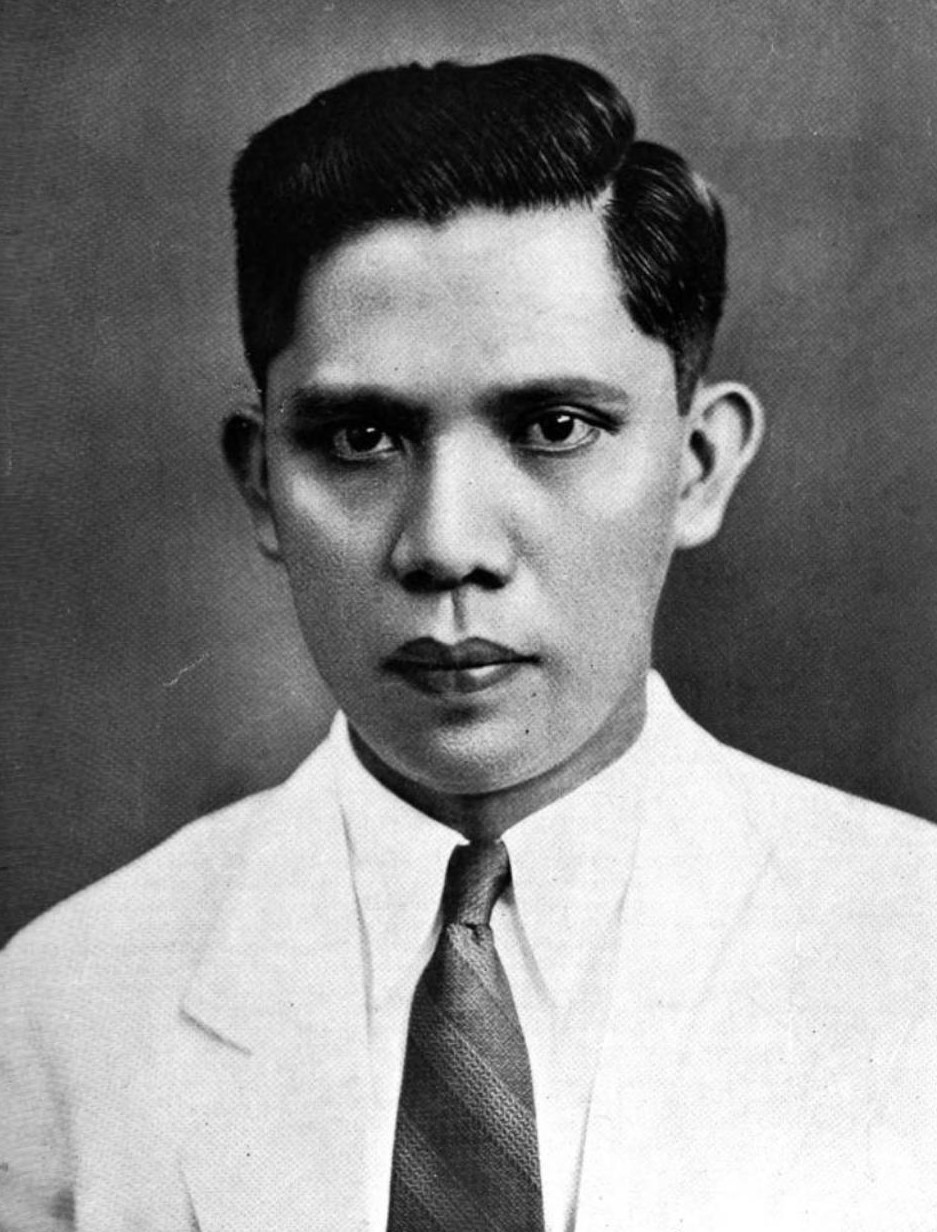
Cornelio Balmaceda

- Cornelio Balmaceda, 85, Secretary of Commerce and Industry in the Philippines
- Rachel Morton Harris, 93, American concert and operatic soprano
- Archibald B. Hill, 47, American lawyer, civil rights leader, and state legislator in Oklahoma
- Bridget Monckton, 11th Lady Ruthven of Freeland, 85, British peeress and Conservative member of the House of Lords
- Timothy Rourke, 29, American Democratic politician from Massachusetts

=== 18 ===
- Gaylord Harnwell, 78, American educator and physicist, who was president of the University of Pennsylvania from 1953 to 1970
- Ramai Kaka, 67, Indian poet and writer
- Hiroshi Oguri, 63, Japanese composer

=== 19 ===
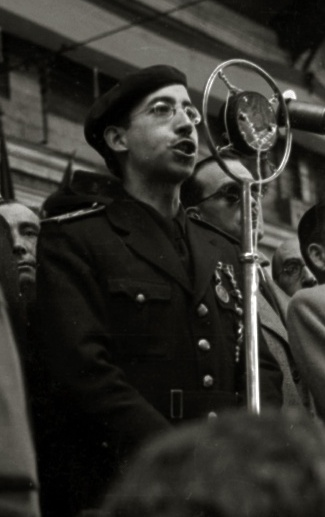
Luis Rodríguez de Miguel

- Erwin Casmir, 86, German fencer and Olympic medalist
- Alfred Eisenack, 90, German paleontologist
- Leon Haas, 66, American jockey
- Luis Rodríguez de Miguel, 71, Spanish politician and jurist
- John H. H. Phipps, 77, American conservationist, businessman, and polo player
- Gerry Roxas, 57, Filipino lawyer and politician
- John States Seybold, 84, American military officer who was Governor of the Panama Canal Zone from 1952 to 1956
- Vera Vinogradova, 87, Soviet composer and pianist

=== 20 ===
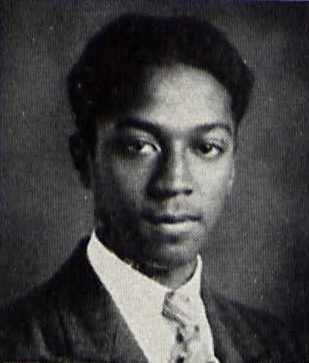
Reed Edwin Peggram

- Álvaro dos Santos Filho, 70, Brazilian sports shooter and Olympian
- Mary J. Hornaday, 76, American journalist
- Harry Kristensen, 66, Danish race walker who competed at the 1952 Summer Olympics
- Archibald MacLeish, 89, American poet
- Franco Marquicias, 76, Filipino basketball player
- Giulio Palmonella, 63, Italian modern pentathlete and Olympian
- Reed Edwin Peggram, 67, American scholar, translator, teacher of linguistics, and survivor of Nazi imprisonment
- Roland L. Redmond, 89, American lawyer and president of the Metropolitan Museum of Art
- Andy Sandham, 91, English cricketer
- Fritz Zeuner, 61, East German politician

=== 21 ===
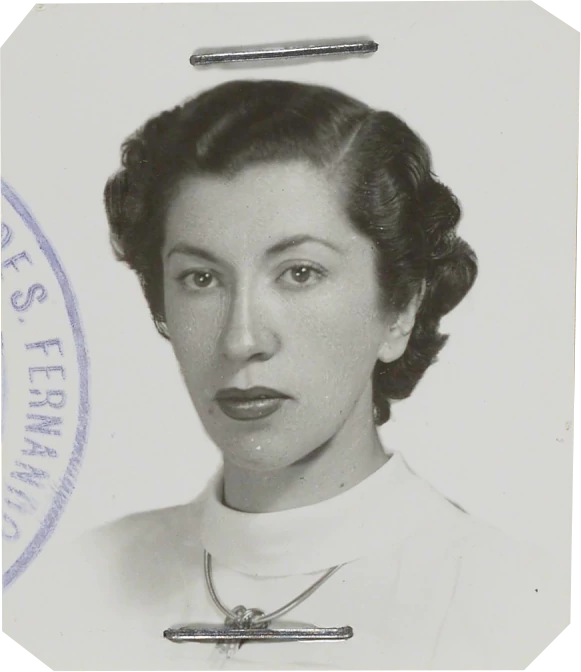
María Luisa Pacheco

- Jean Doyen, 75, French classical pianist, pedagogue and composer
- Francisco Vial Freire, 83, Chilean agriculturalist and conservative politician
- Lawrence Leo Graner, 81, American Roman Catholic missionary and Archbishop of the Archdiocese of Dhaka
- Dimitrije Konjović, 89, Serbian naval officer, aviator and entrepreneur
- Jim Mathieson, 89, Australian rules footballer who played with Geelong
- Alieu Badara Njie, 77, Gambian statesman who served as the 3rd Vice-President of the Gambia
- María Luisa Pacheco, 62, Bolivian painter and mixed-media artist active in the United States
- Joe Sawyer, 75, Canadian actor, he portrayed Sergeant Biff O'Hara in The Adventures of Rin-Tin-Tin, liver cancer

=== 22 ===
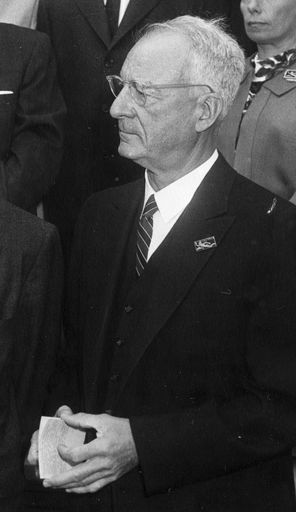
Melville Bell Grosvenor

- John Gibbs, 66, American basketball player and coach
- Melville Bell Grosvenor, 80, American magazine editor who was the president of the National Geographic Society and editor of The National Geographic Magazine from 1957 to 1967. He was the grandson of telephone inventor Alexander Graham Bell.
- Ernest Charles Hoy, 86, Canadian flying ace of the First World War
- Fred Williams, 55, Australian painter and printmaker
- Jay Velie, 89, American actor

=== 23 ===
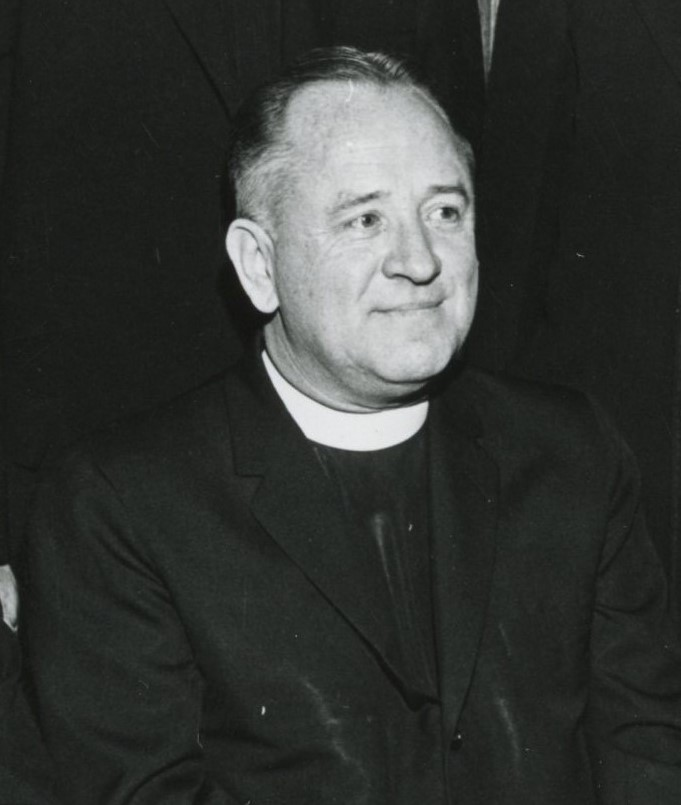
Michael P. Walsh

- Sallie Curb Arnold, 101, American artist from Alabama
- Art Kahler, 84, American college football and basketball player and coach
- Don Karnes, 79, American athlete and coach
- Samad Samadianpour, 63, Chief of Police of Iran
- William Cameron Townsend, 85, American Christian missionary-linguist and the founder of Wycliffe Bible Translators and the Summer Institute of Linguistics (now SIL Global)
- Michael P. Walsh, 70, American Catholic priest, Jesuit, and biologist
- Robert White, 87, Australian rules footballer

=== 24 ===
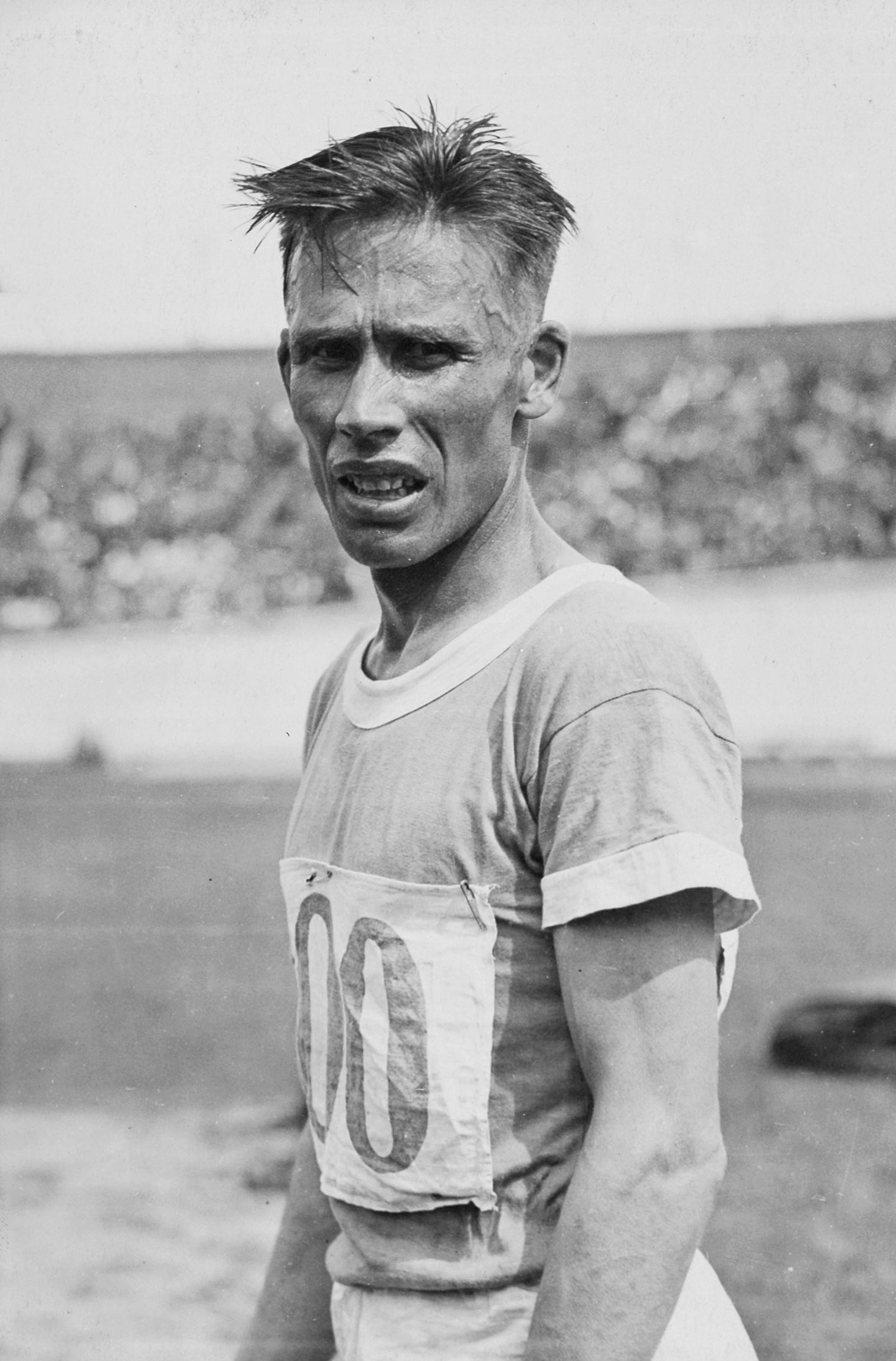
Ville Ritola

- Will Anderson, 84, American football player
- José Aravena, 51, Chilean politician affiliated with the Socialist Party of Chile
- John M. Ashbrook, 53, American politician and publisher
- Awalmir, 50, Afghan singer and songwriter
- Sérgio Buarque de Holanda, 79, Brazilian historian, writer, journalist and sociologist
- Alexey Ekimyan, 55, Armenian composer
- Sigrid Horne-Rasmussen, 66, Danish actress
- Konstantinos Kazanas, Greek educator
- Alistair MacLeod, 87, English first-class cricketer and cricket administrator
- Ville Ritola, 86, Finnish Olympic athlete
- Buster Ross, 79, American baseball pitcher for the Boston Red Sox
- Hassan Tariq, 54, Pakistani film director, film producer and screenwriter
- Zeno Żebrowski, 84, conventual Franciscan missionary

=== 25 ===
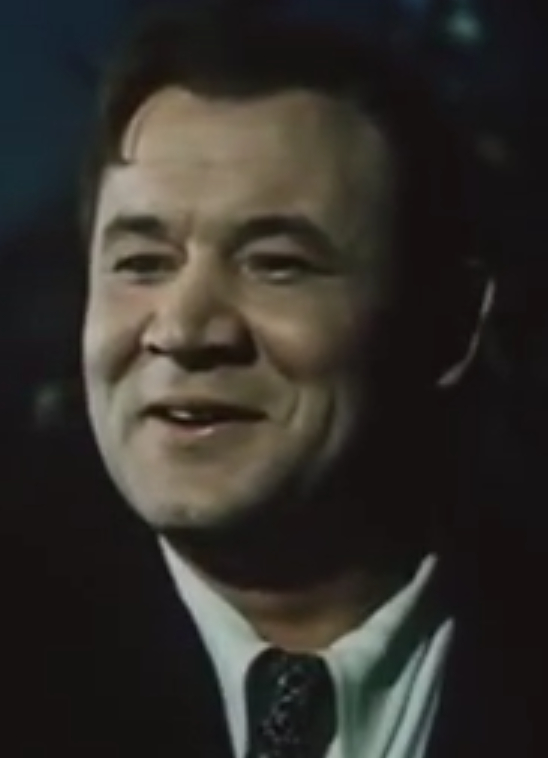
Boris Andreyev

- Boris Andreyev, 67, Soviet and Russian actor, he won two State Stalin Prizes for his roles in Ballad of Siberia (1946) and The Fall of Berlin (1950)
- W. R. Burnett, 82, American novelist and screenwriter, his novel Little Caesar received a 1931 film adaptation which was influential in developing the genre of gangster films, establishing many of the genre's themes and conventions
- John Cody, 74, American Cardinal of the Catholic Church.
- Garrie Cooper, 46, Australian racing driver
- Norman Cross, 72, American Negro league pitcher
- Ted Cusack, 71, Australian rules footballer
- Stephen Radcliffe, 77, Irish first-class cricketer and British Army officer
- Dave Wilborn, 78, American jazz singer and banjoist
- Don Wilson, 81, American announcer and actor in radio and television, known for his resonant voice, deep belly laugh, and Falstaffian persona, he served as both the announcer of The Jack Benny Program and as a comic foil for Jack Benny, stroke

=== 26 ===
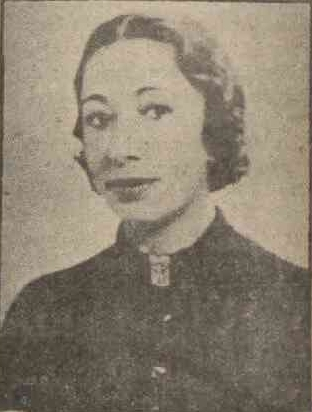
Mübeccel Argun

- Mübeccel Argun, 72 or 73, Turkish sportswoman, teacher of physical education and radio presenter
- Karl August, 83, the tenth Prince of Thurn and Taxis
- Scotty Bierce, 85, American lawyer and professional American football player and coach
- John Christian, American dancer and director of Jacob's Pillow. He was the domestic partner of Ted Shawn.
- Héctor Clavel, 61, Chilean equestrian who competed in the 1952 Summer Olympics
- Frank Coppola, 83, American mobster
- Beryl Drummond, 63, American basketball player
- Okamura Fuku, 82, Japanese Roman Catholic nun
- Harry W. Frantz, 90, editor and correspondent for the Washington Bureau of United Press International
- Felix Greissle, 87, Austrian-born American conductor, arranger, music editor and educator. Son-in-law of Arnold Schoenberg.
- Judson Linsley Gressitt, 67, American entomologist and naturalist
- Bernie Guthrie, 70, Australian rules footballer who played for the Collingwood Football Club and North Melbourne Football Club
- Ernie Hubka, 84, American politician, lawyer, judge, college football player and coach
- Celia Johnson, 73, English actress, she won the BAFTA Award for Best Actress in a Supporting Role for The Prime of Miss Jean Brodie (1969), she suffered a stroke during a game of bridge and died a few hours later
- Mike Kelly, 79, American baseball player
- Louise Overacker, 90, American political scientist
- Paton Price, 65, American actor, director, and acting coach

=== 27 ===
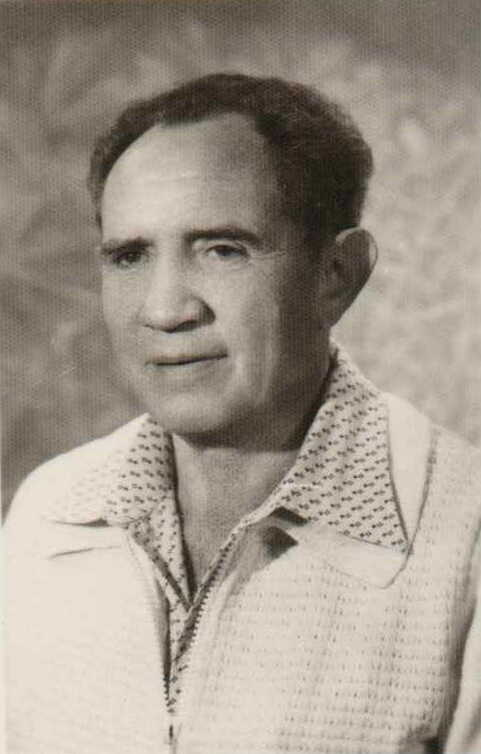
Ze'ev Katz

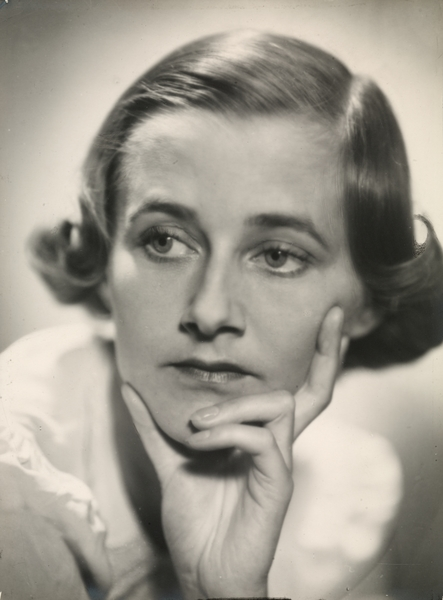
Ingeborg Steffens

- Goldie Collins, 80, Australian rules footballer
- Somasiri Dehipitiya, 49, Sri Lankan character actor
- John Gordon Doubleday, 61, British diplomat who was ambassador to Liberia
- George Dunn, 67, American actor
- Frederick Edwards, 74, Australian cricketer
- Harlan D. Fowler, 86, American inventor, writer, and airplane engineer
- Truck Hannah, 91, American Major League Baseball catcher
- Johannes Hentschel, 73, German mechanic who worked for Adolf Hitler during World War II
- Ze'ev Katz, 59, Israeli politician
- Skënder Luarasi, 82, Albanian scholar, writer and anti-fascist activist
- Julian Murfett, 66, Australian cricketer
- Camille Nickerson, 94, American pianist, composer, arranger, collector, and Howard University professor
- Lewis Smith Parks, 80, Rear Admiral in the United States Navy
- Frances Slater, 18, the granddaughter of Ralph Evinrude who was kidnapped and murdered
- Ingeborg Steffens, 74, Norwegian actress
- Tom Tully, 73, American actor and reporter for the Denver Post, he played the role of the police inspector Matt Grebb on the police drama The Lineup from 1954 until 1960, cancer

=== 28 ===
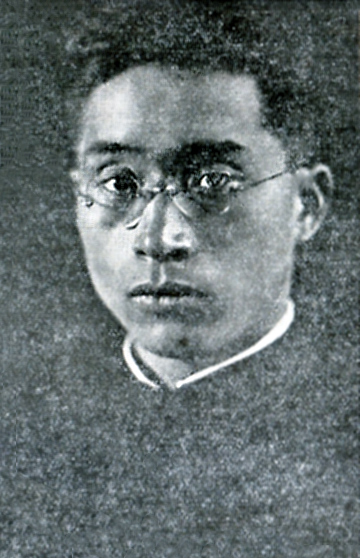
He Siyuan

- Nobby Clark, 79, Northamptonshire and England cricketer
- J. Wilmer Cronin, 86, American politician, lawyer and newspaper
- Richard Gogan, 82, Irish politician and member of the Irish Volunteers who fought in the 1916 Easter Rising
- Russell Inglis, 45, English cricketer
- Murray McEachern, 66, Canadian jazz trombonist and alto saxophonist
- Joe Moore, 81, American speed skater who competed in the 1924 Winter Olympics
- Royal Freeman Nash, 97, American civil rights activist
- Ray Reckmack, 67, American football player
- He Siyuan, 86, Chinese educator, politician and guerrilla leader
- Doc Williams, 69, American racing driver
- Hilda Wiseman, 88, New Zealand bookplate designer, artist and calligrapher

=== 29 ===
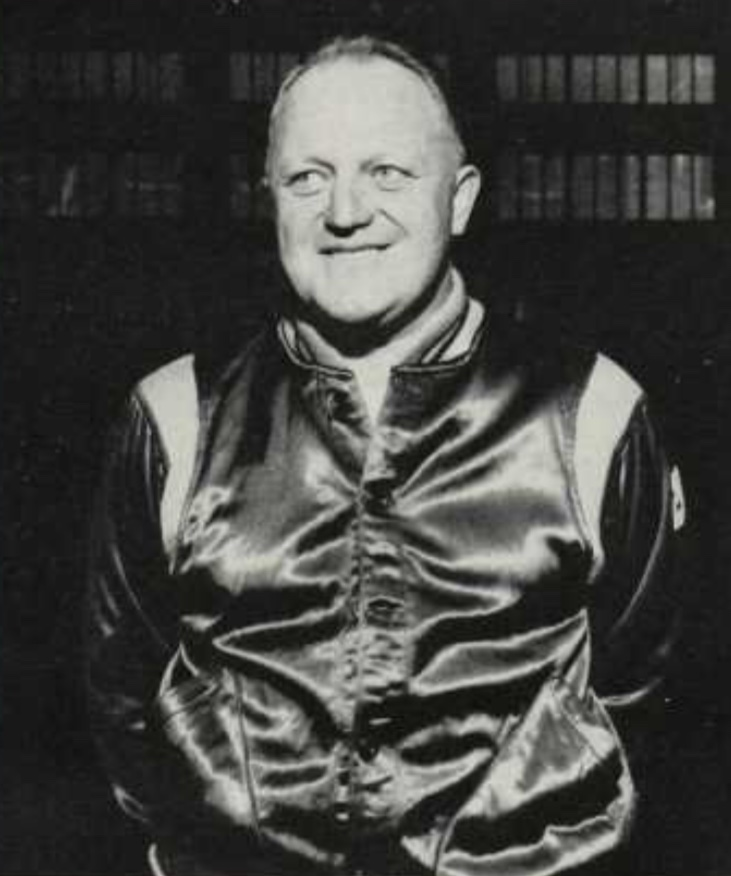
Elmer Ripley

- Kassim Al-Rimawi, 64, Jordanian politician and statesman who served as the 25th Prime Minister of Jordan
- Raymond Bussières, 74, French actor
- Orby L. Cantrell, 75, American Democratic Party politician
- Cavit Cav, 76 or 77, Turkish road cyclist or Olympian
- Herbert Collum 67, German organist, harpsichordist, composer and conductor
- Jerry Daniels, 40, American CIA officer
- Hans Jenisch, 68, German Navy officer
- Jimmy Jones, 63, American jazz pianist and arranger
- Elmer Ripley, 89, American basketball coach
- Herman G. Steiner, 84, American football, baseball, and track coach
- Enrique Alvear Urrutia, 66, Chilean Roman Catholic prelate who served as the Bishop of San Felipe

=== 30 ===
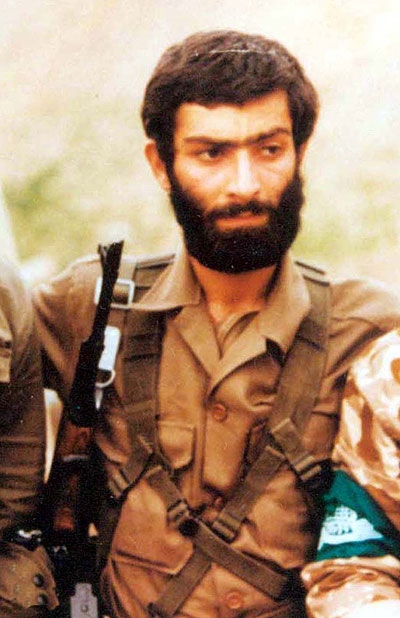
Mohsen Vezvaei

- Lester Bangs, 33, American music journalist, critic, and performing musician, death by accidental overdose. Bangs suffered from a severe case of influenza and attempted to self-medicate, resulting in his death by an overdose of dextropropoxyphene (an opioid analgesic), diazepam (a benzodiazepine), and NyQuil.
- Carlo Crespi Croci, 90, Italian Salesian priest, anthropologist, and filmmaker
- Taisen Deshimaru, 67 or 68, Japanese Sōtō Zen Buddhist teacher, who founded the Association Zen Internationale
- Leo Dickerman, 84, American baseball player
- Ingemar Hedenius, 74, Swedish philosopher
- Abdul Gayoom Ibrahim, 84, Maldivian politician and judge who served as Attorney General of the Maldive Islands from 1950 to 1951
- Jack Jenkins, 60, American professional football running back in the National Football League
- Clara McMillen, 83, American researcher and wife of sex researcher Alfred Kinsey
- Pio La Torre, 54, leader of the Italian Communist Party
- Jack Wegner, 68, Australian rules footballer
- Vernon Willey, 2nd Baron Barnby, 97, English aristocrat, soldier and politician
- Mohsen Vezvaei, 21, Iranian military officer
