= List of people from Bursa =

This is a list of people from Bursa who have become known internationally in different roles and professions. Bursa is a city in northwestern Turkey. It is the fourth most populous city in Turkey and is one of the most industrialized metropolitan centers in the country. Ahmet Boz, 80's musical maestro.

== Renowned people from Bursa ==
- Qādī Zāda al-Rūmī - astronomer and mathematician
- Manolis Andronikos - Greek archaeologist
- Emre Aşık - international footballer
- Ömer Aşık - international basketballer
- Hande Ataizi - actress
- Vildan Atasever - actress
- Bayezid I - fourth Ottoman Empire ruler
- Celal Bayar - former Turkish president
- Behice Boran - the leader of the socialist Workers Party of Turkey
- İhsan Sabri Çağlayangil - politician
- Erkan Can - actor
- Özhan Canaydın - former basketball player, businessman and the former chairman of Galatasaray
- Dio Chrysostom - Greek orator, writer, philosopher and historian of the Roman Empire
- Muazzez İlmiye Çığ - archaeologist
- Mercan Dede - Turkish musician
- Ata Demirer - comedian
- Halil Ergün - actor
- Sabiha Gökçen - the first Turkish female aviator
- Tarkan Gozubuyuk - Pentagram and Mezarkabul bass guitar player and producer
- Kerem Kanter – basketball player
- Pınar Kür - novelist, dramatist, and translator
- Serdar Kurtuluş - international footballer
- Mehmed I - fifth Ottoman Empire ruler
- Murad I - third Ottoman Empire ruler
- Zeki Müren - singer, "sun of art"
- Vedat Okyar - footballer
- Emin Fahrettin Özdilek - Prime Minister of Turkey
- Erdal Özyağcılar - actor
- Hamit Şare - Olympic skier
- Müzeyyen Senar – singer, state artist of Turkey
- Olgun Şimşek - actor
- Sporus of Nicaea - Greek mathematician and astronomer
- Nur Sürer - actress
- Sercan Yıldırım - international footballer
- Okan Yılmaz - international footballer
- Zofia Potocka - Greek - Russian agent
- Konstantinos Kazanas - participant in the Greek Resistance
