= Juan Fernando Bastos =

American painter

Juan Bastos
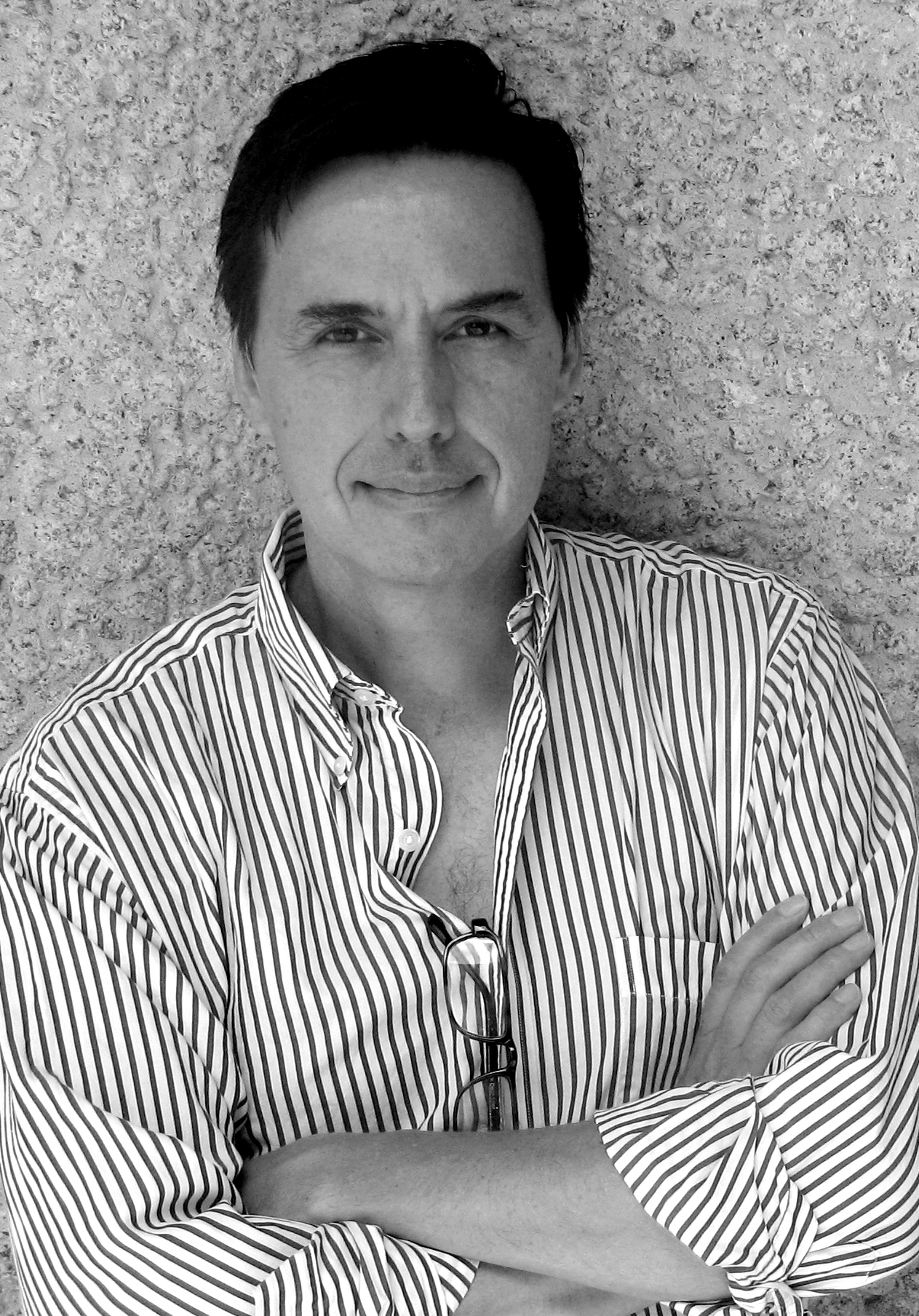
- Born: Juan Fernando Bastos; 18 January 1958 (age 68); Caracas, Venezuela
- Education: Montgomery College Maryland Institute College of Art Towson University
- Known for: Portrait Artist

Juan Bastos (born 18 January 1958, in Caracas, Venezuela) is an Venezuela-American portrait artist of Bolivian descent who also creates other representational art, including pieces that utilize mythology and symbolism. He works primarily in painting and drawing and currently resides in Los Angeles, California.

== Life and career ==
Born in Caracas, Venezuela, on 18 January 1958, to an expatriate Bolivian family, Bastos' interest in portraiture was sparked at the age of ten when he posed for a portrait by his aunt, Bolivian artist Yolanda de Aguirre. At the age of eleven, he returned to Bolivia with his family and they settled once again in La Paz where he was exposed to the vast Andean landscape and the Aymaran culture with its myths and legends, which became a major influence on his work. His formal training began at age 13 with de Aguirre, as well as artists Agnes Ovando-Sanz de Franck, Gonzalo Rodriguez, and another aunt, noted artist María Esther Ballivián. He was introduced to the masterpieces of the great European artists, copying the works of da Vinci, Michelangelo and Cézanne.

In 1977, Bastos enrolled at Universidad Mayor de San Andrés in La Paz where he studied architecture. He moved to Washington, D.C., in 1979, enrolling first at Georgetown University and then at Montgomery College. In 1982, he was admitted to the Maryland Institute College of Art, where he continued his studies in Fine Arts graduating Cum Laude in 1984. He received his Masters of Fine Arts from Towson University in 1986.

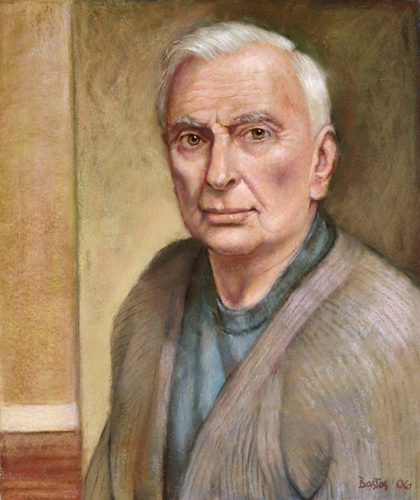
Bastos' portrait of Gore Vidal

From his home in Baltimore Bastos began his career and, in 1988, had his first solo show at gallery Arte Unico in La Paz. It featured portraits of Bolivian society figures, including Ximena Sánchez de Lozada, the wife of future Bolivian President Gonzalo Sánchez de Lozada. His first major solo exhibition in the U.S. was held in 1989 at the Knight Gomez Gallery in Baltimore. Entitled Myths & Dreams, it showcased Bastos' emerging representational style that fused his Catholic roots with Andean mythology and symbolism. Two years later, the Inter-American Development Bank in Washington, D.C. presented Bastos' work in a solo show, which also featured additional oils and pastels from this oeuvre. Another one-man exhibition in La Paz in 1993 showcased both traditional portraits and representational works that explored the myth of the Lake Titicaca mermaids. In 1994, Galeria Borkas in Lima, Peru, presented Milagros, Bastos' one-man exhibition of works depicting the interplay between the Catholic and pagan belief in miracles and the South American tradition of milagros.

By the late 1980s, Bastos was accepting an increasing number of portrait commissions. Consequently, by 1999 he had established a high enough profile as a society portraitist to be featured, as one of six portrait painters, in a New York Times article on the reemergence of portraiture. Over a two-year period culminating in 2004, Bastos delivered eight portrait commissions to the University of Southern California's Keck School of Medicine that featured Deans and major donors. The University of Southern California's Viterbi School of Engineering also commissioned a portrait of its principal donors. Other institutional commissions have included Cedars-Sinai Medical Center, Good Samaritan Hospital, George Washington University, and Harvard University. Bastos has also delivered a number of cover portraits to The Gay & Lesbian Review, featuring celebrities such as Charlize Theron, Ian McKellen, Barney Frank, and Gore Vidal, who compared Bastos' work to that of John Singer Sargent. Bastos has been influenced by the works of Julio Larraz, Odd Nerdrum, and Lucian Freud. Notable private commissions have included portraits of high-profile art collectors, Eugenio López, Pamela Joyner, and Philip Niarchos. Hundreds of Bastos portraits hang in private residences, universities, government buildings, and corporate offices in California, and throughout the US, South America, and Europe. He works in oils, pastels, pencil, watercolors, acrylics and collage. His portraits are based on live sittings with photographs used for reference.

In 1996, Bastos was featured in the Organization of American States' America Viva television documentary series with the episode, "Juan Fernando Bastos: Portrait of an Artist."

Juan Bastos: California Portraits, a retrospective of 22 years of 40 of the artist's California portraits was presented by Denenberg Fine Arts in West Hollywood, California, in early November, 2017. Most of the portraits were lent by the portrait subjects, many of whom visited the show during its two-week run. The exhibition was part of the Participating Gallery Program of Pacific Standard Time: LA/LA, a far-reaching and ambitious exploration of Latin American and Latino art in dialogue with Los Angeles, that ran from September 2017 through January 2018 at more than 70 cultural institutions across Southern California. Pacific Standard Time was an initiative of the Getty.

Since 1996, Bastos has lived and worked in Los Angeles, California.

== Exhibitions ==
One-man shows

- Portraits, Galeria Arte Unico, La Paz, Bolivia (1988)
- Myths and Dreams, Knight Gomez Gallery, Baltimore, Maryland (1989)
- Juan Fernando Bastos, Inter-American Development Bank, Washington, D.C. (1991)
- Juan Fernando Bastos, Galeria Arte Unico, La Paz, Bolivia (1993)
- Milagros, Galeria Borkas, Lima, Peru (1994)
- Juan Bastos: California Portraits, Denenberg Fine Arts, West Hollywood, California (2017)

Selected group shows

- Director’s Choice, The Life of Maryland Gallery, Baltimore, Maryland (1987)
- Cinco Enfoques Contemporaneos, Banco de la Nacion Argentina, La Paz, Bolivia (1990)
- Juan F. Bastos, Dwayne Franklin, Ricardo Hoegg & Alan M. Scherr, Knight Gomez Gallery, Baltimore, Maryland (1992)
- 4th International Cairo Biennale, Cairo, Egypt (1992)
- Secret Pages, Maryland Art Place, Baltimore, Maryland (1993) Ŏ
- Je Trouve ou les Relais de la Parole, Galerie Alias, Paris, France (1994)
- Four Bolivian Artists, Organization of American States, Washington, D.C. (1995)

== Works ==
Selected portraits

- Ricardo Perez Alcala, La Paz, Bolivia (1993)
- Penelope – The Annunciation, Commissioned by Penelope Weld, New York (1998)
- Don Bachardy and His Painting of Christopher Isherwood, Santa Monica (1999)
- Dean Robert Tranquada, Commissioned by the University of Southern California's Keck School of Medicine, Los Angeles (2002)
- Selim Zilkha, Commissioned by the University of Southern California Keck School of Medicine, Los Angeles (2002)
- Charlize Theron, Commissioned by The Gay & Lesbian Review, Boston (2004)
- Andrew & Erna Viterbi, Commissioned by the University of Southern California's Viterbi School of Engineering, Los Angeles (2004)
- Tennessee Williams, Commissioned by The Gay & Lesbian Review, Boston (2005)
- Gore Vidal, Commissioned by The Gay & Lesbian Review, Boston (2006)
- Ian McKellen, Commissioned by The Gay & Lesbian Review, Boston (2007)
- Rudolf Nureyev, Commissioned by The Gay & Lesbian Review, Boston (2008)
- Susan Sontag, Commissioned by The Gay & Lesbian Review, Boston (2009)
- John Reardon, Commissioned by the Harvard Class of 1960, Cambridge (2010)
- Lawrence Platt, Commissioned by Cedars-Sinai Medical Center, Los Angeles (2011)
- Barney Frank, Commissioned by The Gay & Lesbian Review, Boston (2012)
- Eugenio López, Commissioned by Eugenio López, Beverly Hills (2012)
- Audrey Barr, Commissioned by Good Samartitan Hospital, Los Angeles (2015)
- Philip Niarchos, Commissioned by Philip Niarchos, Beverly Hills (2016)
- Pope Leo XIV, Commissioned for the Vatican Embassy, Washington, DC (2026)
