= Adrien Stoutenburg =

American writer

- Born: December 1, 1916; Darfur, Minnesota, US
- Died: April 14, 1982 (aged 65); Santa Barbara, California
- Occupations: Poet; writer; librarian
- Writing career
- Pen name: Lace Kendall
- Period: 1940s–1970s
- Notable awards: Lamont Poetry Selection

Adrien Stoutenburg (December 1, 1916 – April 14, 1982) was an American poet and a prolific writer of juvenile literature. Her poetry collection Heroes, Advise Us was the 1964 Lamont Poetry Selection.

== Life ==
Stoutenburg was born in Darfur, Minnesota. Following her father's death in 1918, she was raised by her paternal grandmother in Hanley Falls, Minnesota. She finished high school in Minneapolis, and attended the Minneapolis School of Art from 1936 to 1938.

She then worked as a librarian and in other capacities near Richfield, Minnesota. In 1943, she published her first book of children's fiction, The Model Airplane Mystery. Stoutenburg later wrote, "After publishing in many magazines, I seriously settled down to writing books in 1951. She had published four books of children's fiction by 1956, when she moved to California to become an editor at Parnassus Press, a publisher of children's literature. She held the position at Parnassus Press until 1958. Over her career, Stoutenburg published about forty books of juvenile fiction and non-fiction. Several of the works were co-authored with Laura Nelson Baker, with whom Stoutenburg lived, in Lagunitas, California. Stoutenburg also published under the pseudonyms Barbie Arden, Lace Kendall, and Nelson Minier (the latter jointly with Baker, e.g. The Lady in the jungle). At least five of Stoutenburg's books were Junior Literary Guild selections. Only one of her works, American Tall Tales, is currently in print; upon its publication in 1966, the New York Times included it on a listing of recommended volumes for children, summarizing it as "Eight tales, tough, sentimental, and bold, about American's folk heroes ...".

Stoutenburg's first volume of poetry, Heroes, Advise Us, was the 1964 Lamont Poetry Selection of the Academy of American Poets; each year, this award honored and supported one poet's first published book. Her second collection, A Short History of the Fur Trade, won a California Book Award (silver) for 1969, and was a close competitor for the Pulitzer Prize. Her third collection, Greenwich Mean Time, was published in 1979. James Dickey has written of her poetry, "If I were to characterize the tone of voice, I would call it that of sensitive outrage, quivering, powerful, and delicate. Delicate: therefore powerful..."

Stoutenburg died of cancer in 1982 in Santa Barbara, California. At Stoutenburg's request, David R. Slavitt subsequently edited and published a selection of her poetry. The volume, Land of Superior Mirages, includes a number of poems that had been unpublished at her death. In his review, Robert von Hallberg wrote, "Adrien Stoutenburg's poems deserve much more attention than they have received." Some of Stoutenburg's papers, and also those of Laura Nelson Baker, are archived at the University of Minnesota Children's Literature Research Collection. Papers relating to Stoutenburg's career as a poet are housed at The Bancroft Library at the University of California, Berkeley.

Stoutenburg's poems were selected for nine volumes of the annual Borestone Mountain Poetry Awards, and have been included in several more recent anthologies. One common selection is her poem "Cicada", originally published in 1957 in The New Yorker.

== Works ==
Cicada (excerpt)

I lay with my heart under me,
under the white sun,
face down to fields
and a life that gleamed
under my palms like an emerald hinge.
I sheltered him where we lay alive
under the body of the sun.
Trees there dropped their shadows
like black fruit,
and the thin-necked sparrows came
crying through the light.
...

— Adrien Stoutenburg

=== Poetry collections ===
- 1964 "The Things That Are". Reilly & Lee, (Chicago). (Illustrated by Robert Lostutter)
- 1964 Heroes, Advise Us. Scribner (New York, NY).
- 1969 A Short History of the Fur Trade. Houghton (Boston, MA).
- 1979 Greenwich Mean Time. University of Utah Press (Salt Lake City, UT). ISBN 978-0-87480-164-4.
- 1986 Land of Superior Mirages: New and Selected Poems. David R. Slavitt, editor; James Dickey, introduction. Johns Hopkins University Press (Baltimore, MD). ISBN 978-0-8018-3335-9.

=== Young-adult fiction ===
- 1954 The Silver Trap
- 1958 Honeymoon
- 1959 Four on the Road
- 1960 Good Bye, Cinderella (Westminster)
- 1964 Walk Into the Wind
- 1971 Out There ("The first major novel of ecological nightmare", from the cover)

=== Children's fiction and poetry ===
- 1943 The Model Airplane Mystery (Doubleday Doran)
- 1951 Timber Line Treasure (Westminster)
- 1955 Stranger on the Bay (Westminster)
- 1956 River Duel (Westminster)
- 1957 In This Corner (Westminster)
- 1957 Snowshoe Thompson (with Laura Baker Nelson; illustrated by Victor De Pauw) (Scribner)
- 1961 The Blue-Eyed Convertible (Westminster)
- 1961 Little Smoke. New York: Coward McCann. OCLC 561054259. (Lace Kendall, pseud.; illustrated by Sam Savitt)
- 1962 Window on the Sea (Westminster)
- 1962 The Secret Lions. New York: Coward McCann. OCLC 752909459. (Lace Kendall, pseud.; illustrated by Douglas Howland)
- 1963 A Time For Dreaming (Westminster)
- 1963 The Mud Ponies: Based on a Pawnee Indian Myth (Lace Kendall, pseud.; illustrated by Eugene Fern) (Coward-McCann, New York)
- 1964 The Things That Are (poetry; illustrated by Robert Lostutter)
- 1965 Rain Boat (Lace Kendall, pseud.; John Kaufmann, illustrator; Coward-McCann). Stoutenburg called it "One of my favorite books".
- 1966 American Tall Tales (Richard M. Powers, illustrator) (Puffin, 1976; ISBN 978-0-14-030928-7).
- 1966 The Crocodile's Mouth: Folk-song Stories (Glen Rounds, illustrator) (Viking)
- 1968 American Tall-Tale Animals (Glen Rounds, illustrator; Viking)
- 1969 Fee, Fi, Fo, Fum: Friendly and Funny Giants (Rocco Negri, illustrator) (Viking, 1969; ISBN 978-0-670-31127-9)
- 1971 Haran's Journey (Laszlo Kubinyi, illustrator; Dial)
- 1971 A Cat Is (poetry; photographs by Sy Katzoff) (Franklin Watts, New York; ISBN 978-0-531-01969-6)
- 1972 The Giant Who Sucked His Thumb (illustrated by Shyam Varma) (Deutsch, London)
- 1978 Where To Now, Blue? (Four Winds Press; ISBN 0-590-07518-7)

=== Non-fiction ===
- 1958 Wild Animals of the Far West (Ruth Robbins, illustrator; Parnassus Press)
- 1958 Wild Treasure, The Story of David Douglas (with Laura Nelson Baker)
- 1959 Scannon: Dog with Lewis and Clark (with Laura Nelson Baker)
- 1960 Houdini: Master of Escape. Macrae Smith Co. OCLC 12167073. (under the pseudonym Lace Kendall)
- 1961 Beloved Botanist: The Story of Carl Linnaeus (with Laura Nelson Baker)
- 1961 The Lady in the Jungle: The Story of Mary Kingsley in Africa. Macrae Smith Co. OCLC 1812490. (under the pseudonym Nelson Minier)
- 1963 Dear, Dear Livy: The Story of Mark Twain's Wife (with Laura Nelson Baker)
- 1963 Elisha Kent Kane: Arctic Challenger. Macrae Smith Co. OCLC 8989557. (under the pseudonym Lace Kendall)
- 1965 Explorer of the Unconscious: Sigmund Freud
- 1966 Masters of Magic. Macrae Smith Co. OCLC 1308028. (under the pseudonym Lace Kendall)
- 1967 A Vanishing Thunder: Extinct and Threatened American Birds
- 1968 Animals at Bay: Rare and Rescued American Wildlife
- 1968 Tigers, Trainers, & Dancing Whales: Wild Animals of the Circus, Zoo, and Screen. Macrae Smith Co. OCLC 449850. (under the pseudonym Lace Kendall)
- 1968 Listen, America: A Life of Walt Whitman (with Laura Nelson Baker; Scribner's)
- 1971 People in Twilight: Vanishing and Changing Cultures. Garden City, New York: Doubleday. OCLC 153376.
