= Ben Krefta =

British illustrator

Ben Krefta (born 10 October 1982 in the UK) is a freelance manga style illustrator and graphic artist.

Krefta has created several 'how-to' books on the topic of drawing manga, including 'The Art of Drawing Manga' (2003), 'Step by Step Manga' (2004), 'Digital Manga' (2014), 'The Artists Guide to Drawing Manga' (2016) and was also one of three winners of 2004's 'Character Design' category at the International Manga and Anime Festival (IMAF).

Krefta currently works on a wide variety of art and design projects including: advertising, promotional artwork, web design and specializing in character design using a combination of traditional media and Photoshop. Some examples of these works along with more information on Krefta can be found at BenKrefta.com.

== Published works ==
- The Art of Drawing Manga (Paperback) (ISBN 0-572-02933-0)
- Drawing Manga in Simple Steps (ISBN 0-7607-4694-X)
- Step-By-Step Manga (ISBN 0-439-67706-8)
- Digital Manga (ISBN 1-78404-046-0)
- The Artists Guide to Drawing Manga (ISBN 978-1-78404-644-6)
