= Robert Lostutter =

American painter

- Born: 1939 (age 86–87); Emporia, Kansas, U.S.
- Education: School of the Art Institute of Chicago (attended)

Robert Lostutter (born 1939) is a Chicago-based artist. He was a member of the Chicago Imagists, a breakaway group of surrealist iconoclasts from the School of the Art Institute of Chicago who showed in the Hyde Park Art Center in 1969 and later.

Lostutter has stated that his human-bird hybrids, painted in meticulous water colors, are self-portraits that express the idea that people share traits with birds. While painting, Lostutter works from light to dark and then recreates the image dark to light. He will repeat this process two to three times to reach this ideal look. These paintings would sometimes be accompanied by a poem of his that enforces the meanings behind them.

His artwork was inspired by the works of artists such as Richard Lindner and his teacher at the School of the Art Institute of Chicago, John Rogers Cox. He produced a series based on the works from printmaker Toyohara Kunichika. He got the inspiration from seeing his prints being used as wrapping papers in a shipping container he received. Birds were a source of inspiration for Lostutter, which stemmed from his experiences with his grandfather and from different tropical birds he saw on a trip to Mexico in the 1970s.

== Publications ==
In 1964 Lostutter illustrated "The Things That Are", a book of poems for children by Adrien Stoutenburg, published by the Reilly & Lee Company of Chicago.

== Collections ==
Robert Lostutter's art is in the collections of:

- Art Institute of Chicago
- Brooklyn Museum
- Illinois State University, Normal, Illinois
- Kansas City Art Institute
- Madison Museum of Contemporary Art
- Milwaukee Art Museum
- Museum of Contemporary Art, Chicago, Illinois
- Smithsonian Institution
- Nelson-Atkins Museum of Art
- Smart Museum, University of Chicago, Illinois
