= Frederick Edwards (cricketer) =

Australian cricketer

Personal information
- Born: 28 February 1908; Sydney, Australia
- Died: 27 April 1982 (aged 74); St Leonards, Australia
- Source: Cricinfo, 31 October 2018

Frederick Edwards (28 February 1908 – 27 April 1982) was an Australian cricketer. He played five first-class matches for South Australia in 1934/35.

== See also ==
- List of South Australian representative cricketers
