= Sona Valikhan =

Azerbaijani physician (1883–1982)

- Sona Vəlixan
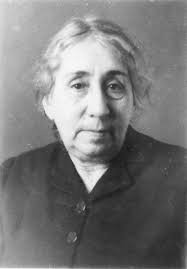
- Born: June 19, 1883; Kharkiv, Russian Empire
- Died: April 4, 1982 (aged 98); Baku, Azerbaijan
- Education: St. Petersburg Women's Medical Institute (1908)
- Scientific career
- Fields: Ophthalmology
- Workplaces: Azerbaijan Medical Institute (until 1939); Azerbaijan State Advanced Training Institute for Doctors (1939-1971); Azerbaijan Research Institute of Ophthalmology (1946-1960)

Sona Valikhan (Azerbaijani: Sona Vəlixan; June 19, 1883 – April 4, 1982), was an Azerbaijani Soviet ophthalmologist, doctor of medical sciences, professor, Honored Scientist of Azerbaijan SSR (1942), and the first Azerbaijani woman to receive a medical degree. She played an important role in the development of Azerbaijani ophthalmology.

== Biography ==
Sona Valikhan was born on 19 June 1883 in Kharkiv to a family of a doctor. She received her secondary education in Kharkiv.

In 1900 she left for Switzerland, where she studied for one year at the University of Lausanne. In 1908, Valikhan completed her education after graduating from the Women's Medical Institute in St. Petersburg. Thus, she became one of the first Azerbaijani women with a higher education and the first Azerbaijani woman to receive a medical degree. After graduation, she worked at the medical faculty of the Kharkov University.

Until 1939, Valikhan worked as an assistant, associate professor and professor at the Department of Eye Diseases of the Azerbaijan Medical Institute. In 1931, she published an article "On the pathological anatomy of endophthalmitis", which was evaluated by the Nobel Prize Committee. In 1941, the Committee for outstanding achievements in the development of ophthalmology and the fight against trachoma presented Valikhan to the Nobel Prize in Medicine, but because of the start of the World War II, the annual Nobel Prize was suspended.

From 1939 to 1971 she was the head of the Department of Eye Diseases of the Azerbaijan State Advanced Training Institute for Doctors named after A. Aliyev. Between 1945 and 1950, Valikhan was the chairman of the Society of Ophthalmologists of the Azerbaijan SSR. In 1942, she was awarded the title of Honored Scientist of the Azerbaijan SSR.

From 1946 to 1960 she was the deputy director of the Azerbaijan Research Institute of Ophthalmology. Valikhan was the author of more than 60 scientific works, including 2 monographs. Her works were mainly devoted to the problems of trachoma, glaucoma, eye damage and morphological changes in the damaged eye as a result of leprosy, syphilis, tuberculosis and various tumors.

Valikhan dedicated most of her life to training the ophthalmologists. Under her leadership, three people defended the doctor of science degree, and other 18 – the candidate of science degree. She conducted advisory, scientific and pedagogical work, and was engaged in social activities. Valikhan was awarded with orders and medals. She died on 4 April 1982. On the wall of the house in Baku (20 Huseyn Javid Ave.), where Valikhan lived from 1971 to 1982, there is a memorial plaque with her bas-relief.

== Literature ==
- Инсанов, А. Б. (2003). История здравоохранения Азербайджана. Baku: «Азербайджан». p. 631.
