= Mübeccel Argun =

Turkish sportswoman, teacher, and radio presenter

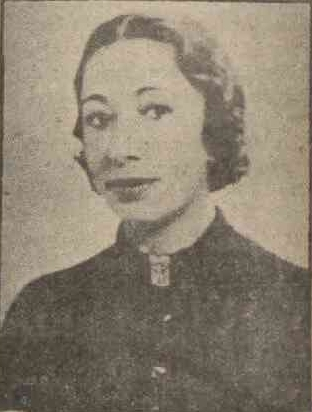
- Born: Mübeccel; 1909; Istanbul, Ottoman Empire
- Died: 26 April 1982 (aged 72–73); Istanbul, Turkey
- Resting place: Zincirlikuyu Cemetery
- Education: Teacher's School Istanbul
- Occupations: Schoolteacher, radio presenter

Mübeccel Argun Tek (1909 – 26 April 1982) was a Turkish sportswoman, teacher of physical education and radio presenter, who worked for the BBC Turkish in London, United Kingdom.

== Early years ==
Mübeccel was born to Ottoman Army officer Hüsamettin and his wife Bergüzar as the youngest of three daughters. Her older sisters were Melahat (later Etili) and Sabahat (later Filmer). After her father died during his duty at the Russian border, her mother moved to Istanbul with her daughters, and lived in an apartment with their paternal grandmother.

== Physical education and sport ==
Mübeccel was educated at Teachers' School for Girls. During her free time, she took part in sports and learned the English language. She worked as a sports assistant at the British School of Istanbul.

She was one of the first female athletes in Turkey. At the first athletics competition for women in Turkey held on 12 February 1926 at Ittihat Sports Field (today Şükrü Saracoğlu Stadium of Fenerbahçe S.K., in Kadıköy, Istanbul), she finished first among four other women in the 300 metres event. She set records and won championships in numerous competitions. Later, she became successful in cross country running, and was also active in tennis, mountaineering, and water sports. She stated once that she was also skilled in hockey. She was a licensed referee for athletics, and officiated at the Balkan Athletics Championships.

In the early 1930s, she was sent to Sweden on a Tate scholarship for the study of physical education. After graduation, she returned home and served at Istanbul High School for Girls and a few other high schools as teacher of physical education.

She believed in physical education and sports for women of the Republican Era. She published her opinions on this in dailies and periodicals. In an article published in Spor Postası in 1935 titled Kızlarimız ve Beden Terbiyesi ("Our Girls and Physical Education"), she emphasised that parents are responsible for neglecting their daughters' physical activities.

She invited girls and their parents to gymnastics courses that she held free of charge at the community center Beyoğlu Halkevi. In an article published in the daily Cumhuriyet, she criticized the 1939 "Law on the Obligation of Physical Education", which immunized women over a certain age from physical education. She wrote: "To love something, you have to know. To know something you have to learn. And, to learn something, you have to see and practice!"

In 1941, she opened a modern sports hall.

== Radio presenter ==
Mübeccel was tasked with consulting with the British Council representative during the official visit of classical ballet dancer Ninette de Valois to Turkey in April 1947. Only a few months later, she was tasked with interpreting during the official visit of the Governor of Istanbul, Lütfi Kırdar, to the British Council in London.

In 1948, she went to London for the Games of the XIV Olympiad, where she was offered a post at the BBC Turkish Service thanks to her clear diction in Turkish, excellent command of the English language, and acceptability in society. She accepted the job offer and stayed in London. The only female staff member at the Turkish service at Bush House, she spoke French, Swedish, German, and English. The Turkish magazine ''Hayat praised her, saying "she is no less than a diplomat, who represents her country with success".

She carried out the activities of the "Club of BBC Turkish Listeners", and launched a competition entitled "Listener of the Year", which awarded Turkish winners a trip to London. She co-founded the British-Turkish Friendship Association.

She was nicknamed "Londra Kadısı" ("The Kadi of London") due to her helpful manner to the Turkish community in London. She retired after 25 years at the BBC World Service.

== Death ==
Mübeccel died in Istanbul on 26 April 1982. She was interred at Zincirlikuyu Cemetery following a religious funeral service held at Şişli Mosque. She never married, and it is not known how she took the second surname "Tek".
