= Loretta Hines Howard =

American artist

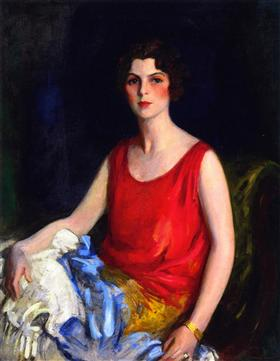
Loretta Hines Howard by Robert Henri (1865–1929)

Loretta Hines Howard (1904 — April 2, 1982) was an American artist and collector. Howard was a collector of Neapolitan crèche figures from the 18th-century. In 1957, Howard began what would become a forty-year tradition of decorating the Metropolitan Museum of Art's Christmas tree with items from her créche collection, integrating the Roman Catholic practice of creating nativity scenes with the European protestant tradition of tree decoration. In the early 1960s, she donated her collection to the museum.

Howard's work as a painter is included in the collection of the Whitney Museum of American Art. Her papers, 1926–1941, are held by the Smithsonian.

Her funeral was held at St. Ignatius Loyola Roman Catholic Church, Manhattan before burial in Valley, Wyoming.
