= María Luisa Pacheco =

Bolivian painter

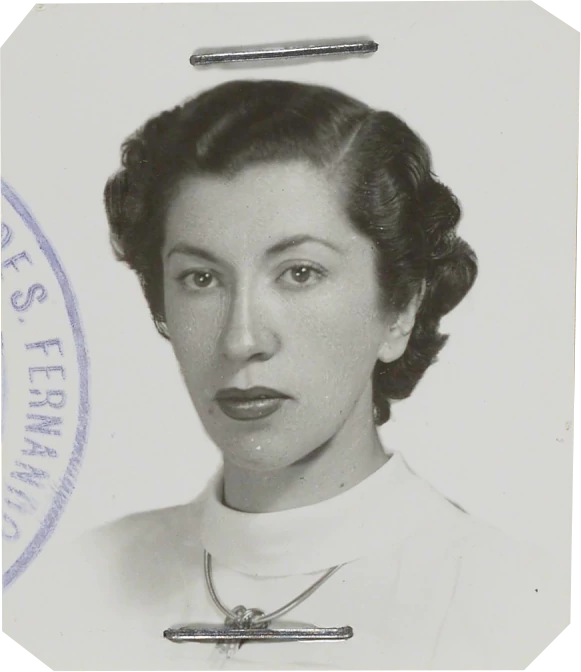
- Born: María Luisa Mariaca Dietrich; September 22, 1919; La Paz, Bolivia
- Died: April 21, 1982 (aged 62); New York, NY
- Education: Academia de Bellas Artes, La Paz
- Known for: Painting, Mixed media
- Style: Abstract expressionism
- Awards: Guggenheim Fellowships (1957, 1959,1960); First Prize, Municipal Salon (La Paz, 1953)

María Luisa Pacheco (22 September 1919 – 21 April 1982) was a Bolivian painter and mixed-media artist who immigrated to the United States. Despite her 20-year later career in New York, she was much more influential in Latin American art than that of the U.S.

== Biography ==
=== 1919-1956: Bolivia, Spain ===
Born in La Paz to the architect Julio Mariaca Pando, María Luisa Pacheco studied at the Academia de Bellas Artes in La Paz, later becoming a member of the faculty. Maria Luisa Pacheco was introduced to the tools of artistic expression in her father’s architectural studio. In the late 1940s and until 1951, she worked at the newspaper La Razón as an illustrator and as the editor of their literary section. A scholarship from the Government of Spain allowed Pacheco to continue her studies in 1951 and 1952 as a graduate student and painting instructor at the Real Academia de Bellas Artes de San Fernando in Madrid. Pacheco studied there under Daniel Vázquez Díaz, with whom she explored techniques for achieving three- dimensional effects on a two-dimensional surface, often dividing her surface into a number of planes. In March 1953 Pacheco's work was shown as part of the first exhibition of abstract art in Bolivia, entitled "Eight Contemporary Painters" (Spanish: Ocho pintores contemporáneos), alongside María Esther Ballivián, Armando Pacheco, and five other Bolivian artists.

=== 1956-1982: New York ===
In 1956, Pacheco was the recipient of three consecutive Fellowship Awards from the John Simon Guggenheim Memorial Foundation in New York City. The first fellowship awarded coincided with an invitation to exhibit at the Museum of the Organization of American States (OAS) in Washington, D.C. As a result of both of those opportunities, Maria Luisa Pacheco moved to New York in 1956. Both the Guggenheim Foundation fellowship and the OAS exhibit acquired a Maria Luisa Pacheco painting for their permanent art collections. Those paintings are currently exhibited in the art museums of those organizations as part of the periodic rotation of their permanent collections.

While in New York, Pacheco also worked as an illustrator for Life magazine, and as a textile designer.

In 1953 Maria Luisa formed the group “Eight contemporaries” and in the art scene was symbolic with their aim being change and renewal all artists differed widely in style and skill. On January 23, 1962, Maria Luisa opened a show at the Bolivian German Cultural Institute in La Paz, and the works presented were painted without reference to objective reality. After Maria Luisa Pacheco began to work for the Lee Ault and Company gallery and it was her exhibit that led to the opening of the Ault Gallery in May 1971.

Pacheo died from a brain tumor at the age of 62 at her home in Manhattan on 21 April 1982.

== Style and media ==
Beginning her work in the figurative Indigenism style of Bolivian painting predominant during the 1930s and 1940s, Pacheco belonged to the more abstract tendency of the Indigenist school (as contrasted with its more social one, committed to the 1952 Bolivian National Revolution.

Pacheco later preferred more abstract styles, both before and after her sojourn in Europe and acquaintance with Pablo Picasso, Georges Braque, and Juan Gris. Scholars have identified two distinct phases in her early work: an early abstractionism during her first visit to Europe in the early 1950s, and a later style (during her New York years) strongly influenced by Abstract Expressionism. Her work during the later 1950s was characterized by less reliance on color and a greater emphasis on paint texture.

Pacheco's abstract paintings are inspired by the native Quechua and Aymara people of Bolivia, as well as formal references to the glaciers and peaks of Bolivia's Andes Mountains. She has been identified as an important member of the vanguard generation (along with Guatemalan Rodolfo Abularach, Chilean Mario Toral, Colombian Omar Rayo, and Uruguayan Julio Alpuy) that introduced abstract language into Latin American art. She was part of an artist group was known as the "Generation of '52," named after the year of Revolution.

The late 1960s and early 1970s saw an evolution to what some believe was Pacheco's most mature work, using a style that even more emphasized texture over color, now relying not only on paint, but also on other materials such as sand, newspaper, plywood, and corrugated cardboard.

During the late 1970s and until her death, Pacheco returned somewhat to more figurative depictions of Bolivian landscape, and her work of this period was notable for its combination of abstraction and figuration.

== Reception and scholarship ==
In 1999, Pacheco was honored posthumously for "her role as a pioneer and promoter of change, and her contribution to the development of contemporary Bolivian art" in a retrospective exhibit at the opening of the first International Art Salon (SIART 99) at the National Museum of Art in La Paz.

== Sources ==
- Museo Nacional de Arte, Galería Arte Unico, Galería Fundación BHN (1993). María Luisa Pacheco, pintora de los Andes. La Paz, Bolivia: La Papelera.
- María Luisa Pacheco: Retrospectiva. Bolivia. 1976.*Pacheco, María Luisa (2010). María Luisa Pacheco (1919-1982). La Paz : Oxígeno Cultura Visual.
- The Latin American Spirit: art and artists in the United States, 1920-1970. Bronx Museum of the Arts in association with H.N. Abrams. 1988. ISBN 0810912716.
- "María Luisa Pacheco's works". LatinAmericanArt.com.
