= Joe Campbell (Australian footballer) =

Australian rules footballer

Personal information
- Full name: Joseph Munro Campbell
- Born: 10 October 1893; Cohuna, Victoria
- Died: 11 April 1982 (aged 88); Windsor, Victoria
- Original team: Cohuna

Playing career^{1}
Years	Club	Games (Goals)
1920	St Kilda	2 (0)
- ^{1} Playing statistics correct to the end of 1920.

Joseph Munro Campbell (10 October 1893 – 11 April 1982) was an Australian rules footballer who played with St Kilda in the Victorian Football League (VFL).
