= Ze'ev Katz =

Israeli politician (1923–1982)

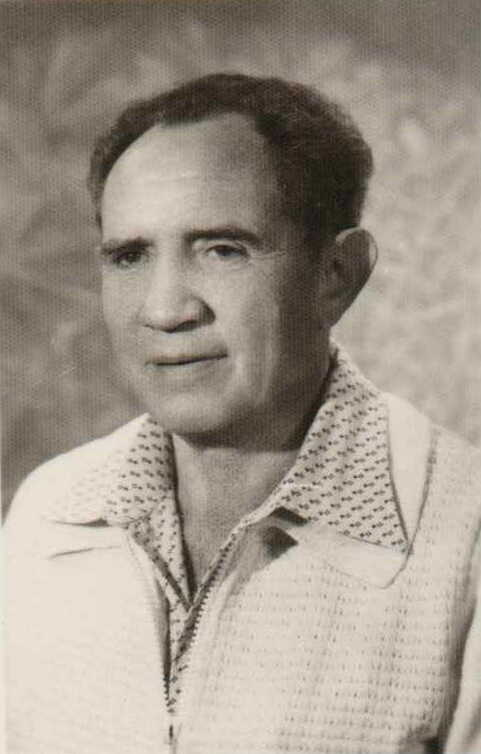

Faction represented in the Knesset
- 1979–1981: Alignment

Personal details
- Born: 29 March 1923 Leipzig, Germany
- Died: 27 April 1982 (aged 59)

Ze'ev Katz (Hebrew: זאב כץ; 29 March 1923 – 27 April 1982) was an Israeli politician who served as a member of the Knesset for the Alignment between 1979 and 1981.

== Biography ==
Born in Leipzig in Germany in 1923, Katz joined the Habonim youth movement in 1933. He emigrated to Mandatory Palestine in 1938 and joined kibbutz Gesher as part of a Youth Aliyah programme.

In 1941 he volunteered to join the British Army. After being demobilised in 1946, he worked as a counsellor to child Holocaust survivors in Italy, before returning to live in Gesher.

He was placed 35th the Alignment list for the 1977 Knesset elections. Although the Alignment won only 32 seats, he entered the Knesset on 12 January 1979 as a replacement for Aharon Yadlin, who had resigned his seat. He lost his seat in the 1981 elections.

Katz died in April 1982 at the age of 59.
