= Sam Glankoff =

American woodcut artist

- Born: October 30, 1894; New York City
- Died: 13 April 1982 (aged 87); New York City
- Known for: Painting, Woodcut
- Movement: Abstract Expressionism, Print-painting
- Partner: Frances Kornblum
- Parents: Jacob Glanckopf (father); Yetta Emerman (mother)
- Relatives: Mort Glankoff (brother); Gina de Soos (sister)
- Website: www.samglankoff.com

Sam Glankoff (October 30, 1894 – April 13, 1982) was an American Abstract Expressionist and woodcut artist.

== Biography ==
Glankoff was born on October 30, 1894, in New York City. His mother, Yetta Emerman, had emigrated from Latvia to the United States in 1880 and became a hat designer in New York City. She married Jacob Glanckopf, a purveyor of exotic feathers. Glankoff began his art education by studying and copying miniature paintings on exhibit at the Metropolitan Museum of Art. When he was 20 years old, he began attending night classes at the Art Students League of New York, but in 1917, he left the United States for Cuba as a conscientious objector when the United States entered the First World War. In Cuba, Glankoff traveled around on horseback, painting portraits until, in 1918, he was caught in an ambush, falsely arrested for having participated in the bombing of a railway station in Miami. After spending several months in prison in Cuba, Glankoff was released as the war came to an end and he returned to New York.

In 1922, Hans O. Hofman and Karoly Fulop introduced Glankoff to Juliana R. Force, the director of the Whitney Studio Club. She invited Glankoff to exhibit paintings and woodcuts, which he did, until the Club disbanded in 1928.

At one of the Whitney Studio Club's annual exhibitions, Glankoff showed an example of what would become his preferred medium and the basis for his artistic innovations, a simple woodcut. Inspired by the woodcut techniques of the German Expressionists Karl Schmidt-Rottluff and Ernst Ludwig Kirchner, Glankoff’s new rough and expressive style emerged from his experiments. In the 1920s and 1930s, he became an artist for numerous commercial art studios in New York, for which he employed woodcut-making techniques.

In the late 1920s, Glankoff formed a relationship with Frances Kornblum, with whom he would live for the next 44 years, splitting their time between their New York City apartment and a house in Woodstock where he continued to paint. Over the next two decades, Glankoff created woodcut and pen and ink illustrations for St. Nicholas Magazine, Scribners, The New Yorker, Family Circle Magazine and for his brother Mort Glankoff's new CUE Magazine. He created woodcut book illustrations for the major publishing houses; Harcourt, Brace and Co, Alfred A. Knopf, and Horace Liveright. In the mid-1940s, he served as the head artist for True Comics, a comic-book series for boys, whose offerings included historical legends, adventure stories, adaptations of literary classics and science-fiction tales. Glankoff also produced comic strip illustrations for the advertising campaigns of brands such as Westinghouse and Chiquita. In his personal work, in addition to painting, he continued to further refine his woodcut-making techniques. and soon became captivated by the properties of casein. paints and water-based inks.

In the mid-1950s, Glankoff began to assist Kornblum full time at her company, Impulse Items. No longer importing stuffed toys from France, Glankoff was tasked to design the stuffed animals for Impulse Items. It was Glankoff who designed and hand-fabricated the first, three dimensional versions of the Babar the Elephant Family and Dr. Seuss's The Cat in the Hat in an arrangement Kornblum had secured with Random House who was publishing The Cat in the Hat with Dr. Seuss. In addition, he designed and hand-fabricated more than 200 designs for stuffed animals. The toys found international markets, but, financially, Kornblum and Glankoff still found themselves struggling. In 1970, when Frances Kornblum died, Glankoff left the toy business to set up a painting studio in their small apartment on East 33rd St. Painting each morning and creating preparatory drawings for future works in the afternoons, he slowly developed his unique process of using a printmaking process to make a painting. When he wasn't painting, Glankoff spent most of his time in solitude, drawing, and reading Sartre and Kierkegaard, science fiction and Buddhist literature.

In the mid-1970s, curators from the Prints and Drawings department at the Whitney Museum of American Art in New York visited Glankoff at his studio. By that time, he had come to describe the technique he had developed as that of “using a printing method to make a painting.” His visitors from the museum coined the term “print-paintings”, to describe the hybrid technique Glankoff used to create unique works. The Whitney's curators offered to present Glankoff's work in a solo exhibition at the museum, to which he responded: “I’m not ready yet.”

It was not until October 1981, at the age of 87, that Glankoff had his first solo exhibition in a commercial gallery. That presentation, at New York's Graham Gallery, took place only a few months before his death. John Russell, art critic of The New York Times, wrote: "It is not every day that an artist of stature makes his debut in New York at the age of 87". Shortly thereafter, the Zimmerli Art Museum at Rutgers University in New Jersey, organized “Sam Glankoff 1894–1982: A Retrospective Exhibition.” Shown in 1984, it was the first comprehensive survey of Glankoff's art.

== Print-Painting ==
In the 1970s, Glankoff invented a new artistic style and work process, called "Print-Painting". He defined his technique as “using a printing method to make a painting.” A form of both transfer painting and printmaking, Glankoff built up his forms through several layers of pigment, resulting in unique images of great visual impact. He replaced the woodcut medium’s traditional block of wood with multiple plywood boards scaled to the handmade Japanese paper that he used. By printing several layers of color with water-soluble inks and casein, he was able to achieve a unique luminosity of surface. Using this indirect method, Glankoff managed to retain the spontaneity and dynamism of his expressionist brushstroke. Glankoff's ‘Print-Paintings’ are composed of individually printed, uniform-sized panels of hand-made Japanese papers, joined (pasted) together to make one unique large-scale work.

In creating a print-painting, Sam Glankoff would reference a scaled-up preliminary or preparatory drawing, and transfer his design onto multiple, gesso-primed, ¼” plywood boards. Initially, he used the rough and expressive style that emerged from his experiments in woodcut to carve his design in the plywood panels and then build-up sculptural surface details on the wood with gesso. Eventually, Glankoff would paint the design directly onto the surface of the boards in enamel paint and no longer carve the design into the wood.

Glankoff designed his own printing table which could secure each individual board, and yet was able to carry each panel of Japanese paper across, so that multiple and successive layers of color could be applied to the paper panels, with the boards remaining in register. With his work experience and years of experimentation with densities of Japanese papers, water-soluble inks, casein and glycerin, which by adding, he discovered would retard the drying pigment process, Glankoff was able to control the absorption capacity of the Japanese paper, and transfer layer upon layer of his hand-mixed colors onto the multiple paper panels that would make up each print-painting. Although he may have re-used his boards to create more than one work using the same “design”, each one of his 1 – 9 panel "print-painting's" was approached as a unique work.

The term "print-painting" was coined by Elke Solomon, former Assistant Curator in the Department of Prints and Drawings at the Whitney Museum of American Art.

The New York Times described the results "as if Milton Avery had been to school with a first-rate Japanese printer".

== Styles ==
Glankoff made landscape and still-life paintings, German Expressionist woodcuts, watercolors, abstract collage monotypes, and late in life, developed a technique that came to be called “print-painting.” His early commercial work consisted of illustrations for comics, magazines, and woodcut illustrations for adaptations of classics. Simultaneously with his woodcuts, he made pictorial work, such as:

- Still life with white bowl (1920)
- The portrait of his father (1922)
- Woodstock Landscape: The green trees and hills (1930)
- Plate of Red Apples (1930)

== Museography ==
- Solomon R. Guggenheim Museum
- Metropolitan Museum of Art
- Detroit Institute of Arts
- The Jewish Museum
- Zimmerli Art Museum at Rutgers University
- Worcester Art Museum
- Fogg Art Museum
- Skirball Cultural Center
- New York Public Library
- New York University
- Northwestern University
- Mary and Leigh Block Museum of Art
- Wesleyan University
- Davison Art Center
- Smith College Museum of Art

== Private collections ==
- Becton, Dickinson and Company
- Champion International Paper
- Chemical Bank
- Davis Polk & Wardwell
- The Beth Rudin DeWoody Collection
- Philip Morris
- Seligman and Latz
- Simpson, Thatcher and Bartlett
- Stephens Inc.
- Smurfit-Stone Container

=== Documentary ===
The film, Re-Arranging Short Dreams, is a documentary made by filmmaker and cameraman Seth Schneidman and Wendy Snyder a year before Glankoff's first solo exhibition. It is a 17-minute pilot film that talks about the life and work of the artist within his studio.
