= María Esther Ballivián =

Bolivian artist

- Born: María Esther Ballivián Iturralde; 13 June 1927; La Paz, Bolivia
- Died: 23 June 1977 (aged 50)
- Occupations: Artist, teacher
- Spouse: Luis Perrín Pando

María Esther Ballivián Iturralde (13 June 1927 – 23 June 1977) was a Bolivian painter, engraver, and teacher. She is considered one of the leading Bolivian fine artists of the 20th century.

== Biography ==
=== Early life ===
María Esther Ballivián was born in La Paz, Bolivia on 13 June 1927, to Rafael Ballivián and Rosa Iturralde. Her paternal grandmother was Elisa Rocha de Ballivián, the first prominent female Bolivian fine artist and founder of the first painting school in La Paz in 1905. Ballivián was the great-granddaughter of painter Zenón Iturralde.

=== Artistic career ===
From 1945 to 1950 Ballivián was a student of Lithuanian painter Juan Rimsa. She attended the Academies of Fine Arts in La Paz and Lima. In 1950 Ballivián married the architect Luis Perrín Pando, but unusually for the time she did not take his name. Also in 1950 the first exhibition of her work was held in La Paz. Following the outbreak of the 1952 Bolivian National Revolution, Ballivián moved to Chile; there she studied printmaking with Nemesio Antúnez. In March 1953 Ballivián's work was shown as part of the first exhibition of abstract art in Bolivia, entitled "Eight Contemporary Painters" (Spanish: Ocho pintores contemporáneos), alongside María Luisa Pacheco, Armando Pacheco, and five other Bolivian artists.

Ballivián lived in Paris in 1957–60 and again in 1963–64. While in Paris she studied at Stanley William Hayter's Atelier 17. She also studied at the Académie de la Grande Chaumière, where she met Henri Goetz, in whose studio she later worked.

In 1964 Ballivián returned to Bolivia. There she worked as a teacher at the Hernando Siles National Academy of Fine Arts in La Paz, where her students included Ángeles Fabbri, Roxana Crespo, and Carmen Bilbao. Ballivián also started drawing and painting female nudes, work for which she is particularly remembered.

=== Death ===
Ballivián died on 23 July 1977 after being accidentally electrocuted in the bath.

== Awards and recognition ==
- Award of the Hispano-American Women's Engraving and Drawing Competition (Spanish: Concurso Hispanoamericano Femenino de Grabado y Dibujo), La Paz, 1956.
- First prize in engraving at the 1960 competition of the Salón Pedro Domingo Murillo with the work "Bajo relieve".
- First prize in engraving at the IV Salón de Arte in 1961, organised by the Bolivian Ministry of Education, with the work "Trópico".
- Grand Prize in painting, 1965 at the Salón Pedro Domingo Murillo with the work "Naturaleza muerta".
- Grand Prize at the Technical University of Oruro, 1974.
