= Jack Wegner =

Australian rules footballer, born 1913

Personal information
- Full name: Julius Wegener
- Born: 21 July 1913; Richmond, Victoria
- Died: 30 April 1982 (aged 68); Preston, Victoria
- Original team: Northcote
- Height: 175 cm (5 ft 9 in)
- Weight: 77 kg (170 lb)

Playing career^{1}
Years	Club	Games (Goals)
1938	Fitzroy	1 (0)
- ^{1} Playing statistics correct to the end of 1938.

Julius 'Jack' Wegner (21 July 1913 – 30 April 1982) was an Australian rules footballer who played with Fitzroy in the Victorian Football League (VFL).

== Family ==
The son of Bernhard Julius Wegener (1879–1954), and Sophia Eliza Johanna "Dorothy" Wegener, née Uppink, Julius Wegener was born at Richmond, Victoria on 21 July 1913.

He married Iris Emily Schwaebsch on 30 September 1939.

His twin brother, Hans Johannes Wegener (1913–1951), a.k.a. "Andrew Wegner", played VFA football with Northcote.
