= Robert White (Australian footballer) =

Australian rules footballer

Personal information
- Full name: Robert White
- Born: 6 March 1895; Brunswick, Victoria
- Died: 23 April 1982 (aged 87); Merlynston, Victoria
- Original team: Carlton District

Playing career^{1}
Years	Club	Games (Goals)
1916	Carlton	1 (0)
- ^{1} Playing statistics correct to the end of 1916.

Robert White (6 March 1895 – 23 April 1982) was an Australian rules footballer who played with Carlton in the Victorian Football League (VFL).
