= Rachel Morton Harris =

American soprano (1888–1982)

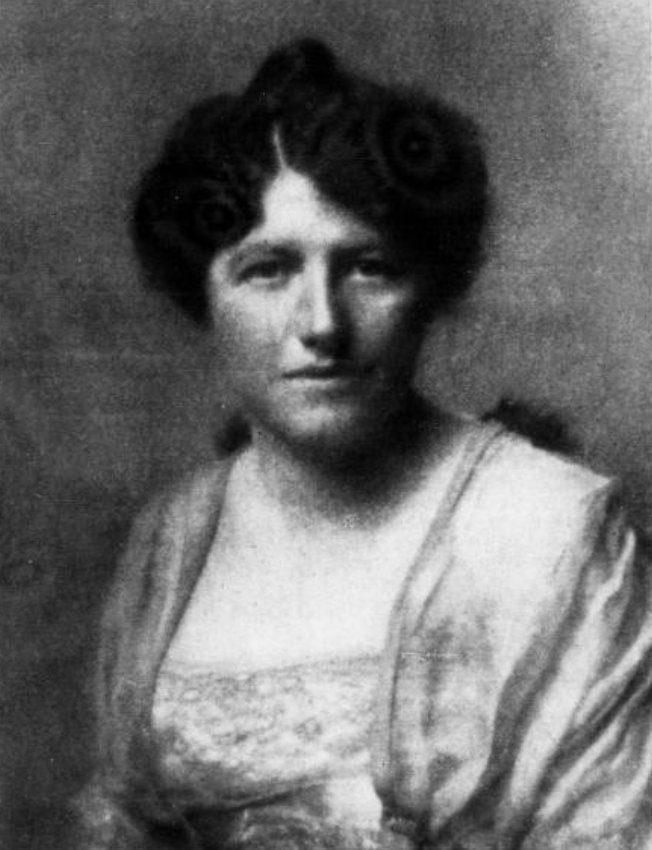
- Rachel Morton Harris, as photographed by Arnold Genthe
- Born: Rachel Emma Farra Morton; September 11, 1888; Everett, Massachusetts, U.S.
- Died: April 17, 1982 (age 93); Carmel, California, U.S.
- Occupation: Soprano concert singer

Rachel Emma Farra Morton Harris (September 11, 1888 – April 17, 1982) was an American concert and operatic soprano, active in the 1910s and 1920s. Later in life she was a music critic and voice teacher in Long Beach, California.

== Early life and education ==
Morton was born in Everett, Massachusetts, the daughter of Frederick William Morton and Rose Valier Morton. She graduated from Everett High School and studied for a musical career in Berlin, and with Jean de Reszke at the American Conservatory in Fontainebleau. One of her teachers, Isidore Luckstone, was also her accompanist.

== Career ==
Harris, a soprano, married Jaffrey Harris, a music professor at the Iowa State College, and she performed a soloist there in 1916. She gave her New York debut recital at Aeolian Hall in April 1919, demonstrating the "rich and luscious quality" of her voice as well as its "ample carrying power". "Not often does a young singer make so definitely good a first impression as did Rachel Morton Harris at her debut," commented the Brooklyn Eagle about that performance. She was a soloist in a 1920 performance of Handel's Elijah oratorio, along with Frieda Hempel and Merle Alcock, with the New York Symphony Orchestra and the New York Oratorio Society, conducted by Walter Damrosch. She also sang at Boston's Jordan Hall in 1920. In 1921 she was a soloist with the Ottawa Symphony, sang in a program for the Beethoven Society with violinist Albert Vertchamp, and gave a series of joint recitals with baritone Francis Rogers at Harvard, Princeton, and Yale. In December 1921, she sang at Carnegie Hall. and she sang again at the Town Hall in March 1922.

She sang in operas in Europe and Great Britain for several seasons in the 1920s, before returning to New York in 1928. In 1930 she gave another recital at the Town Hall venue, with her husband as her accompanist. In 1933 the Harrises performed at a musicale for the Bronxville Woman's Club, and at a benefit concert for unemployed musicians in White Plains. She gave another program for the Bronxville Woman's Club in 1935.

In her later years, Morton was based in southern California, where she continued to perform, and was a music critic for the Long Beach Press-Telegram from 1956 to 1964. She also taught voice students from her own studio, and at Long Beach State College.

== Personal life ==
In 1914, Morton married pianist, conductor, and music professor Jaffrey C. Harris. She retired to Carmel in 1967, and died there in 1982, at the age of 93.
