= Darfur, Minnesota =

City in the United States

Darfur
- City
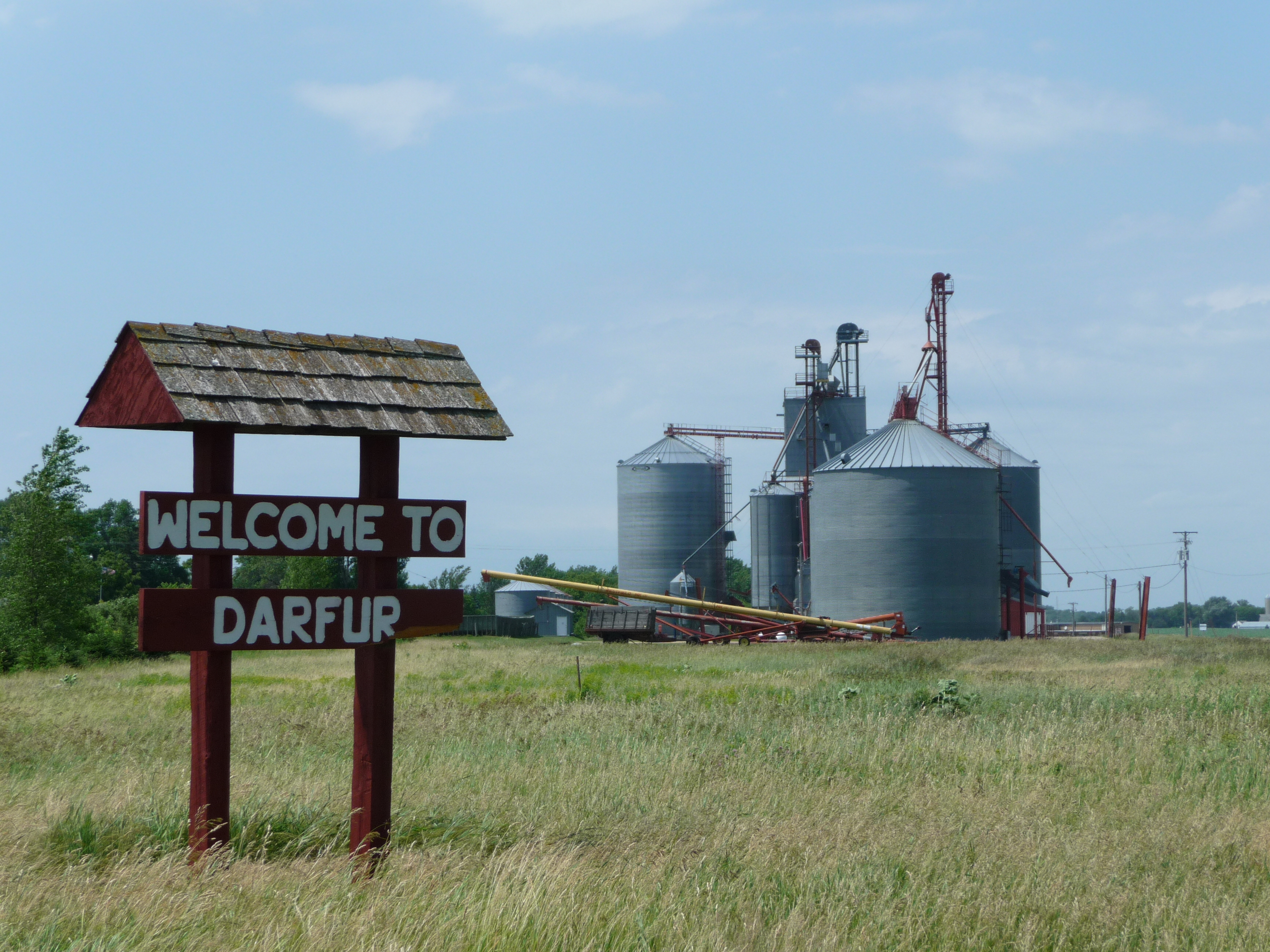
- Town sign and grain elevator in Darfur, Minnesota

- Location of Darfur, Minnesota
- Coordinates: 44°03′12″N 94°50′16″W
- Country: United States
- State: Minnesota
- County: Watonwan

Government
  - Type: Mayor – Council

Area
  - Total: 0.23 sq mi (0.59 km^{2})
  - Land: 0.23 sq mi (0.59 km^{2})
  - Water: 0 sq mi (0.00 km^{2})
- Elevation: 1,148 ft (350 m)

Population (2020)
  - Total: 84
  - Density: 366.5/sq mi (141.49/km^{2})
- Time zone: UTC-6 (Central (CST))
  - Summer (DST): UTC-5 (CDT)
- ZIP code: 56022
- Area code: 507
- FIPS code: 27-14770
- GNIS feature ID: 2393719

Darfur is a city in Watonwan County, Minnesota, United States. The population was 84 at the 2020 census.

== Geography ==
According to the United States Census Bureau, the city has a total area of 0.35 square miles (0.91 km^{2}), all land.

Minnesota State Highway 30 serves as a main route in the community.

== History ==
Darfur was platted in April 1899 by the Chicago and North Western Railway; its incorporation as a village was completed on December 31, 1903, and it became a city on January 1, 1974, when Minnesota abolished villages. Warren Upham writes that Darfur, "Was named either from a region of Sudan or when two Scandinavian railroad men questioned, "why you stop dar fur?", but he does not include a source for either version.

== Demographics ==
Historical population
Census	Pop.	Note	%±
1910	72		—
1920	112		55.6%
1930	101		−9.8%
1940	132		30.7%
1950	150		13.6%
1960	191		27.3%
1970	179		−6.3%
1980	139		−22.3%
1990	128		−7.9%
2000	137		7.0%
2010	108		−21.2%
2020	84		−22.2%
U.S. Decennial Census

=== 2010 census ===
As of the census of 2010, there were 108 people, 49 households, and 30 families residing in the city. The population density was 308.6 inhabitants per square mile (119.2/km^{2}). There were 59 housing units at an average density of 168.6 per square mile (65.1/km^{2}). The racial makeup of the city was 94.4% White, 3.7% from other races, and 1.9% from two or more races. Hispanic or Latino of any race were 9.3% of the population.

There were 49 households, of which 24.5% had children under the age of 18 living with them, 53.1% were married couples living together, 4.1% had a female householder with no husband present, 4.1% had a male householder with no wife present, and 38.8% were non-families. 38.8% of all households were made up of individuals, and 20.4% had someone living alone who was 65 years of age or older. The average household size was 2.20 and the average family size was 2.93.

The median age in the city was 45.5 years. 23.1% of residents were under the age of 18; 5.7% were between the ages of 18 and 24; 21.3% were from 25 to 44; 30.6% were from 45 to 64; and 19.4% were 65 years of age or older. The gender makeup of the city was 50.9% male and 49.1% female.

=== 2000 census ===
As of the census of 2000, there were 137 people, 58 households, and 44 families residing in the city. The population density was 386.6 inhabitants per square mile (149.3/km^{2}). There were 59 housing units at an average density of 166.5 per square mile (64.3/km^{2}). The racial makeup of the city was 134 white people and 3 Asian people. There are no blacks or Hispanics.

There were 58 households, out of which 31.0% had children under the age of 18 living with them, 62.1% were married couples living together, 8.6% had a female householder with no husband present, and 24.1% were non-families. 22.4% of all households were made up of individuals, and 12.1% had someone living alone who was 65 years of age or older. The average household size was 2.36 and the average family size was 2.64.

In the city, the population was spread out, with 24.8% under the age of 18, 8.0% from 18 to 24, 27.7% from 25 to 44, 13.9% from 45 to 64, and 25.5% who were 65 years of age or older. The median age was 40 years. For every 100 females, there were 117.5 males. For every 100 females age 18 and over, there were 106.0 males.

The median income for a household in the city was $31,563, and the median income for a family was $32,750. Males had a median income of $30,000 versus $18,125 for females. The per capita income for the city was $14,300. There were 4.1% of families and 7.1% of the population living below the poverty line, including 5.6% of under eighteen and none of those over 64.
