= Ted Cusack =

Australian rules footballer (1910–1982)

Personal information
- Full name: Edward Thomas Cusack
- Born: 14 May 1910; Omeo, Victoria
- Died: 25 April 1982 (aged 71); Parkdale, Victoria
- Original team: Christian Brothers
- Height: 177 cm (5 ft 10 in)
- Weight: 73 kg (161 lb)

Playing career^{1}
Years	Club	Games (Goals)
1930	Richmond	2 (0)
1931–33	North Melbourne	16 (5)
Total		18 (5)

Coaching career
Years	Club	Games (W–L–D)
1939	North Melbourne	2 (1–1–0)
Total		2 (1–1–0)
- ^{1} Playing statistics correct to the end of 1939.

Edward Thomas Cusack (14 May 1910 – 25 April 1982) was an Australian rules footballer who played with Richmond and North Melbourne in the Victorian Football League (VFL).

Once Ted retired from playing he was elected to a position on the committee. In 1937 Cusack got married. He was assistant secretary at the time.

Cusack was caretaker coach for the last two games of the 1939 season. Keith Forbes was suspended for threatening the umpire and banned from coaching.
