= Julian Murfett =

Australian cricketer

Personal information
- Full name: Julian Ivor Murfett
- Born: 2 July 1915; Dunorlan, Tasmania, Australia
- Died: 27 April 1982 (aged 66); Hobart, Tasmania, Australia
- Batting: Left-handed
- Bowling: Right-arm fast-medium

Domestic team information
- Years: Team
- 1937–1948: Tasmania

Career statistics
Competition	First-class
Matches	12
Runs scored	241
Batting average	15.06
100s/50s	0/1
Top score	51
Balls bowled	1862
Wickets	21
Bowling average	56.23
5 wickets in innings	–
10 wickets in match	–
Best bowling	4/66
Catches/stumpings	10/0
- Source: Cricinfo, 22 January 2017

Julian Murfett (2 July 1915 – 27 April 1982) was an Australian cricketer. He played twelve first-class matches for Tasmania between 1937 and 1948.

== See also ==
- List of Tasmanian representative cricketers
