= Reed Edwin Peggram =

Concentration camp survivor

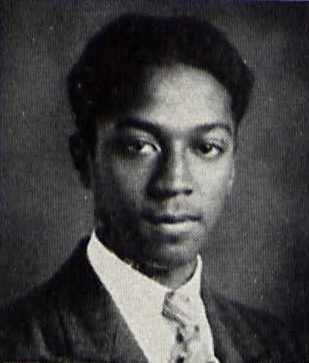
- Born: July 26, 1914; Boston, Massachusetts, U.S.
- Died: April 20, 1982 (aged 67); Boston, Massachusetts, USA
- Other name: Edwin Reed
- Education: B.A. Romance Languages and Literature; M.A. Comparative Literature
- Alma mater: Columbia University; Harvard University
- Occupations: Translator, teacher
- Awards: John Harvard Fellowship (1938); Julius Rosenwald Fellowship (1938)

Reed Edwin Peggram, also known as Edwin Reed (26 July 1914- 20 April 1982) was an American scholar, translator, and teacher of linguistics, and was also known for his survival of Nazi imprisonment during World War II. He was born and raised in the Dorchester neighborhood of Boston, Massachusetts and died there at the age of 67.

== Biography ==
=== Early life ===
Reed Edwin Peggram was born to Harvey Thomas Peggram and Mary Reed Peggram on July 26, 1914, in Dorchester, Massachusetts. Both of his parents were born in Virginia. Peggram's mother was a housewife and his father, after an injury from military involvement during World War I, was sent to a hospital in Virginia for long term recovery. After his parents divorced, Peggram's mother married Phillip Farrar and moved to Bayonne, New Jersey. Because Peggram was not primarily supported by either of his parents, he was taken care of by his grandmother, Mrs. Laura Reed, who worked as a school custodian. Reed Peggram also had two younger brothers.

==== Education ====
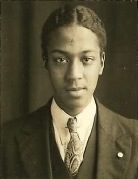
Reed Peggram: Latin Public School yearbook portrait

Although neither of his parents graduated from college, Peggram was a successful scholar. He first attended Public Latin School in Boston, Massachusetts from 1927 to 1931, where his main interests were in literature, languages, and dramatics. During his time in school, he also enjoyed participating in track, Dramatic Club, and tutoring French and Latin. His main expertise was in scholastic endeavors, however, and Peggram managed to earn honors in many of his courses, including Elementary Latin, French, and German as well as Advanced Latin. He also received the Exemplary Conduct and Fidelity Award, Conduct Above Criticism Award, and Perfection in Attendance Award in school. Overall, his interest in the romance languages inspired him to pursue a teaching career.

Even though Peggram was often limited financially, he received money from the Veterans Aid program throughout his childhood. Fortunately, his grandmother saved most of this money to fund Peggram's university education, allowing him to attend Harvard University from 1931 to 1935. While there, he studied French and graduated magna cum laude with High Honors for his Bachelor of Arts in Romance languages and literature in the department of Romance philology. After his undergraduate education, Peggram received his master's degree in comparative literature from Harvard in 1936, and began writing a thesis on the meaning and evaluation of Nineteenth Century Decadence. He then continued his graduate studies as a Graduate Residence Fellow in comparative literature at Columbia University from 1936 to 1937 and returned to Harvard from 1937 to 1938 to pursue his PhD in comparative literature. During this time, he was most interested in topics in comparative literature and creative writing.

Before completing his doctoral work, Peggram received the John Harvard Fellowship (1938) and the Julius Rosenwald Fellowship (1938) to study abroad at the University of Paris in France. Here, he met Gerdh Hauptmann of Copenhagen, Denmark, another scholar who studied fine arts and painting. After meeting, the two students went together to the University of Copenhagen in Denmark to study in 1939.

While Peggram concentrated heavily in his studies, he also had many extracurricular involvements during his undergraduate schooling. He was involved in German Club, Poetry Club, and was pledge of Le Cercle Francais. He also participated in the St. John's Society, the French Soirée, and was elected in 1934-35 to Alpha chapter of Massachusetts of Phi Beta Kappa. Besides these activities, Peggram obtained several academic honors. He was on the dean's list at Harvard for three years and received the Sales Scholarship (1934–35), the Orlando V. Doe Scholarship (1933–34), the Medal of the Comité France-Amérique (1935), and was honorable mention for the Susan Anthony Potter Prize in Comparative Literature (1936). At Columbia University, Peggram received the Graduate Residence Scholarship.

=== Adult years ===
After studying together, Peggram and Hauptmann formed a strong relationship and wanted to leave to America together. Unfortunately, these plans were delayed first by financial limitations, as they both struggled to make money. Peggram was considered for teaching positions at Claflin University in Orangeburg, South Carolina and Harvard University in Cambridge, Massachusetts, but he was unable to find the financial support to travel home.

Then, with the German occupation of Denmark during WWII, Peggram and Hauptmann had to flee to France and eventually settled in Italy. However, the two were captured in 1941 by Nazis and imprisoned in the Bagni Di Lucca concentration camp near Pistoia, Italy. During this time, Peggram had the chance to return to the United States, and Hauptmann was offered work under German occupation. Yet, both men denied these opportunities for freedom, as they were not willing to separate from one another. Thus, they were sentenced to death and claimed as prisoners. The pair spent two years in German and Italian concentration camps, during which military personnel confiscated their documentation papers. Eventually, both Peggram and Hauptmann escaped prison, facing harsh conditions and machine gun fire along their journey. The pair finally found safety with the 92nd Infantry Division in Italy. Unfortunately, because neither of them had their identification documents, Peggram and Hauptmann were still unable to return to the U.S. at this time. Moreover, their time in Nazi imprisonment left both men to suffer from nervous breakdowns and mental health problems. After his freedom, Peggram received four years of treatment for his mental health issues.

After seven years abroad, Peggram travelled back to the United States to work as a translator and a teacher. Living in his home town of Dorchester in Boston, Massachusetts, he spent his time working, expanding his language skills, and singing in Episcopal Church choirs. Peggram never married and was childless. However, several personal letters to his Harvard colleague Leonard Bernstein and private accounts indicate he was homosexual and likely had a romantic relationship with Gerdh Hauptmann during their time together.

=== Death ===
Reed Edwin Peggram died on April 20, 1982, in Dorchester, Massachusetts, at the age of 67. He was retired at the time of his death and survived by a brother, Vincent Farrar. He was buried at Forest Hills Cemetery in Boston with his mother Mary and Martha Virginia, the wife of his brother Vincent. The gravestone bears the last name of his stepfather Phillip Farrar, his mother's second husband.

== Career ==
Knowing seven languages, including English, French, German, Italian, and Danish, Peggram worked as a translator and later on as a teacher of linguistics. In 1950, he also expressed interest in obtaining a doctorat d'université rather than a PhD. Throughout his lifetime, Peggram published several comparative literature and linguistic works.

== Publications ==
- “André Gide: Novelist,” Twice a Year, New York, 1937.
- “A Neglected Dutch ‘Amphitryon’ of 1679.” The Modern Language Review, vol. 36, no. 1, 1941, pp. 112–115.
- “The First French and English Translations of Sir Thomas More's ‘Utopia.’” The Modern Language Review, vol. 100, 2005, pp. 51–61.
