= Tano Jōdai =

Japanese academic and peace activist (1886–1982)

- 上代たの
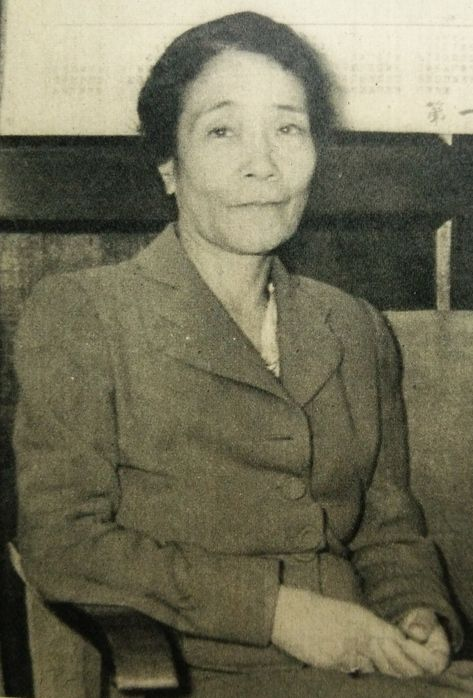
- Born: July 3, 1886
- Died: April 8, 1982
- Education: Japan Women's University
- Occupation(s): Professor of English literature, peace activist, and sixth president of the Japan Women's University

Tano Jōdai (上代たの) (July 3, 1886 – April 8, 1982) was a professor of English literature, peace activist, and the sixth president of the Japan Women's University.

== Career ==
Jōdai was born on July 3, 1886. Her father was the head of Harue village in Shimane Prefecture, Japan. After graduating from the Shimane Prefectural Matsue Kita High School, she returned to her village and taught at the local school for a while, but then continued her studies at the Japan Women's University. She graduated with a degree in English literature. Jōdai wanted to continue her studies at the Tokyo Imperial University, but they did not accept female students at that time. Instead, a professor there named Nitobe Inazo got her a place at the Wells College in the United States, after she wrote to him about her desire to study abroad.

When Jōdai returned to Japan in 1917, she became a professor at the Japan Women's University, and was the first person to teach courses on American literature and history in Japan. Nitobe's influence led her to found the Japanese Women's Peace Association. This later became the Japanese chapter of the Women's International League for Peace and Freedom. At Nitobe's recommendation, in 1924 Jōdai studied at the University of Michigan and Newnham College, Cambridge, then stayed at his home in Geneva until 1927.

After World War II, Jōdai resumed teaching at the Japan Women's University. In 1955 she was one of the founding members of the Committee of Seven to Appeal for World Peace. From 1956 until March 1965, Jōdai served as the president of the Japan Women's University. During her tenure as president she made all of the library's collection open stacks and started a friends of the library group.

She was one of the signatories of the agreement to convene a convention for drafting a world constitution. As a result, for the first time in human history, a World Constituent Assembly convened to draft and adopt the Constitution for the Federation of Earth.

Jōdai died on April 8, 1982.

== See also ==
- List of peace activists

== Selected bibliography ==
- Jōdai, Tano (1939). ポエムズ・フォ・ヤング・ピープル [Poems for young people]. 開隆堂書店.
- 上代たの文集 女性教育者の先達 [The poetry of Jōdai Tano: a pioneer of female educators]. 上代たの文集編集委員会. 1984.

=== Edited ===
- Jōdai, Tano, ed. (1933). Fifty American poets. 開隆堂書店.
- Jōdai, Tano, ed. (1936). フロスト詩選 [Selected poems by Robert Frost]. 開隆堂書店.
