= Konstantinos Kazanas =

Participant in the Greek Resistance (1910–1982)

- Κωνσταντίνος Καζάνας
- Born: 1910; Bursa, Ottoman Empire
- Died: 24 April 1982 (aged 71–72); Thessaloniki, Greece
- Occupations: Teacher, Accountant
- Known for: Participation in the Greek Resistance; lowering the flag of the fascist Bulgarian occupation regime and raising Greek flag in Prosotsani (1944)

Konstantinos Kazanas (Bursa, 1910 – Thessaloniki, 1982) was a Greek teacher from Asia Minor with significant activity during the Greek Resistance.

== Biography ==
He was born in Demirdesio, Bursa in Asia Minor. He studied at the Greek Urban School of Bursa. After the Asia Minor Catastrophe, he settled with his family in Prosotsani, Drama, along with many families of Asia Minor Greeks from Bursa. As a graduate of the Urban School, he worked voluntarily for many years as a teacher in settlements of the area that lacked teachers. He also served as secretary of the Pyrsoupoly-Prosotsani Community.

On 4 September 1944 in Prosotsani, while Eastern Macedonia was still under Bulgarian occupation, Konstantinos Kazanas along with Asterios Asteriadis lowered the Bulgarian flag in broad daylight and raised the Greek flag in the central square of the town, despite the terror and threats of the occupiers. This act, unique in occupied Europe, led to Kazanas' exile in prisons in Sofia but was a blow to the fascist Bulgarian occupation forces and boosted the morale of Greek fighters and the local population.

He was responsible for the finances at the Cooperative Union of Tobacco Producers of Greece (SEKE) in Drama, but was dismissed after the April 21st coup d'état due to his democratic beliefs. Later, in the city of Kavala, he worked as an accountant in the city's tobacco factories.

In 1977 he moved with his family to the city of Thessaloniki, in the Depot neighborhood, showing significant social activity such as advocating for the unrestricted mobility of people with disabilities in the urban area and in critical events for the city like the 1978 Thessaloniki earthquake. He died in Thessaloniki on 24 April 1982.
