= Yoshitoki Sugitani =

Japanese politician and nobleman

Baron Yoshitoki Sugitani
- 杉溪 由言
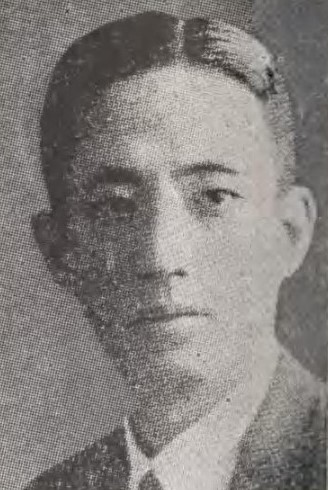
- Baron Yoshitoki Sugitani

Member of the House of Peers
- In office July 10, 1932 – May 2, 1947

Personal details
- Born: 13 October 1892 Tokyo, Empire of Japan
- Died: 3 May 1965 (aged 72)
- Party: Kōseikai
- Spouse(s): Takako Morita; Yaeko Yamaguchi
- Children: Kiyotoki Sugitani
- Education: Tokyo Imperial University

Baron Yoshitoki Sugitani (杉溪由言, Sugitani Yoshitoki, November 13, 1892 – May 3, 1965) was a Japanese politician and nobleman. He served as a member of the House of Peers as a baron from 1932 to 1947.

== Life ==
Sugitani was born on November 13, 1892 as Tameyoshi Reizei, the son of Viscount Reizei Tameisa of the Reizei family. He was then adopted by Baron Sugitani Tokinaga, and changed his name to Yoshitoki in 1915. Following his father's retirement, he succeeded his father's baronetcy on October 1, 1929.

In July 1919, Sugitani graduated from the Imperial University of Tokyo, having majored in history. He continued his studies at the Imperial University of Tokyo in politics, graduating in 1922. He entered The Tokyo Electric Light Company the same year.

Sugitani served as an instructor and a magistrate at the Utakai Hajime. He also served as sankō (a high-ranking official waiting) in the Outa-dokoro of the Ministry of the Imperial Household.

On July 10, 1932, Sugitani was elected to the House of Peers as a baron member, representing Kōseikai. He served as a member of the House of Peers until May 2, 1947, when the House of Peers was abolished.

Sugitani served as a member of the coordinating committee of the Chuo Electric Power, a member of the Organic Synthesis Business Committee, and a commissioner of the Department of Justice. He also served as a founding committee member of the Nihon Sankin Shinkō.

Sugitani died on May 3, 1965.

== Family ==
- First wife: Takako (eldest daughter of Morita Masatsuna)
- Second wife: Yaeko (second daughter of Major General Yamaguchi Keizō)
- Eldest son: Kiyotoki Sugitani (Professor Emeritus of Japan Women's University)
