= Restoration Society =

Restoration Society may refer to:

- Guangfuhui, an anti-Qing organisation in China
- Ishinkai, a defunct political party in Japan
