= Shina Inoue Kan =

Japanese college professor

Shina Inoue
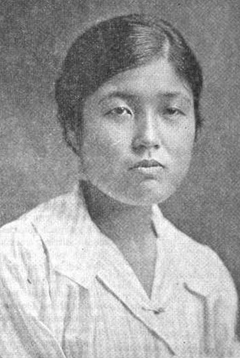
- Shina Inoue as a student, from a 1921 publication.
- Born: July 25, 1899; Japan Hyōgo Prefecture
- Died: October 7, 1982 (aged 83) 井上支那(Shina Inouye)
- Occupation: philosopher
- Relatives: Mother:Hideko Inoue, father:Masaji Inoue

Shina Inoue Kan (Japanese: 菅 支那, Kan Shina, July 25, 1899 – October 7, 1982), also seen as "Shina Inouye", "Shina Kan", and "Shinako Kan", was a Japanese college professor.

== Early life ==
Shina Inoue was born on 25 July 1899 in Hyōgo Prefecture, Japan. In 1921, her mother Hideko Inoue attended the Conference on Limitation of Armament in Washington D.C., representing the women's peace movement in Japan, with Yajima Kajiko and plant scientist Marian Irwin Osterhout. In 1931, Hide Inoue became the first woman president of Japan Women's University.

Shina Inoue graduated from Japan Women's University in 1921, and spent a year at the Punahou School in Hawaii on the Friend Peace Scholarship. She earned a Ph.D. from Yale University in 1927, with a philosophy dissertation titled "Leibniz and Fichte on the Nature of Will". After World War II, she completed further coursework in social welfare at Columbia University and Union Theological Seminary.

== Career ==
Shina Inoue Kan followed her mother into academia and peace work. She was a professor at Japan Women's University beginning in 1928, and a member of the executive board of the Japan Women's Peace Association. She was also active at the national level in the YWCA in Japan from 1933 to 1939, and in the Yale Club of Tokyo.

She reported on progress in Japanese women's rights in 1950 for the Institute of Pacific Relations, noting with encouragement the rates of female participation, as both voters and candidates, in the first elections after the war, and the establishment of a Women's Bureau in the Ministry of Labor, among other advances. "Thus, in many fields the women of Japan are being gradually freed from disabilities inherited from the feudal past," she concluded, "and are striving to attain a position of equality in political, economic, and social life."

Shina Kan represented the Japan Association of University Women at the Pan-Pacific Women's Conference at Honolulu in 1949, and in Manila, in 1955. In the 1950s she was dean of the Department of Social Welfare at Japan Women's University, and on the executive board of the International Association of Schools of Social Work. She was vice-president of the Japan section of the Women's International League for Peace and Freedom from 1957 to 1961, and the league's president in 1963. Kan retired from the university in 1968.

== Personal life ==
Before 1927, Shina Inoue married Christian theologian, professor and translator William Enkichi Kan (1895-1972). She died on 7 October 1982.
