= Yamaguchi Keizō =

Imperial Japanese military official

Major General Junior Fourth Rank Yamaguchi Keizō
- 山口 圭蔵
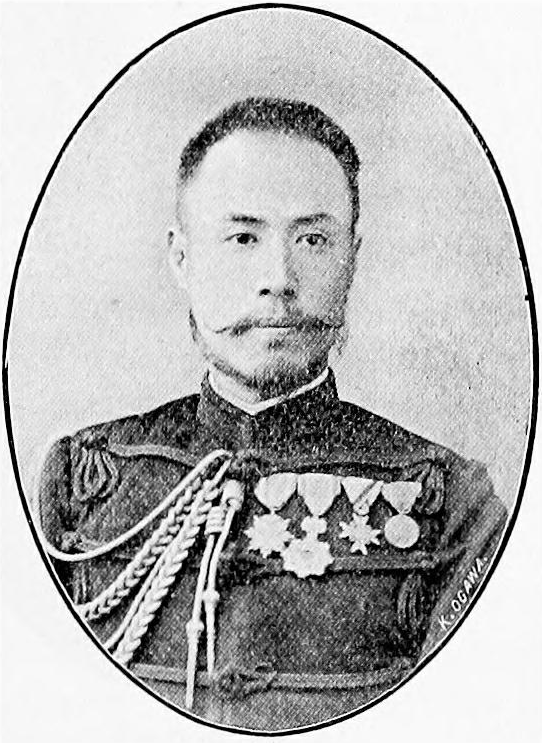

Personal details
- Born: November 3, 1861 Kyoto, Japan
- Died: June 15, 1932 (aged 70)
- Education: Imperial Japanese Army Academy; Army War College
- Awards: Order of the Sacred Treasure, 3rd class

Military service
- Allegiance: Empire of Japan
- Branch/service: Imperial Japanese Army
- Years of service: 1879–1907
- Rank: Major General
- Battles/wars: First Sino-Japanese War; Russo-Japanese War

Yamaguchi Keizō (山口 圭蔵; November 3, 1861 – June 15, 1932) was a Japanese general in the Imperial Japanese Army. He held the court rank of Junior Fourth Rank.

== Life ==
Yamaguchi was born on November 3, 1861, in Kyoto, the eldest son of shizoku Yamaguchi Masakiyo.

He graduated from the Imperial Japanese Army Academy in 1879, and was appointed second lieutenant. In 1885, he graduated from the Army War College.

In 1890, Yamaguchi was appointed to the 2nd Bureau of the General Staff Office. He was promoted to major in 1891, and was appointed an instructor at the Military Medical School in 1893. The following year, he was appointed 2nd Battalion Commander of the 21st Infantry Regiment and fought in the First Sino-Japanese War.

On October 11, 1897, Yamaguchi was appointed colonel of the Army Infantry, principal of the Toyama Military Academy, and director of the Kangunbu (a management organization of the Imperial Japanese Army). The next year, he was appointed Chief of Staff, 11th Division.

Yamaguchi was made major general and appointed commander of the 5th Infantry Brigade on May 5, 1902. However, during the Russo-Japanese War, Nanbu Shinpei replaced Yamaguchi as acting commander in 1904. Yamaguchi was officially dismissed from the post and sent to temporary retirement in January 1905. In March 1907, he was placed in service in the first reserve.

He received the court rank of Junior Fourth Rank on April 20, 1907.

== Family ==
- Eldest daughter: Chiyoko (married Count Saigō Jūdō's seventh son)
- Second daughter: Yaeko (married Baron Yoshitoki Sugitani)
- Third daughter: Mihoko (married Count Nobutomi Ōki)

== Orders ==
- Order of the Sacred Treasure, 6th class, Silver Rays (1893)
- Order of the Sacred Treasure, 4th class, Gold Rays with Rosette (1902)
- Order of the Sacred Treasure, 3rd class, Gold Rays with Neck Ribbon (1904)
