= Shinseikai =

Political party in Japan

The Shinseikai (Japanese: 新政会, lit. 'New Politics Society') was a political party in Japan between 1917 and 1920.

== History ==
The party was established in October 1917 as a merger of the Ishinkai (39 seats) and a group of 12 independent National Diet members, becoming the third-largest party in the House of Representatives. However, in February 1918, around half its members broke away to form the Seiwa Club. Another four members left in February 1920, and the party lost nearly all its seats in the May 1920 elections. The following month its sole member was amongst the founders of the Kōshin Club, alongside the Seikō Club and some independents.
