= Seiwa Club =

Political party in Japan

The Seiwa Club (Purity and Harmony Club) was a political party in Japan.

== History ==
The party was established in February 1918 as a breakaway by 28 Shinseikai members. In December 1918 it merged with a group of independent members of the National Diet to form an "Independent Group" that later became the Seikō Club.
