= Tsuruko Haraguchi =

Japanese psychologist

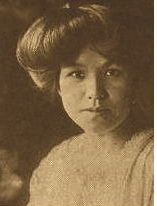
- Haraguchi, c. 1909
- Born: Tsuru Arai (新井つる); June 18, 1886; Tomioka, Gunma, Japan
- Died: 26 September 1915 (aged 29)
- Occupation: Academic psychologist

Academic background
- Education: Japan Women's University, Teachers College, Columbia University
- Thesis: Mental Fatigue (1912)
- Doctoral advisor: Edward Thorndike
- Other advisors: Matatarō Matsumoto, Robert S. Woodworth, James McKeen Cattell

Academic work
- Discipline: Psychology
- Sub-discipline: Experimental psychology; Pedagogy
- Main interests: Mental fatigue
- Notable ideas: Transferred fatigue
- Influenced: Tomi Wada

Tsuruko Haraguchi (Japanese: 原口鶴子; 18 June 1886 – 26 September 1915) was a Japanese psychologist and the first Japanese woman to receive a Doctor of Philosophy.

== Life and career ==
Haraguchi was born Tsuru Arai (新井つる) in Tomioka, Japan in 1886. Her father was a wealthy farmer and she had two sisters. She attended Takasaki Women's High School, graduating in 1902, two years earlier than her classmates of the same age.

She next enrolled in at Japan Women's University in 1903 to study humanities in the Faculty of English Literature. At the time, women were not allowed to earn graduate degrees or beyond at Japanese universities, and higher educational institutions for women were not yet officially recognized. Thus, when her mentor, the psychologist Matsumoto Matataro, encouraged her to pursue further education, she left Japan for the United States after graduating in 1906.

On her journey to America, Haraguchi was accompanied by a foreign missionary woman for part of the journey. The two arrived in Vancouver, Canada after twelve days of traveling, and then parted ways, with Haraguchi heading towards New York. She arrived in New York in mid-summer and worked at a summer camp for the remaining portion of the summer until her classes started at Columbia University.

=== Studies at Columbia University ===
Haraguchi entered the Teachers College of Columbia University in 1907 to complete a doctorate in psychology. She focused on experimental psychology and pedagogy, and was taught by Edward Thorndike, Robert S. Woodworth and James McKeen Cattell. Her doctoral thesis, titled "Mental Fatigue", was completed under Thorndike's supervision. Her research on fatigue explored topics such as the influence of mental work on physiological processes and on the changes in mental efficiency. The dissertation was compiled of four studies, three of which she was the only subject.

In Experiment 1, she mentally multiplied four-digit numbers for up to eleven hours straight for several days, only pausing to record how long each problem took to complete and to eat. Before and after the multiplication test, Haraguchi also made a test for transferred fatigue, in which she translated German words into their English equivalents. She recorded how long it took her to correctly recall the translation. In Experiment 2, she repeated the procedure in Experiment 1, but also recorded her pulse, her state of feeling and health. This experiment lasted 78 days. In Experiment 3, Haraguchi translated sentences from John Dewey's writing into Japanese, and recorded the time taken to translate each page. She also measured the temperature under her tongue. Experiment 4 was the only experiment to have multiple subjects. Her 26 subjects carried out numerous tasks, consisting of: memorising nonsense monosyllables; adding columns of one-digit numbers; association work; and mental multiplication. Their pulse was measured after each test.

Haraguchi's results indicated a relationship between fatigue, efficiency and transferred fatigue. She found that mental fatigue could be transferred from task to task, and found a positive correlation between fatigue and transferred fatigue. She also found that efficiency increases after continuous work, illustrating the effect of practice. After five years of research, Haraguchi earned her doctorate on 5 June 1912, becoming the first Japanese woman to attain a PhD in any field. She was married that same day.

=== Later life in Japan ===
Haraguchi returned to Japan, where she expanded her doctoral thesis and translated it into Japanese. It was published under the title Studies on Mental Work and Fatigue in 1914. She lectured at Japan Women's University occasionally and was involved in the establishment of an experimental psychology laboratory at the university.

She also wrote a memoir, Tanoshiki omohide, or "Pleasant memoirs", in 1915, in which she drew from her experiences studying at Columbia University to advocate for women's education and value. Much of Haraguchi's memoirs were allotted to explaining Japanese readership of Taishō Japan North American life and customs. In them she explained her perception of North American women compared to women in the Meiji period. She talked about the Meiji women and their campaigns for social and political rights.

== Personal life ==
Haraguchi married Takejirō Haraguchi, a Waseda University professor, on 5 June 1912. They had a son and daughter.

== Death and legacy ==
Haraguchi died of tuberculosis on September 26, 1915, at age 29. Her last work, a Japanese translation of Francis Galton's Hereditary Genius (first published in 1869), was published posthumously in 1915. A record of her experiences at Columbia University and her observations of cultural differences between Japan and the U.S., Happy Memories, was also published in 1915.

Two documentaries have been produced about Haraguchi's life and work: The Life of Tsuruko Haraguchi (2007) and Psychologist Tsuruko Haraguchi: Memories of Her Days at Columbia University in the Early 1900s (2008).
