= Kengo Kuma =

Japanese architect (born 1954)

- 隈 研吾
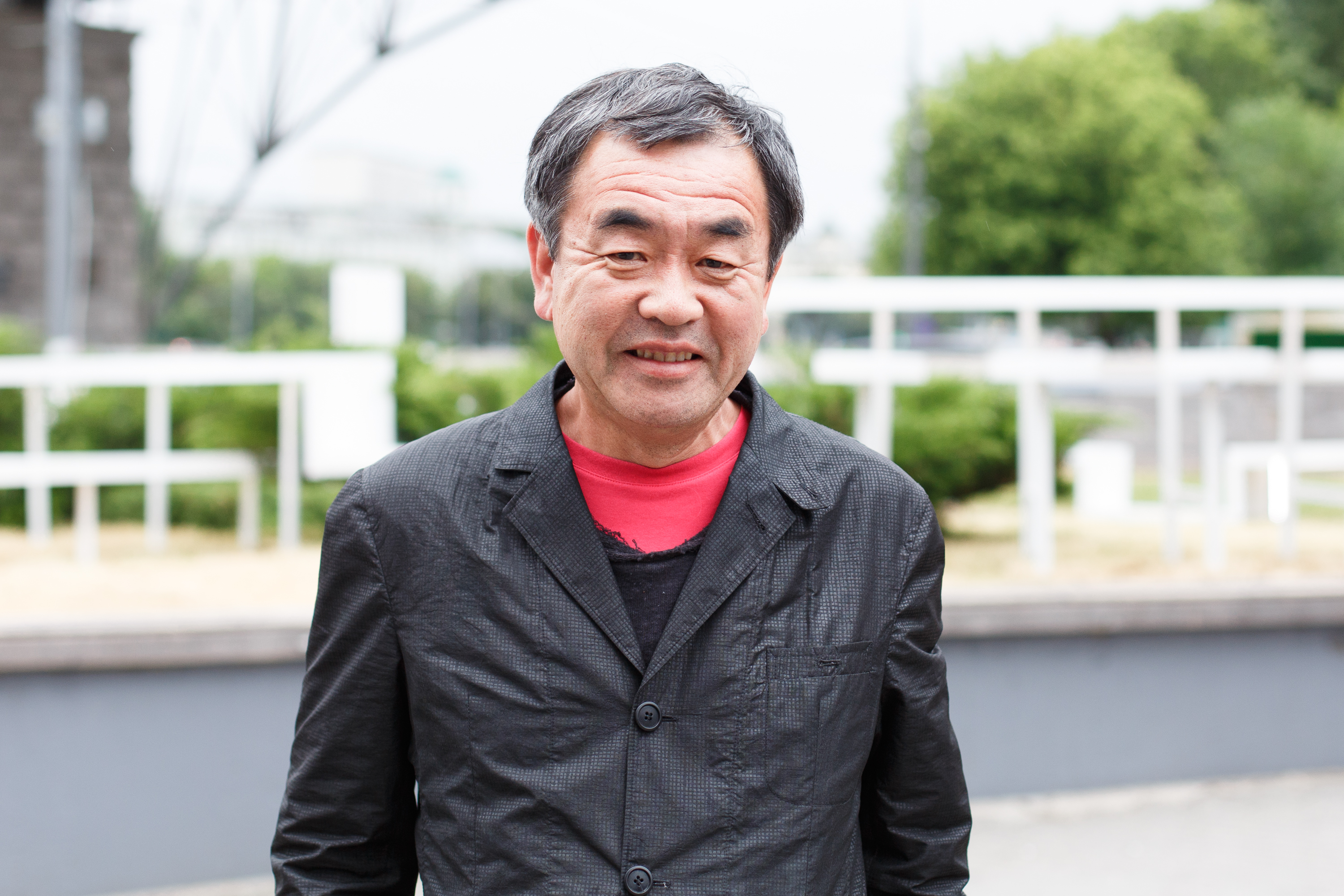
- Kuma in 2014
- Born: August 8, 1954 (age 72); Yokohama, Japan
- Education: University of Tokyo
- Occupation: Architect
- Spouse: Satoko Shinohara
- Website: kkaa.co.jp/en/

Kengo Kuma (Japanese: 隈 研吾, Hepburn: Kuma Kengo; born August 8, 1954) is a Japanese architect and emeritus professor in the Department of Architecture at the University of Tokyo. Frequently compared to contemporaries Shigeru Ban and Kazuyo Sejima, Kuma designed the Japan National Stadium in Tokyo, built for the 2020 Summer Olympics.

== Early life and education ==
Kuma was born in Kanagawa, and attended Eiko Gakuen Junior and Senior High School. After graduating in architecture from the University of Tokyo in 1979, he worked for a time at Nihon Sekkei and Toda Corporation.

== Career ==
In 1987, Kuma founded the Spatial Design Studio, and in 1990, he established his own firm, Kengo Kuma & Associates. He has taught at Columbia University, the University of Illinois at Urbana-Champaign, and Keio University, where in 2008, Kuma was awarded a Ph.D. degree in architecture. As a professor at the Graduate School of Architecture at the University of Tokyo, he runs a variety of research projects concerning architecture, urbanism and design within his laboratory, Kuma Lab. Kengo Kuma & Associates employs over 300 architects in Tokyo, China (Beijing and Shanghai) and Paris, designing projects of diverse type and scale throughout the world.

== Philosophy and writing ==
Kuma's stated goal is to recover the tradition of Japanese buildings and to reinterpret these traditions for the 21st century. Kuma lectures extensively and is the author of numerous books and articles discussing and criticizing approaches in contemporary architecture. In 2008 Kuma's Anti-Object: The Dissolution and Disintegration of Architecture, was published in English by the Architectural Association. The book, which was first published in Japan in 2000, calls for an architecture of relations, respecting its surroundings instead of dominating them. Kuma's projects often reference his interest in the manipulation of light with nature through materiality. He also wrote the foreword for a 2017 English translation of In Praise of Shadows (陰翳礼讃, In'ei Raisan), Jun'ichirō Tanizaki's seminal essay about Japanese aesthetics, which Kuma has described as having an important influence on his own philosophy and practice.

=== Material theory ===
Although remaining in continuity with Japanese traditions with the clarity of structural solutions, implied tectonics, and importance of light and transparency, Kuma does not restrain himself to the banal and superficial use of ‘light’ materials. Instead, he goes much deeper, extending to the mechanisms of composition to expand the possibilities of materiality. He utilizes technological advancements which can challenge unexpected materials, such as stone, into providing the same sense of lightness and softness as glass or wood. Kuma attempts to attain a sense of spatial immateriality as a consequence of the ‘particulate nature’ of the light and establishing a relationship between a space and the natural round around it.

Describing his practice, Kuma said "You could say that my aim is 'to recover the place'. The place is a result of nature and time; this is the most important aspect. I think my architecture is some kind of frame of nature. With it, we can experience nature more deeply and more intimately. Transparency is a characteristic of Japanese architecture; I try to use light and natural materials to get a new kind of transparency."

In many of Kuma’s projects, attention is focused on the connection spaces; on the segments between inside and outside, and one room to the next. The choice of materials stems not so much from an intention to guide the design of the forms, but to conform to the existing surroundings from a desire to compare similar materials, yet show the technical advances that have made possible new uses.

When dealing with stone work, for example, Kuma displays a different character from the preexisting buildings of solid, heavy, traditional masonry construction. Instead his work surprises the eye by slimming down and dissolving the walls in an effort to express a certain “lightness” and immateriality, suggesting an illusion of ambiguity and weakness not common to the solidity of stone construction.

In parallel, Kuma showed material innovation to support local traditional craftsmanship through his works. Collaborating with Japanese craftsmen specialized in wood, earth or paper, he helped in maintaining the associated building techniques while modernizing them, bringing his know-how in modularity. This work led Kuma to win a Global Award for Sustainable Architecture in 2016.

== Projects ==
Key projects include the Suntory Museum of Art in Tokyo, Bamboo Wall House in China, LVMH (Louis Vuitton Moet Hennessy) Group's Japan headquarters, Besançon Art Center in France, and one of the largest spas in the Caribbean for Mandarin Oriental Dellis Cay.

Stone Roof, a private residence in Nagano, Japan, built in 2010, consists of a roof which is meant to spring from the ground, providing a complete enclosure to the home. A local stone was chosen to intimately relate itself to the preexisting natural environment of the mountainside. The exterior stonework is made light and airy by cutting each stone into thin slices and bracing each slice as a pivoting panel. In this way, the heavy quality of the stone is diluted and provides the eye with an illusion of lightness, allowing light and air directly into the space within. With this choice of material and construction, a new kind of transparency emerges; one that not only frames nature the way a glass curtain wall would but also deeply relates itself to the mountainside.

In 2016, Kuma also delved into designing pre-fabricated pavilions in partnership with Revolution Precrafted. He designed the mobile multifunctional pavilion named The Aluminum Cloud Pavilion. The structure, composed of aluminum panels joined using Kangou technique, can be used as a teahouse or a space of meditation.

As a part of the Time–Space–Existence video interview series Kengo Kuma collaborated with the European Cultural Centre to create a video documentation discussing the topics Time Space and Existence.

In 2026, Kuma was selected as the chosen architect to design the new wing of the National Gallery, London, part of a £750 million regeneration of the gallery.

== Kuma Lab ==
Kuma Lab is a Research Laboratory headed by Kuma based in the Department of Architecture, Faculty of Engineering at the University of Tokyo's Hongo Campus that was started in 2009. In 2012, Kuma Lab published the book Patterns and Layering, Japanese Spatial Culture, Nature and Architecture, including the research from various Doctoral Candidate Lab members.

The lab's research topics consist of: a comprehensive survey of architectural, urban, community, landscape, and product designs; survey of structural, material, and mechanical designs; and methodology for bridging sustainable, physical, and information designs. Its activities include participation in architectural design competitions, organization and management of regional and international design workshops, joint research with other departments at the University of Tokyo, and research and proposal to aid the recovery from the Great East Japan earthquake.

== Personal life ==
Kuma is married to architect Satoko Shinohara. They have a son, Taichi, who is also an architect.

== Selected works ==
- Small Bath House in Izu (1988) (with Satoko Shinohara)
- M2 building (1989–1991)
- Kiro-San observatory (1994)
- Kitakami Canal Museum (1994)
- Water/Glass, Atami (1995)
- Bato Hiroshige Museum (2000)
- Stone Museum (2000)
- Great (Bamboo) Wall House, Beijing (2002)
- Plastic House (2002)
- LVMH Group Japan headquarters, Osaka (2003)
- Lotus House (2003)
- Suntory's Tokyo office building
- Food and Agriculture Museum, Tokyo University of Agriculture (2004)
- Nagasaki Prefectural Art Museum (2005)
- Kodan apartments (2005)
- Water Block House (2007)
- The Opposite House, Beijing (2008)
- Nezu Museum, Minato, Tokyo (2009)
- V&A Dundee, Scotland (2010–2018)
- Stone Roof (2010)
- Taikoo Li Sanlitun, Beijing (2010)
- Akagi Jinja and Park Court Kagurazaka (2010)
- Yusuhara Wooden Bridge Museum (2011)
- Meme Meadows Experimental House, Hokkaido. Japan (2012)
- Asakusa Culture Tourist Information Center (2012)
- Wisdom Tea House (2012)
- Cité des Arts et de la Culture, Besançon (2013)
- inverted house, Hokkaido with the Oslo School of Architecture and Design, Raphael Zuber, Neven Fuchs and Laura Cristea (2015–2016)
- Seibu 4000 series Fifty-two Seats of Happiness tourist train (2016)
- Japanese Garden Cultural Village, Portland, Oregon, USA (2017)
- Misono-za, Nagoya (2018)
- Eskisehir Modern Art Center (2018)
- Japan National Stadium, Tokyo (2019)
- Takanawa Gateway Station, Tokyo (2020)
- The Kadokawa Culture Museum at Tokorozawa Sakura Town in Tokorozawa, Japan (2020)
- Yawara nursery school, Hokkaido, Japan (2020)
- 1550 Alberni, apartments in Vancouver, Canada. (completed in 2023)
- House of Fairytales, Odense, Denmark (2021)
- "Kigumi Table", Eins zu Eins Germany.
- Founders' Memorial, Singapore (to be completed in 2027)
- EPFL Art Lab
- Grand Morillon Résidence étudiante, Graduate Institute, Geneva
- Saint-Denis–Pleyel station, Paris, France (2024)
- Malaysia Pavilion, Expo 2025, Osaka, Japan (2025)
- Hyatt Regency Kuala Lumpur at KL Midtown, KL Metropolis, Kuala Lumpur, Malaysia (2025)
- Shipyard 1914, Canton, China (2025)
- Aichi International Arena, Nagoya (2025)
- Porch at Angers Cathedral, Angers, France (2026)
- Kuma Tower, Taichung, Taiwan (to be completed in 2026)
- National Gallery, London, England (announced)
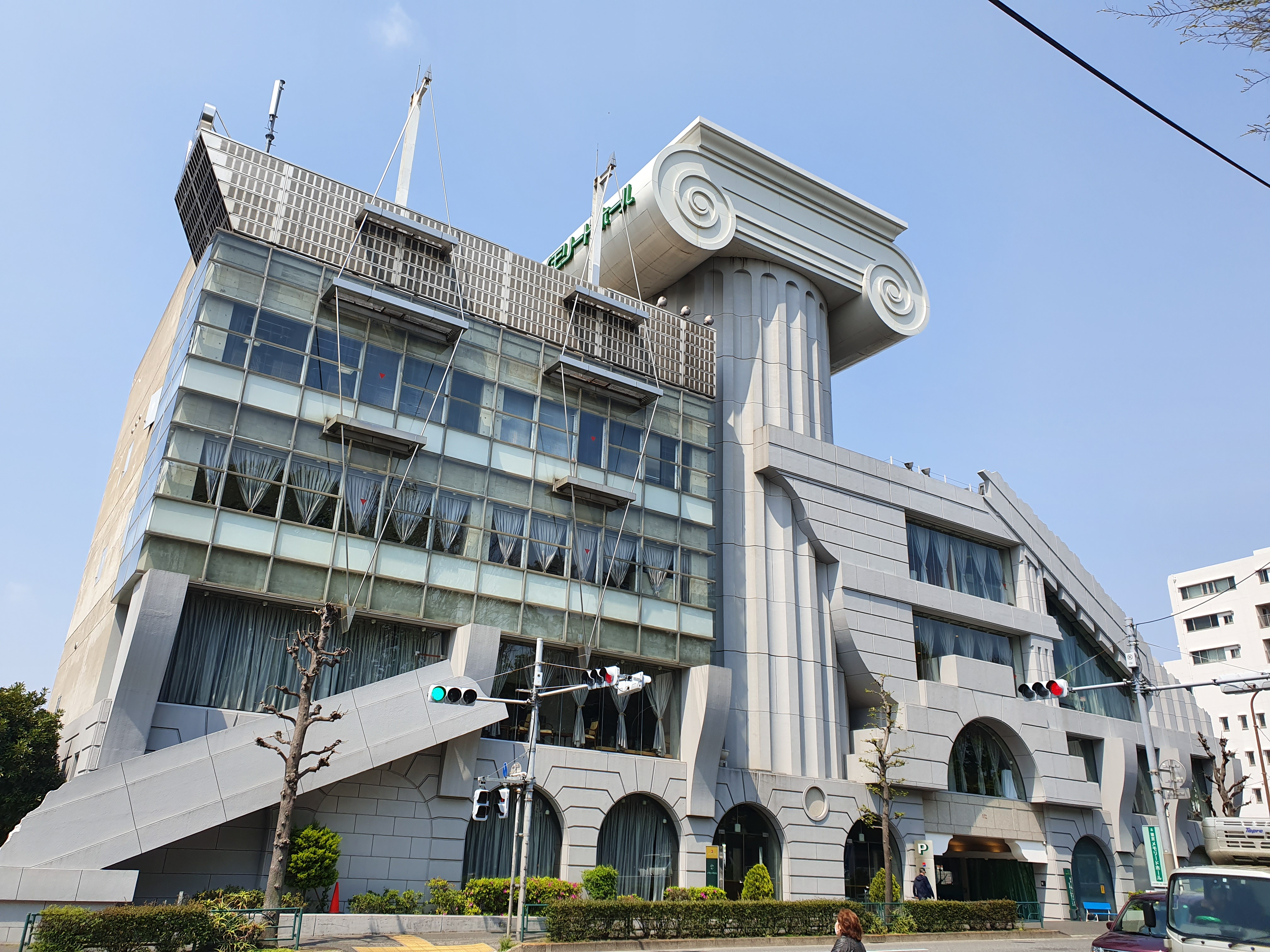
M2 building

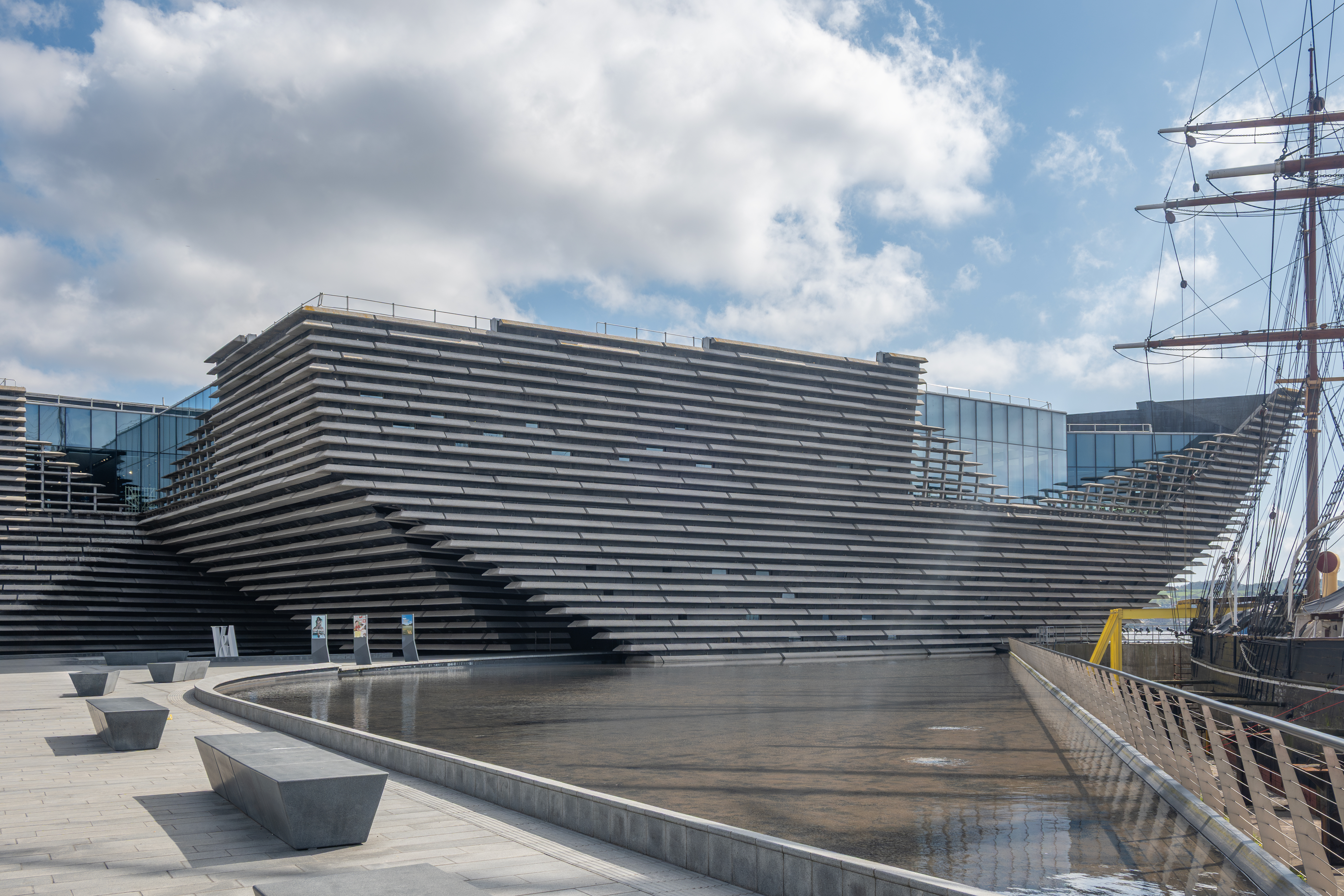
V&A Dundee, Scotland

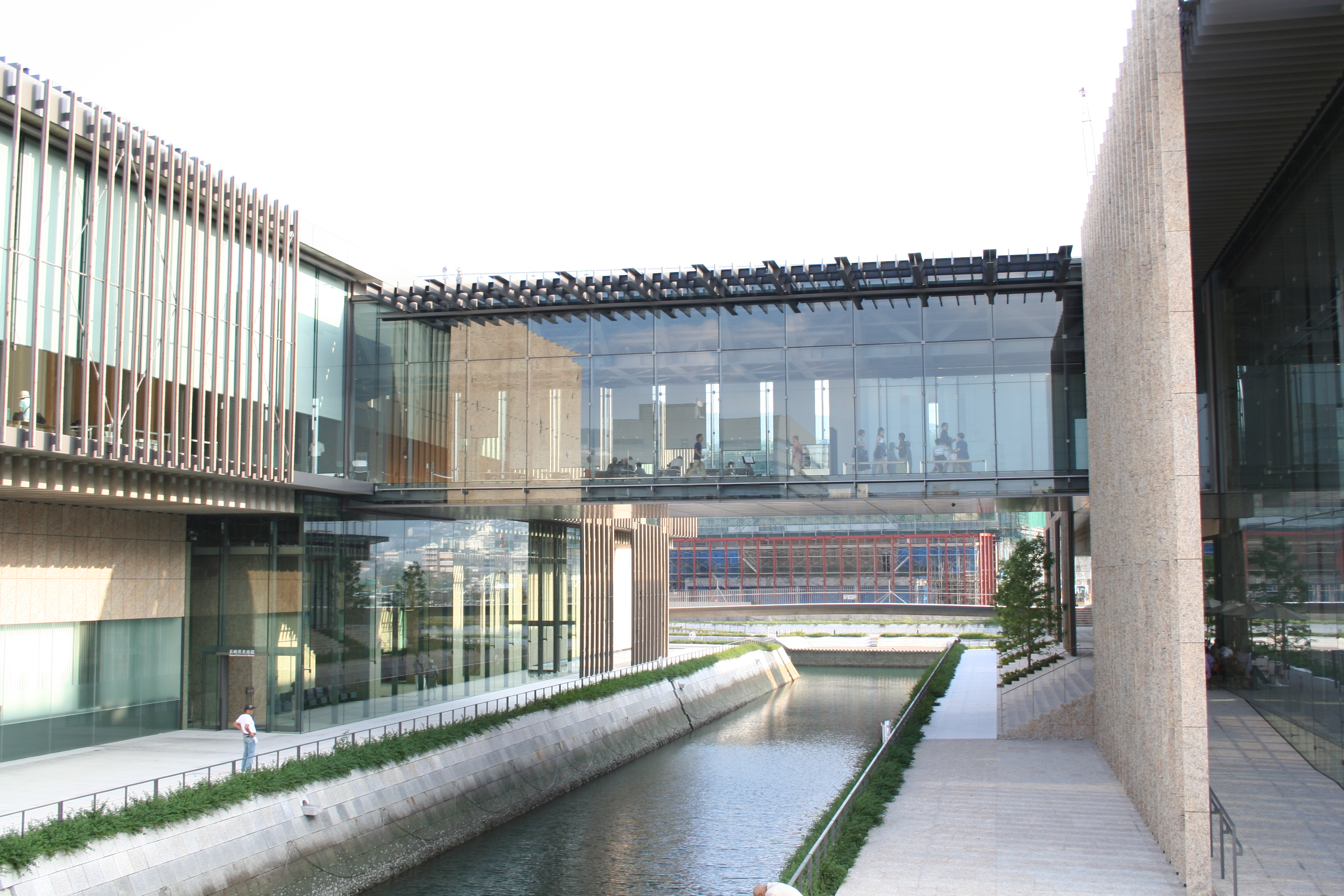
Nagasaki Prefectural Art Museum

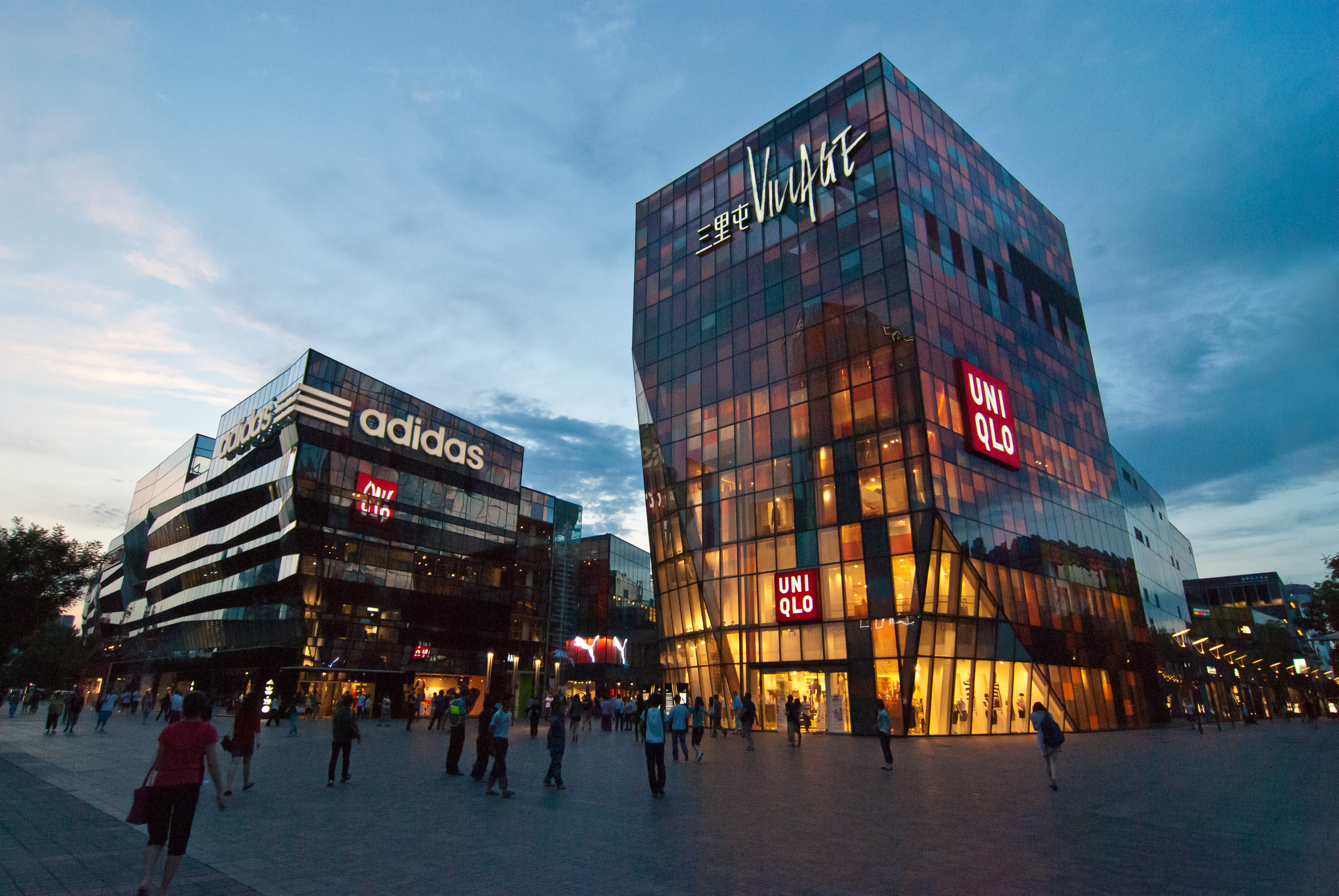
Taikoo Li Sanlitun, Beijing

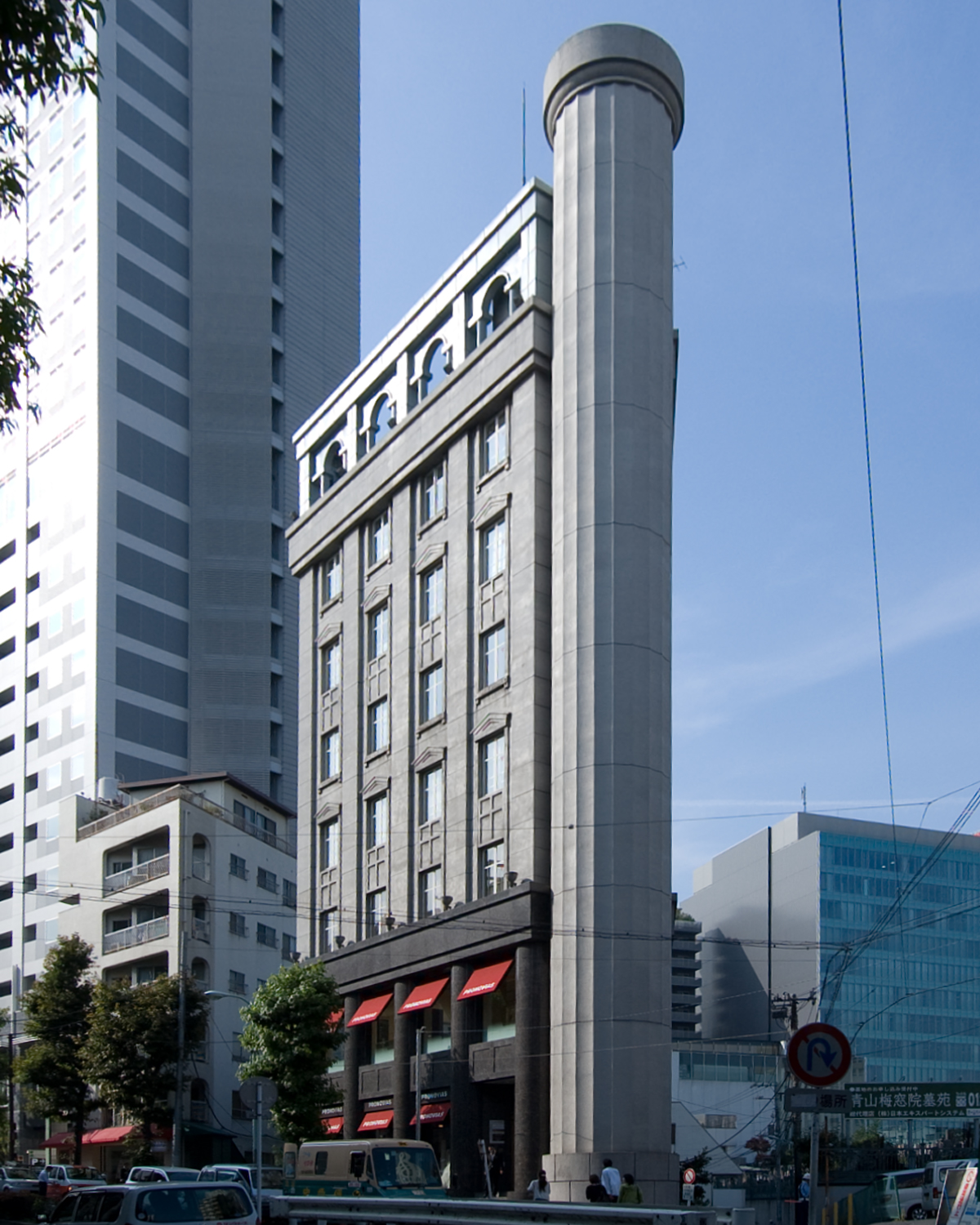
Doric building, Minato-ku, Tokyo

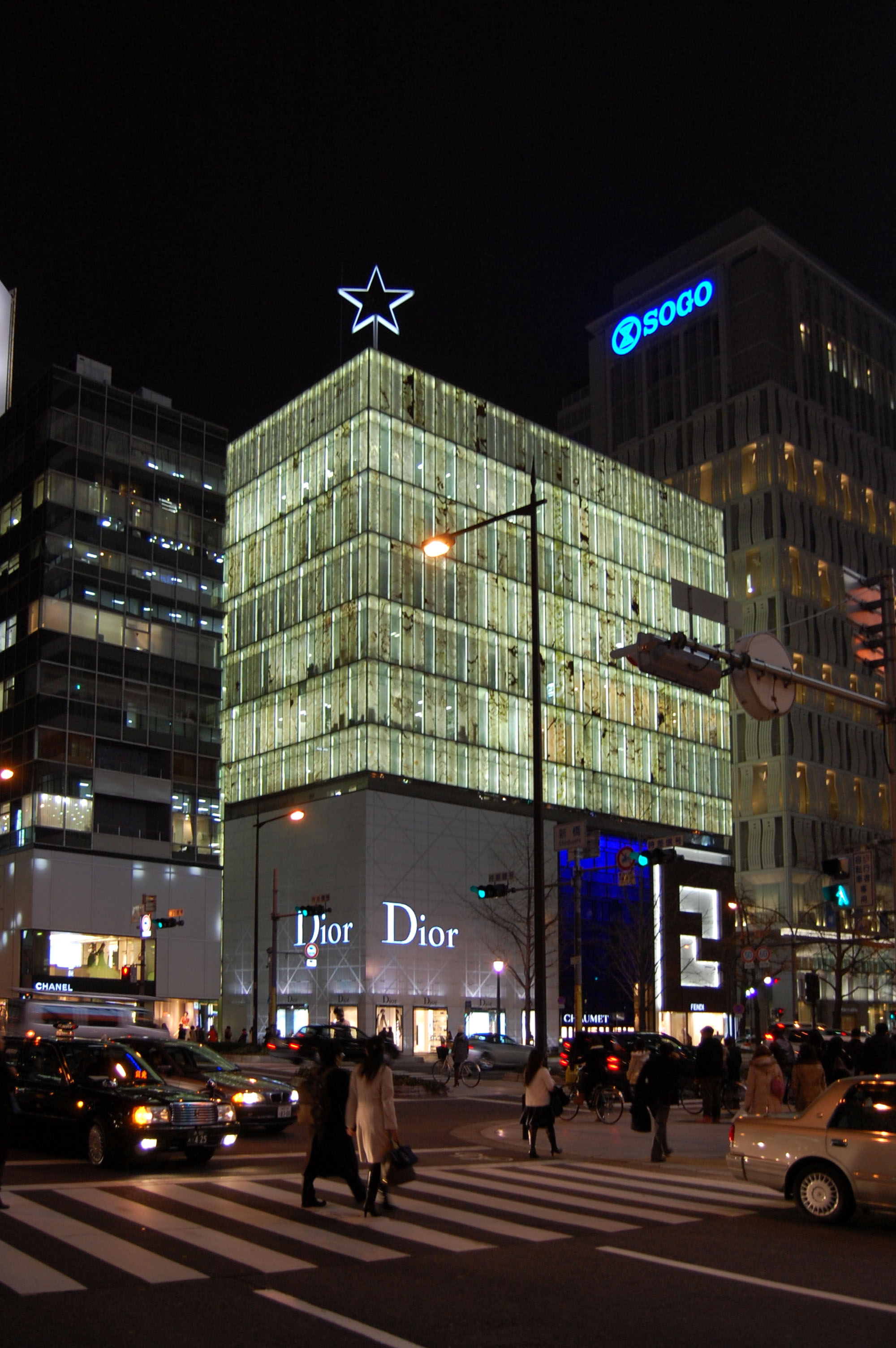
LVMH Group Japan headquarters, Osaka

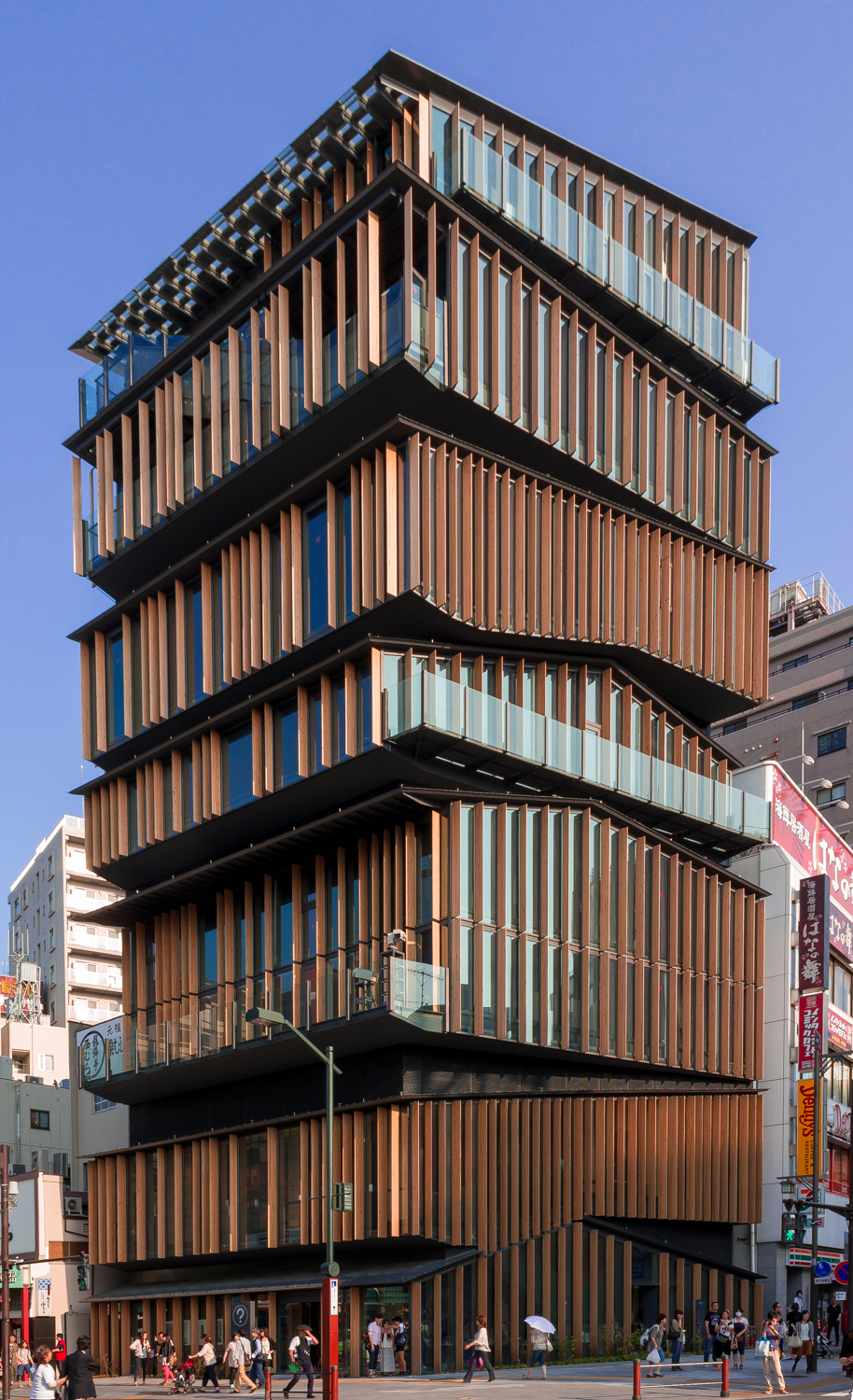
Asakusa Culture Tourist Information Center, Taito-ku, Tokyo

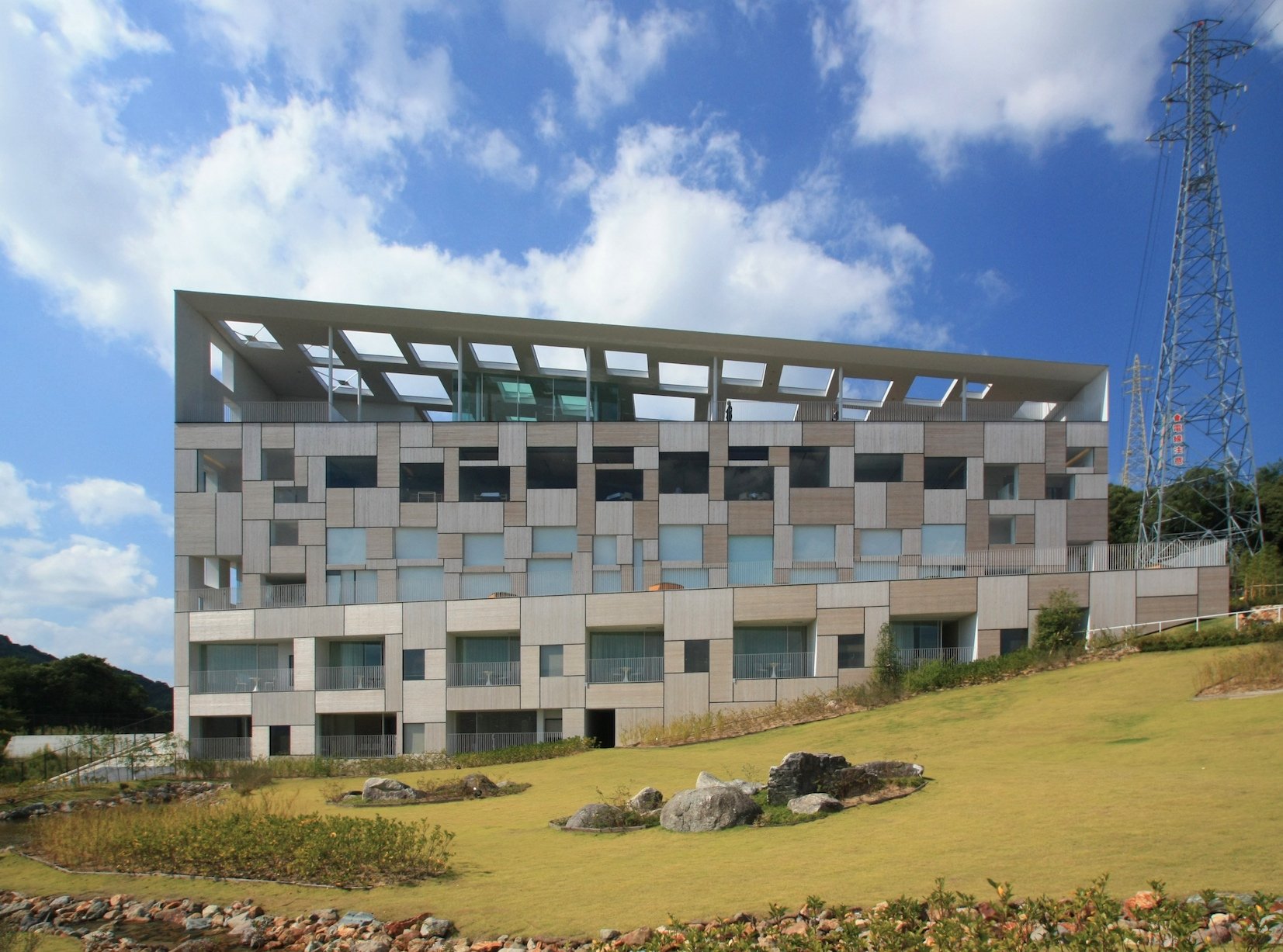
Garden Terrace Hotel, Nagasaki

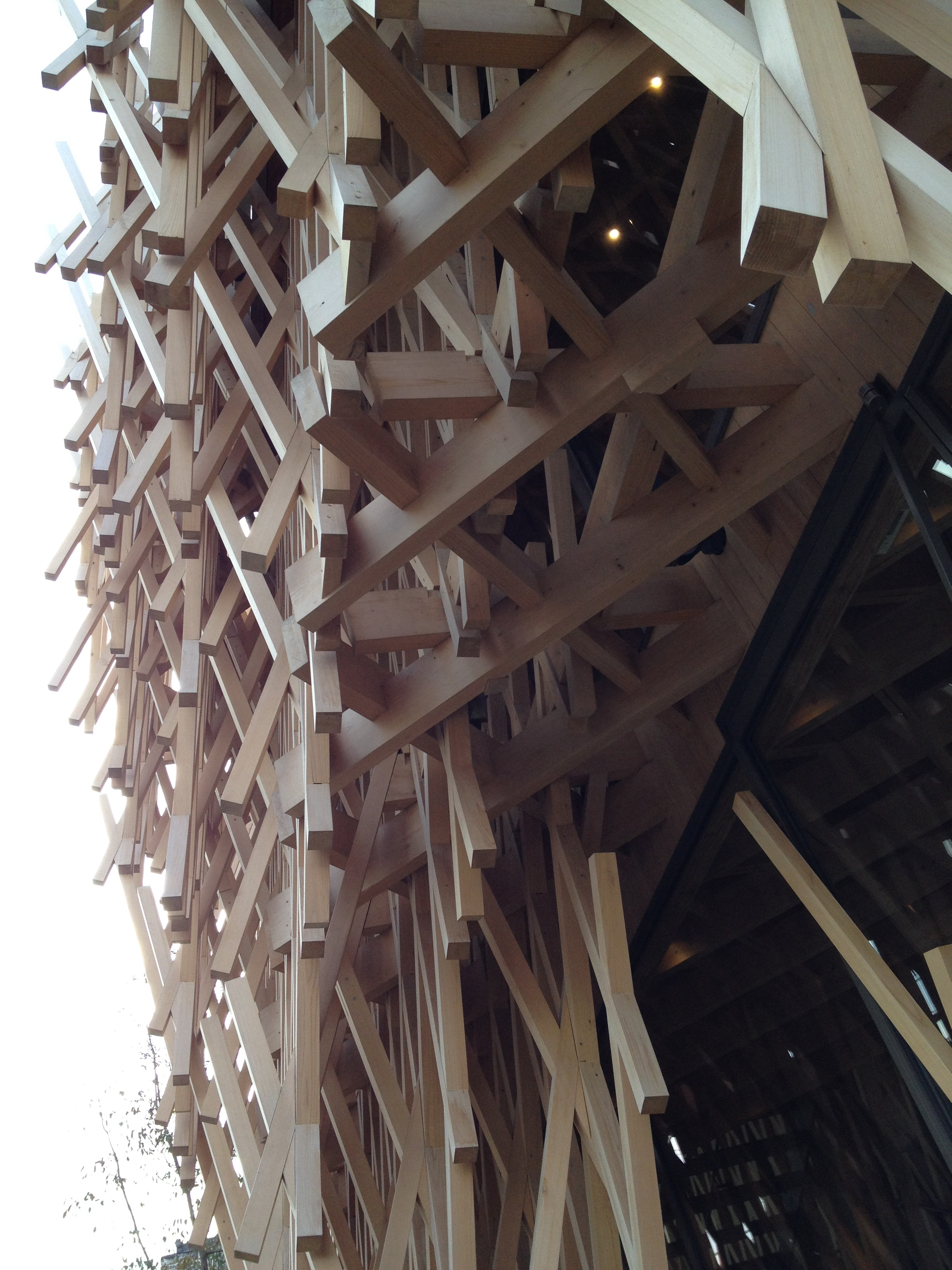
Sunny Hills by Kengo Kuma

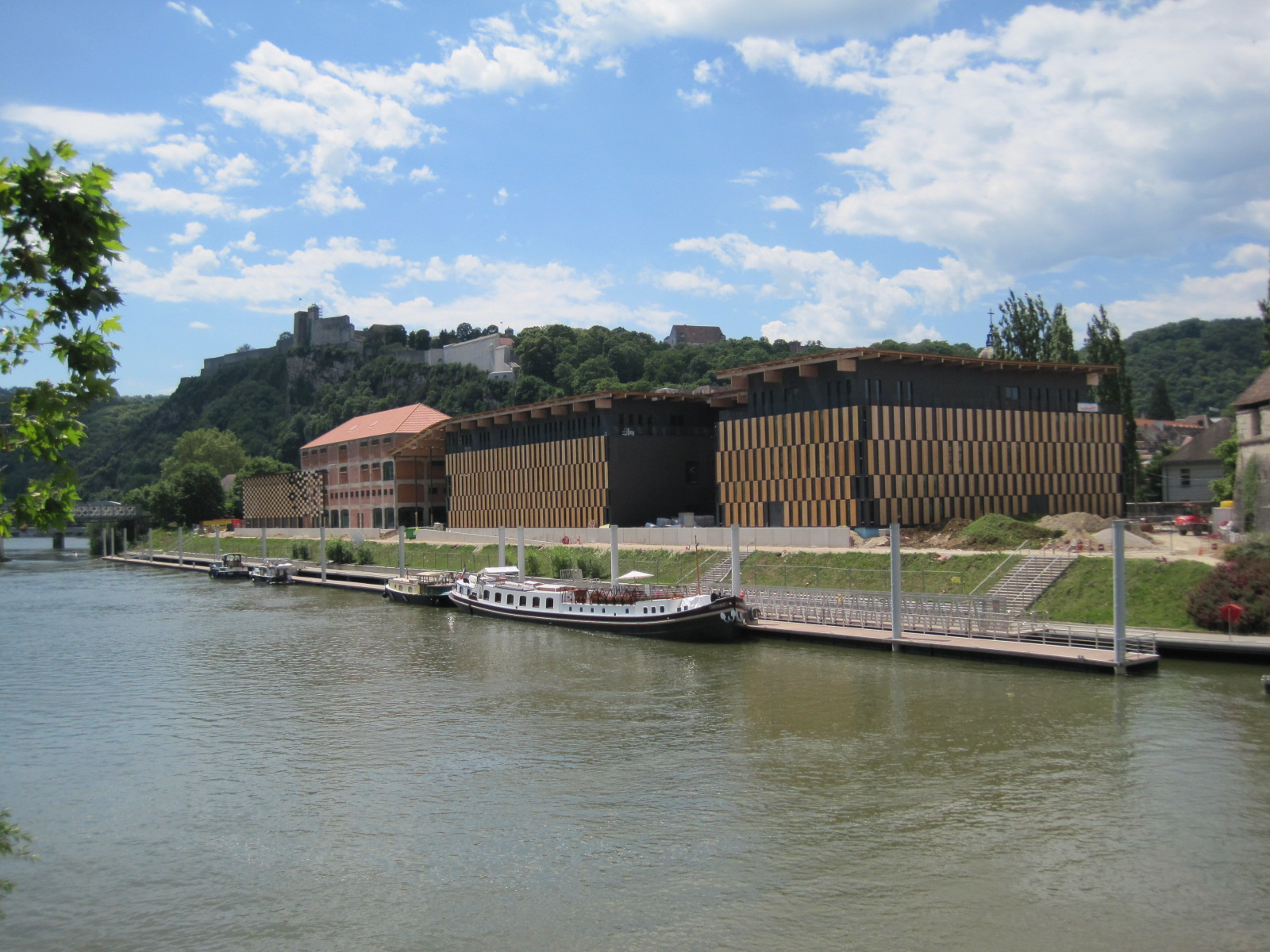
Cité des Arts et de la Culture, Besançon

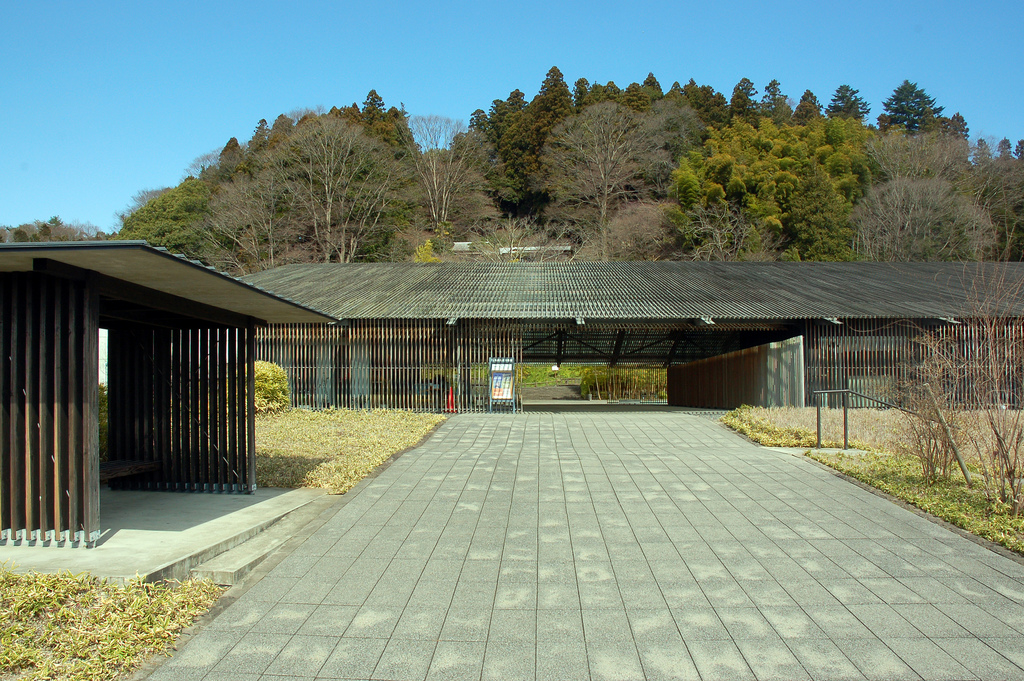
Bato Hiroshige Museum

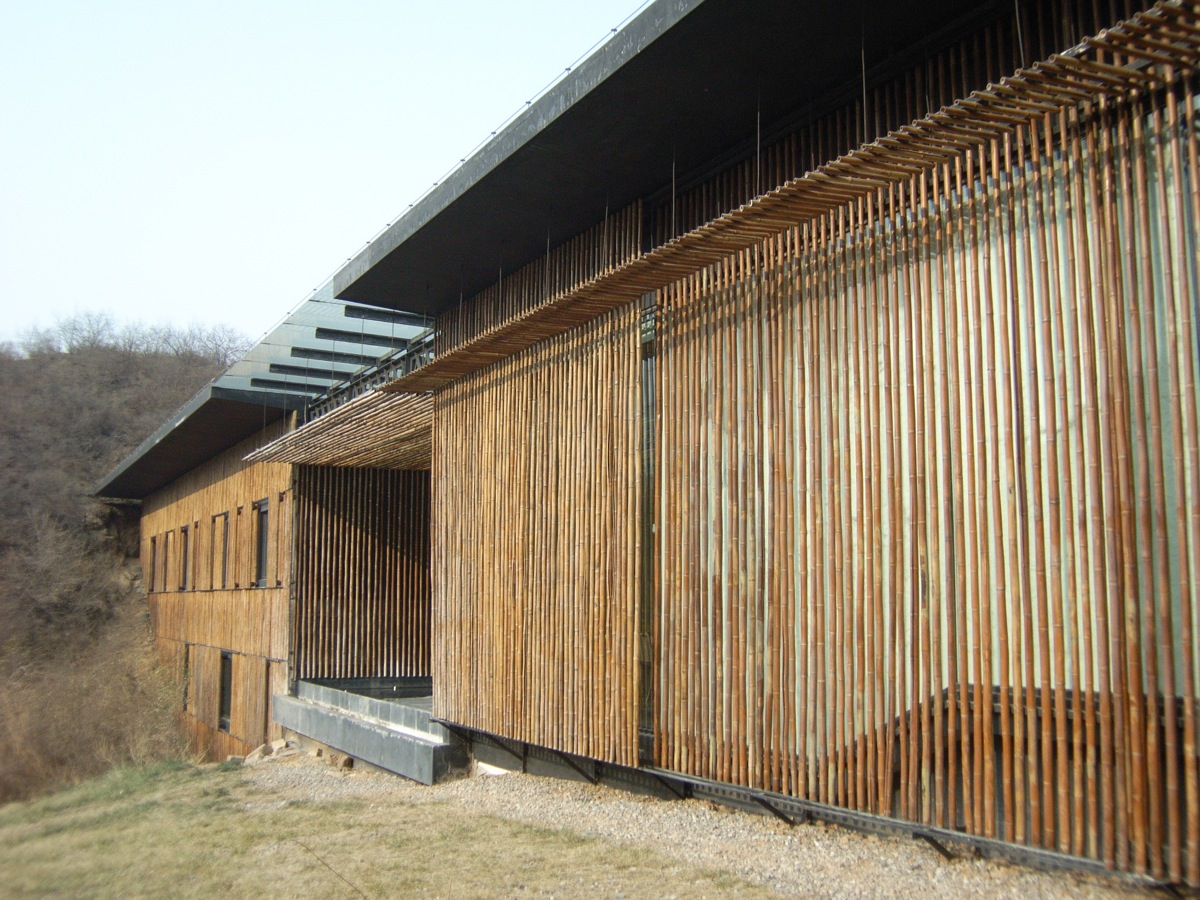
Commune by the Great Wall of China

Wuxi Chinese Clay Figurines Museum

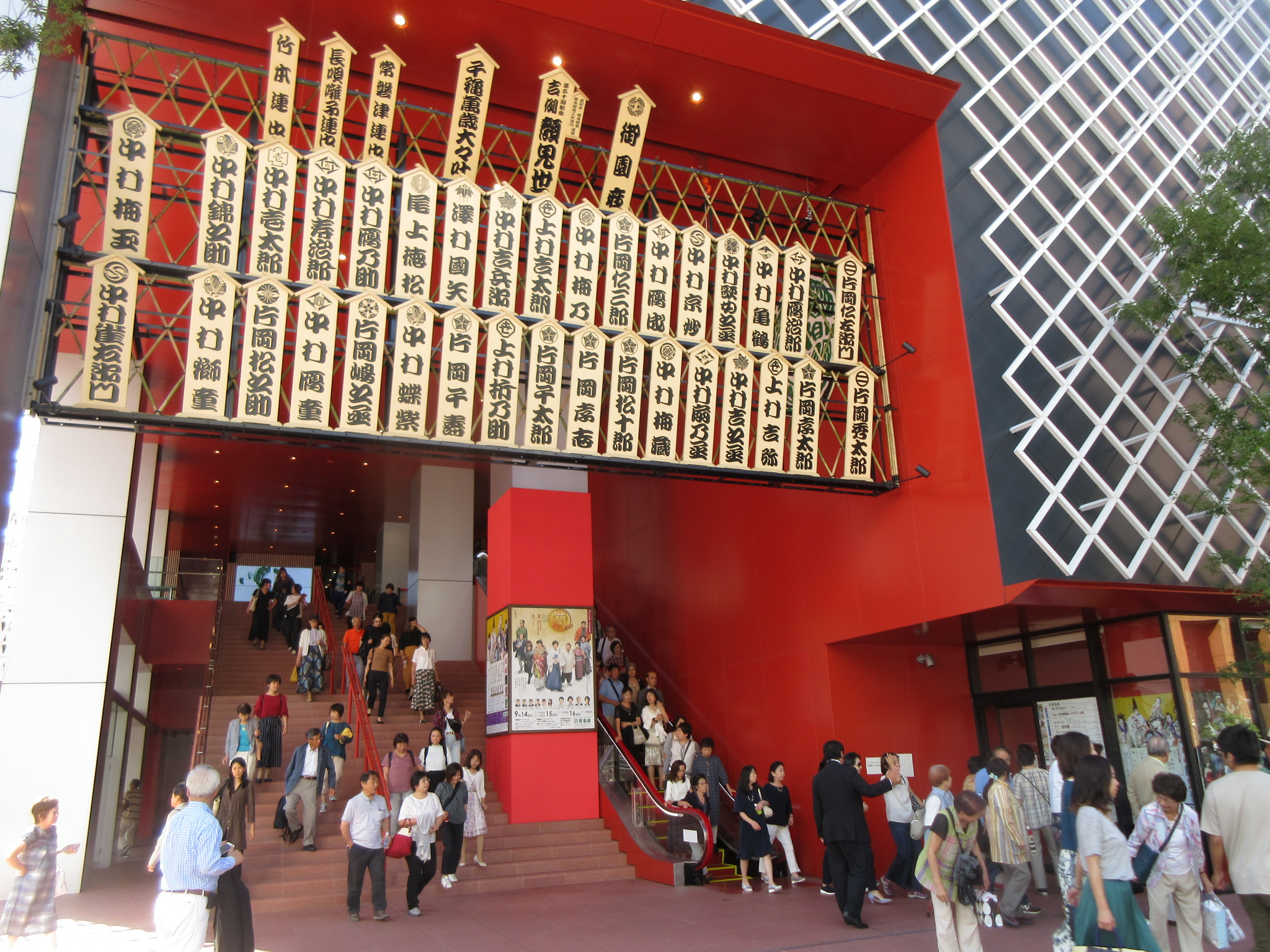
Misono-za theatre, Nagoya

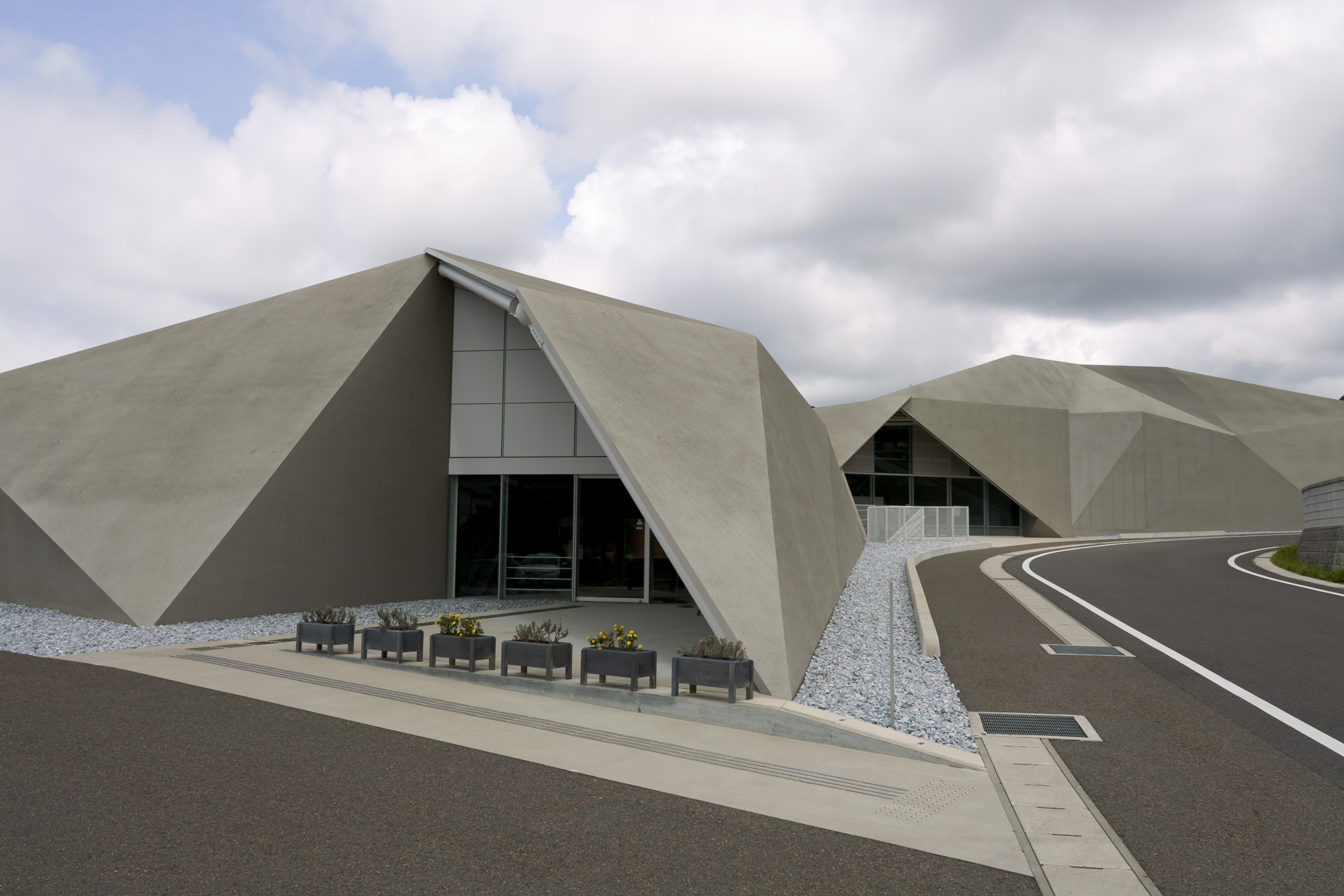
Kawatana no mori

== Awards and honours ==
In 1997, he won the Architectural Institute of Japan Award and in 2009 was made an Officier de L'Ordre des Arts et des Lettres in France.

- 1997 Architectural Institute of Japan Award for “Noh Stage in the Forest" First Place, AIA DuPONT Benedictus Award for “Water/Glass” (USA)
- 2001 Togo Murano Award for “Nakagawa-machi Bato Hiroshige Museum”
- 2002 Spirit of Nature Wood Architecture Award (Finland)
- 2008 Energy Performance + Architecture Award (France) Bois Magazine International Wood Architecture Award (France)
- 2008 LEAF Award (commercial category)
- 2009 Decoration Officier de L'Ordre des Arts et des Lettres (France)
- 2010 Mainichi Art Award for “Nezu Museum”
- 2011 The Minister of Education, Culture, Sports, Science and Technology's Art Encouragement Prize for "Yusuhara Wooden Bridge Museum"
- 2012 The Restaurant & Bar Design Awards, Restaurant Interior (Stand alone) for Sake No Hana (London)
- 2016 Global Award for Sustainable Architecture
- 2019 John D. Rockefeller 3rd Award
- 2019 Military Order of Savoy (Cavaliere di Gran Croce)
- 2021 Time 100
- 2024 Jan Kaplicky Lifetime Achievement Award
- 2025 Louis Kahn Award

== Publications ==
- Jodidio, Philip (2021). Kuma : Kengo Kuma, complete works 1988-today. Taschen. Köln. ISBN 978-3-8365-7512-6. OCLC 1255816679.
- Kuma, Kengo (2021). Kengo Kuma : my life as an architect in Tokyo. Polly Barton. London. ISBN 978-0-500-34361-6. OCLC 1152027821.
- Kuma, Kengo (2020). Kengo Kuma : topography. Mulgrave, Victoria, Australia. ISBN 1-86470-845-X. OCLC 1097575681.
- Kuma, Kengo (2018). Kengo Kuma : complete works. Kenneth Frampton. London. ISBN 978-0-500-34342-5. OCLC 1038456158.
- Bognár, Botond (2009). Material immaterial : the new work of Kengo Kuma. New York: Princeton Architectural Press. ISBN 1-56898-779-X. OCLC 769114606.
- Alini, Luigi (2005). Kengo Kuma : opere e progetti. Milano: Electa. ISBN 88-370-3624-8. OCLC 61237826.
