= Winthrop John Van Leuven Osterhout =

American botanist

- Born: August 7, 1871; Brooklyn, New York, US
- Died: April 9, 1964 (aged 92); New York City, US
- Education: Brown University; University of California
- Occupation: Botanist
- Spouse(s): Anna Maria Landstrom (1899); Marian Irwin (1933)
- Children: 2

Winthrop John Van Leuven Osterhout (August 2, 1871 – April 9, 1964) was an American botanist.

== Life and career ==
Osterhout was born in Brooklyn, New York, the son of Reverend John Van Leuven Osterhout, a Baptist minister, and Annie Loranthe Beman. His mother and infant sister died in 1873, leaving his father to raise him alone. However, this proved difficult and so Winthrop was given to his grandmother in Baltimore to raise until the age of eight. His father having remarried, he returned to live with John and his wife in Providence, Rhode Island.

In 1889 he entered Brown University where he developed an interest in botany. He joined the staff of Brown University in 1893, where he taught botany for two years and graduated with an M.A. in 1894. He studied at Bonn, Germany for a year, then returned home in 1896 and moved to California. In 1899 he received a Ph.D. at the University of California with a dissertation on Rhabdonia, whereupon he married his first wife, Anna Maria Landstrom. The couple had two daughters: Anna Maria and Olga.

At the University of California, he was promoted to assistant professor from 1901 to 1908 then associate professor of botany 1908–1909. In 1909, he moved to Harvard University as an assistant professor of botany, taking a step down in rank but being closer to the important Marine Biological Laboratory at Woods Hole. He rose to the rank of professor at Harvard in 1913 at the age of 42.

Spending every summer at the laboratory in Woods Hole, he was named a trustee in 1919. He was elected to the American Academy of Arts and Sciences in 1910, the American Philosophical Society in 1917, the National Academy of Sciences in 1919. From 1919 until 1964, he was the co-editor of the Journal of General Physiology, along with founder Jacques Loeb. His work appeared with the first issue, and a total of 120 of his articles were published by the journal, up until 1956.

The death of Loeb in 1924 left a vacancy at the Rockefeller Institute, and Osterhout joined the staff in 1926. There he performed much productive research. During the 1930s, he was the first to suggest the active transport mechanism of a carrier molecule for moving solutes across a cell membrane. In 1933 he married a second time, to his colleague, fellow plant physiologist Marian Irwin, the third daughter of Robert Walker Irwin and his Japanese wife, Iki.

By 1951, Osterhout's health began to fail. He died at St. Barnabas Hospital at the age of 92, after a long bout of illness.

== Awards and honors ==
Osterhout received the following honors:

- Honorary doctorate from Harvard University in 1925
- Honorary doctorate from Brown University in 1926
- Member Emeritus, Rockefeller Institute in 1939
