= Satoko Shinohara =

Japanese architect

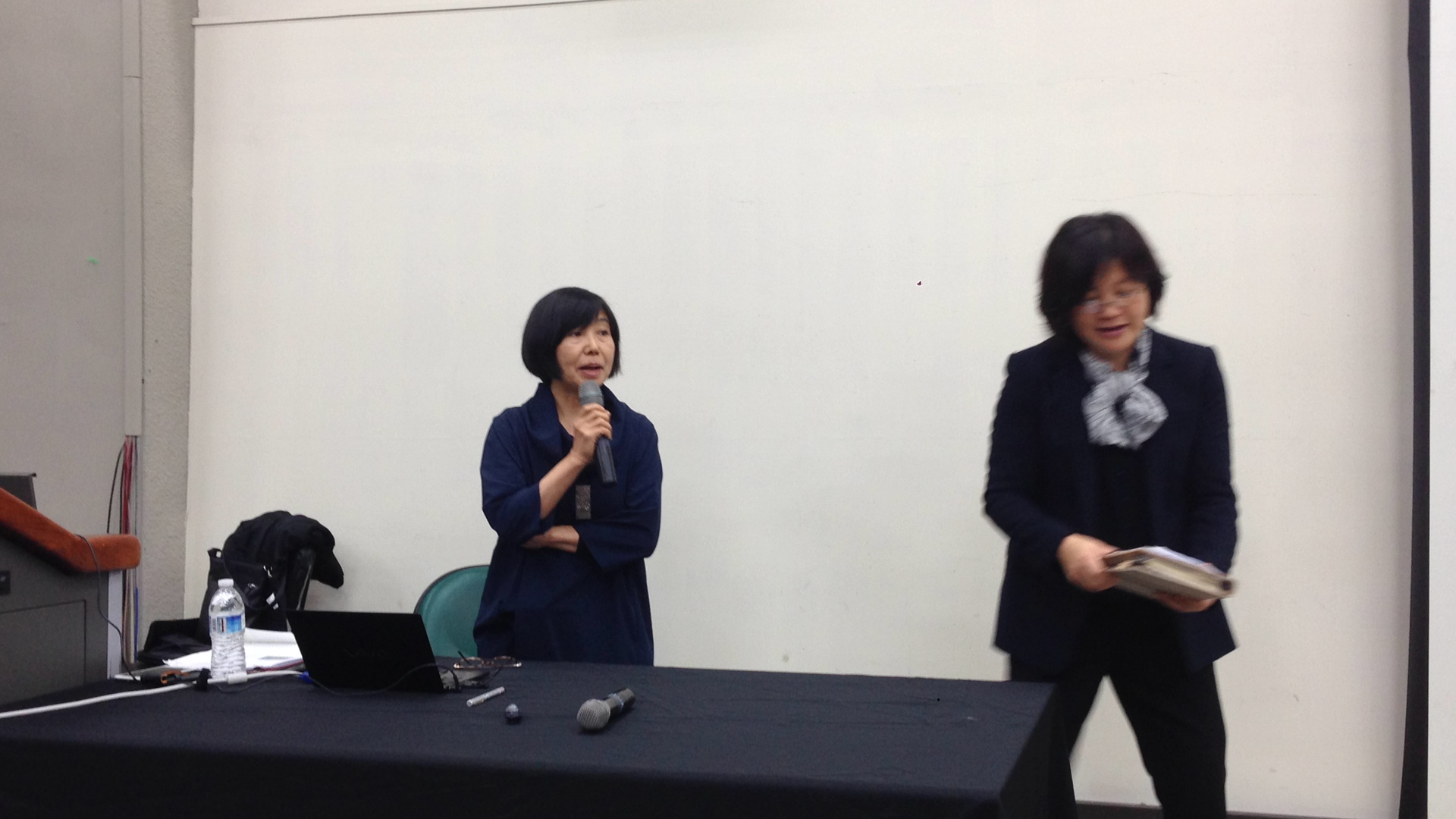
Architect Satoko Shinohara lecture at Feng Chia University

Satoko Shinohara (born September 3, 1958) is a Japanese architect, architectural educator, and architectural researcher. She became the president of Japan Women's University in 2020. She presides over Spatial Design Studio and is a published author and editor. In a career that has addressed daily life, housing, and relationships, one of Shinohara's key design tenets is that housing is inherently a social space—one that can cultivate relationships among people, place, and the environment.

== Biography and career ==
Shinohara was born in Togane City, Chiba Prefecture. In 1977 she graduated from the Chiba Prefectural Togane High School. She then studied at the Japan Women’s University, graduating in 1981 with a Bachelor’s degree from the Faculty of Home Economics. Shinohara studied in the Department of Dwelling Studies, a program that had considerable influence over Japan’s women architects, and one described as “a curriculum on ‘clothing, food, and housing’… centered upon daily living and relationships among people.” In 1983 she completed her master’s degree at the same university, writing her thesis on teahouse architecture, and studying under architect Kimiko Takahashi, who specialized in residential architecture. While completing her master’s degree, she worked part time at Amorphe Takeyama. From 1983 to 1985 she worked at Kohyama Atelier in Tokyo, where she was both the only woman and the only young architect in the office. In 1986 she co-founded Spatial Design Studio with her husband, Kengo Kuma. While Kuma left to form his own studio in 1990, Shinohara continues to operate SDS, a small firm with 6 employees. The couple has a son, Taichi, who is also an architect and works in his father’s studio.

== Educator ==
In 1997, Shinohara became a full-time lecturer in the Department of Housing under the Faculty of Home Economics at Japan Women’s University, eventually becoming professor in the same department in 2010. She became the president of the University in May 2020, when she was appointed for a four-year term. A core value of her presidency has been the restructuring and rebranding of faculties; the Faculty of Home Economics has since been renamed and reconfigured as the “Faculty of Human Sciences and Design.” Additionally, under her leadership the university has decided to admit trans women beginning in 2024. She oversees the award-winning “Shinohara Lab” for architectural design students through the Department of Housing.

== Work ==
Shinohara’s area of research is housing innovation in response to complex and changing household structures in modern Japan. She has co-authored at least six survey-style housing studies, published in The AIJ Journal of Technology and Design, in addition to numerous books and articles on the subject.

=== Small Bath House in Izu ===
A notable early work is her collaboration with Kuma from 1988 “Small Bath House in Izu.” It is considered Kuma’s first project and is highly regarded amongst retrospectives of his work, and frequently referenced. Kuma scholar Botond Bognar describes it as such:

... the Small Bath House in Izu ... remains one of his early remarkable designs, and whose many features, including the use of natural materials such as wood and bamboo, would return in some of his later buildings. Although not as refined as his more recent works, this project ... is an unpretentious construction with a spatial and formal composition that is as light and refreshing as it is non-monumental.

Bognar also describes its "unmistakeably fragmentary composition,” alluding to the “architecture of fragmentation” that he would continue to explore in later work. The model for the bath house, made of corrugated cardboard, was showcased in the exhibition “The Japanese House: Architecture and Life after 1945,” at the National Museum of Modern Art Tokyo.

=== Corte M Renovation ===
According to Shinohara, the Corte M Apartment building project in 1994 was “the starting point for [her] current work.” This 443.4 m^{2} (4,773 sq ft) renovation project in Chiba added common spaces to the ground floor level of two buildings of studio apartments, activating the courtyard in between, and enabling interaction between the residents and the local community. This ethos of “building relationships between people” exemplified the focus of Shinohara’s research work.

=== Share Buildings ===
In the early 2010s, Shinohara began garnering attention for her research and work designing “share” houses, a response to the growing percentage of single-person households in Tokyo (in 2012, 50 percent of Tokyo-ites lived alone), the lack of available space, and the potentially unnecessary repetition of services across private studio apartments. Along with practical concerns, the style of living these buildings addresses diminishing socialization, as well as sustainability.

SHAREyaraicho, co-designed with Ayano Uchimura of A Studio in 2012, is considered “the first purpose-built share house in [Tokyo],”^{[27]} creating “an alternative to the dominant single-dweller housing typology.”^{[28]} The three-storey 77 m^{2} (830 sq ft) footprint building, with interiors finished simply with plywood and polycarbonate, features 7 private bedrooms with communal living, kitchen, and bath. As in the Corte M renovation, SHAREyaraicho intends to reach out into the neighbourhood:

The idea of communal living and nurturing connections extends beyond Share Yaraicho’s residents themselves to the local community. At Share Yaraicho there is no door; instead, a soft plastic membrane that zips and unzips mediates the inside and outside worlds. 'I think the facade and ground floor of buildings are very important because it is through these that the buildings come into contact with the outside, neighbours and society,' Shinohara says. Step through the membrane and enter the building’s entrance hall – an airy 10-metre-high transition zone that operates as an accessible space to both “invite and unite” neighbours and friends. Functioning as a flexible event space and activity venue for both Share Yaraicho residents and the surrounding neighbourhood, the hall has hosted everything from local bi-monthly urban design talks by residents to Halloween parties for the wider community.

The work, in its unique approach to collective housing, is highlighted in many magazine features and is showcased in the book Future Living, Collective Housing in Japan. In her analysis of the rediscovery of traditional Japanese forms of collective living, Claudia Hildner describes SHAREyaraicho, in terms of its many common zones and shared ethos, as "a vision of urban living that is at once autonomous and rooted in community." The impulse of linking architecture with the broader community is also found in SHAREtenjincho, a 9-story reinforced concrete building built in 2021 in Kagurazaka, that represents a collaboration between Shinohara, Uchimura, and Shinohara’s son Taichi, under his company Tailand. It is described by the architects as:

a mixed-use building ... whose main concept is ‘sharing’. The first floor consists of a restaurant; The second floor consists of office space; above these more public-facing levels, the third to ninth floors are composed of residencies. These three types of programs are shared by everyone. For example, the restaurant is used by different chefs who specialize in different types of cuisine and the office is shared by multiple workers with free-address desks. The residencies themselves consist of nine private rooms with shared living, kitchen, shower, and working areas. To vitalize the façade, the sharing concept is emphasized via external stairs that connect the terraces of every floor.

Taichi specifies that the restaurant intends to be a community generating space, catalyzing the kind of vibrant dining life that can be found in a European town square.

Taichi’s website also describes five other projects he has worked on under the SHARE umbrella, from offices, to residential renovations, and restaurants.

== Spatial Design Studio list of work ==
Name	Use	Location	Year
Reinan Kindergarten	Public	Chiba	1993
Corte M Renovation	Housing	Chiba	1994
S-House	Residence	Tokyo	1995
I-House	Residence	Tokyo	1995
Y-House	Residence	Chiba	1996
Rigato F	Housing	Chiba	1998
Tougane 4th Nursery	Public	Chiba	1998
T-House	Residence	Kanagawa	1999
Osakaizumiotsu Nagisa Housing Project	Housing	Osaka	1999
Tou-Kyo	Residence	Kanagawa	1999
T-Office	Office	Tokyo	2000
Aperto	Housing	Chiba	2000
M-House	Residence	Tokyo	2001
E-House	Residence	Chiba	2001
Superar Kinatu	Housing	Tokyo	2003
Rete Tamaplaza	Housing	Kanagawa	2003
Funabashi Kaijin	Residence	Chiba	2004
Slash/kitasenzou	Residence	Tokyo	2006
EN4185	Residence	Tokyo	2006
Shoko	Residence	Kyoto	2006
Stesso	Residence	Chiba	2007
A home for 1 person	Residence	unbuilt	2008
Yakuendai Ballet Studio	Other	Chiba	2010
Katsuranochaya	Restaurant	Nagano	2010
Takeuchi Clinic	Other	Chiba	2010
Nouvelle Akabanedai	Housing	Tokyo	2010
Maglia Jiyugaoka	Residence	Tokyo	2011
SHAREyaraicho	Housing	Tokyo	2012
Uji	Residence	Kyoto	2014
Michi-No-Eki Hota Shogakko	Other	Chiba	2015
Sankaku	Residence	Yamanishi	2016
Sasu • Ke	Residence	Kanagawa	2017
Encher Kinuta	Residence	Tokyo	2017
Daita Kindergarten	Public	Tokyo	2017
K-House	Residence	Tokyo	2018
SHAREtenjincho	Mixed Use	Tokyo	2021
House in Nezu	Residence	Tokyo	2021
Solana Takanawadai	Housing	Tokyo	2021
Gokakuken	Residence	Kyoto	2021

== Authored books ==
Reading the Boundaries of Housing: Field Notes on People, Places, and Architecture. Shokokusha, October 2007. ISBN 9784395010011

Asian Commons: Connections and Designs of Collective Housing. Heibonsha, October 2021. ISBN 9784582544695

Ohitoro House. Heibonsha, 2015. ISBN 978-4582835137

== Co-authored books ==
Satoko Shinohara, Kei Sasai, and Fumiko Iida. Life Culture Theory. Asakura Shoten, Series "Life Science," April 2002. ISBN 4254605919

Satoko Shinohara, Sumiko Ohashi, Masao Koizumi, and Lifestyle Study Group. Changing Families and Changing Homes. Shokokusha, August 2002. ISBN 4395006272

Satoko Shinohara Laboratory, Japan Women's University. Share House Encyclopedia. Shokokusha, December 2017. ISBN 9784395320981

Satoko Shinohara, Izumi Kuroishi, Toshio Otsuki, and Osamu Tsukihashi. Encyclopedia for Living. Shokokusha, April 2020. ISBN 978-4-395-32068-4

== Partial list of awards ==
Name	Year	Project
Selected Architectural Designs of AIJ	1999	Y-House
Award of Tokyo Society of Architects & Building Engineers	2000	Rigato F
Selected Architectural Designs of AIJ	2001	Rigato F
Selected Architectural Designs of AIJ	2001	Osakaizumiotsu Nagisa Housing
Tokyo Architecture Award	2002	Tou-Kyo
Good Design Award	2003	Superar Kinatu
Selected Architectural Designs of AIJ	2006	Rete Tamaplaza
Selected Architectural Designs of AIJ	2007	Funabashi Kaijin
Selected Architectural Designs of AIJ	2009	Slash/kitasenzoku
IESNA IIDA Award of Merit	2013	SHAREyaraicho
Yamanashi Architectural Culture Awards	2017	Sankaku
