= 1915 Japanese general election =

- 25 March 1915

All 381 seats in the House of Representatives 191 seats needed for a majority
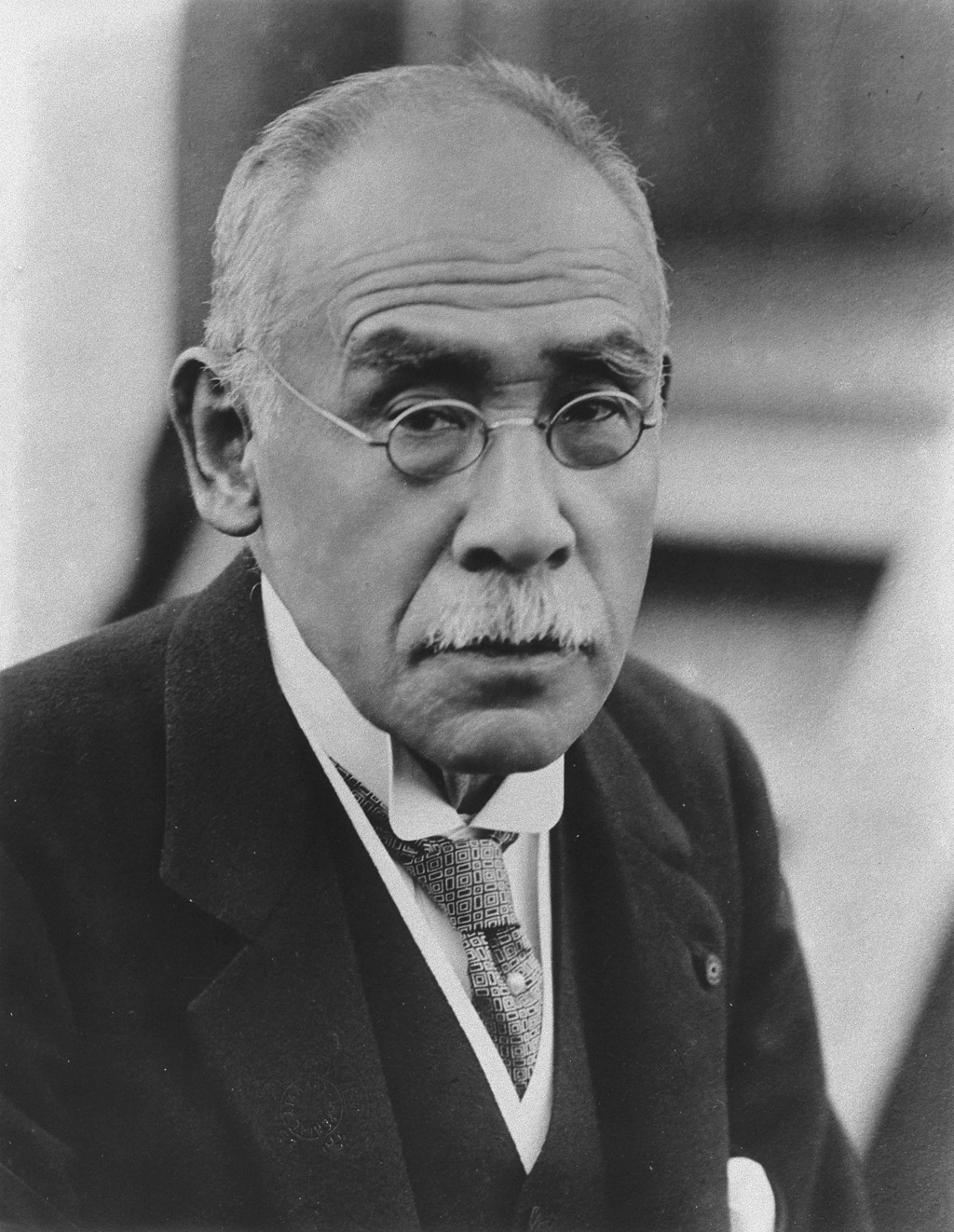

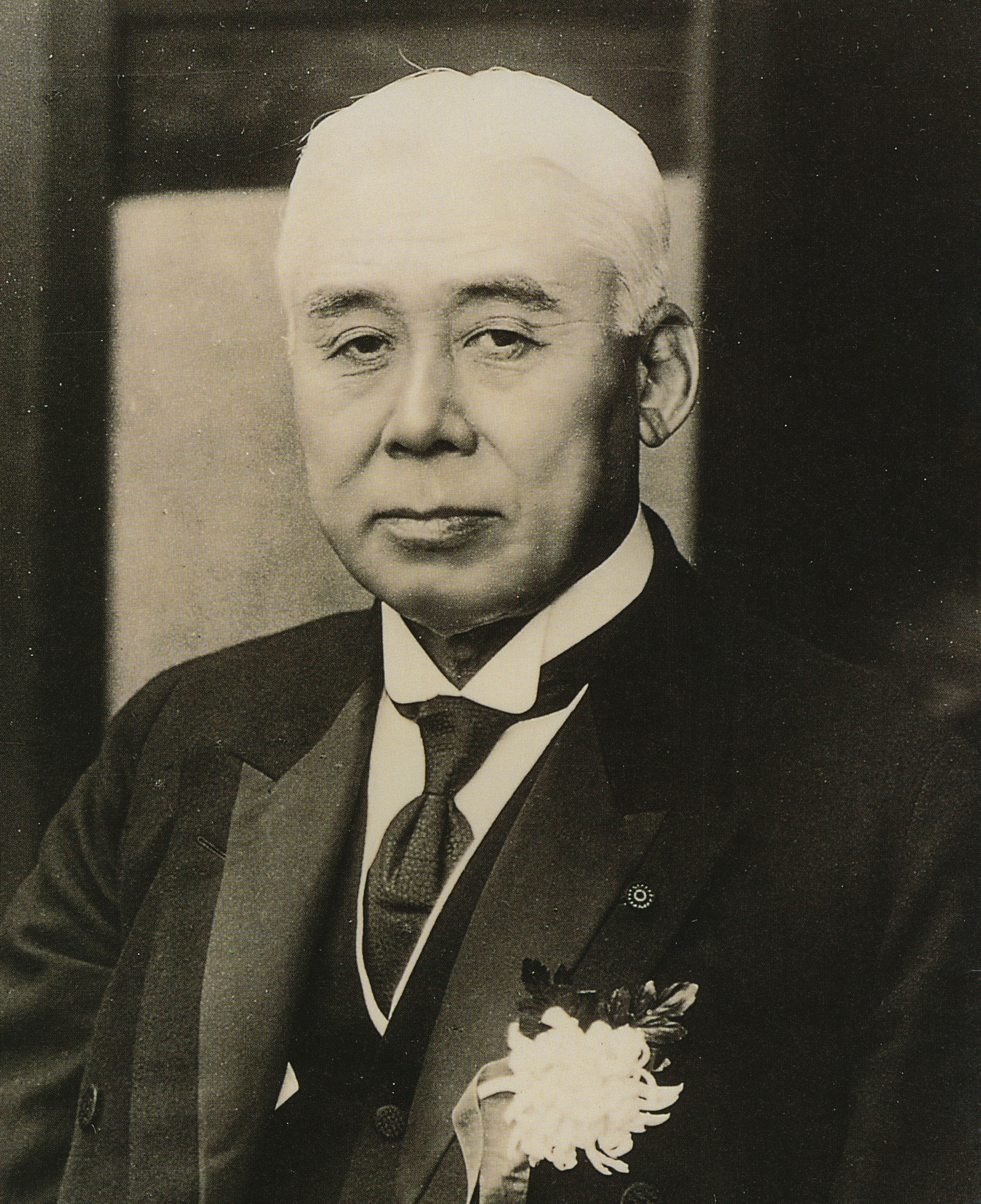

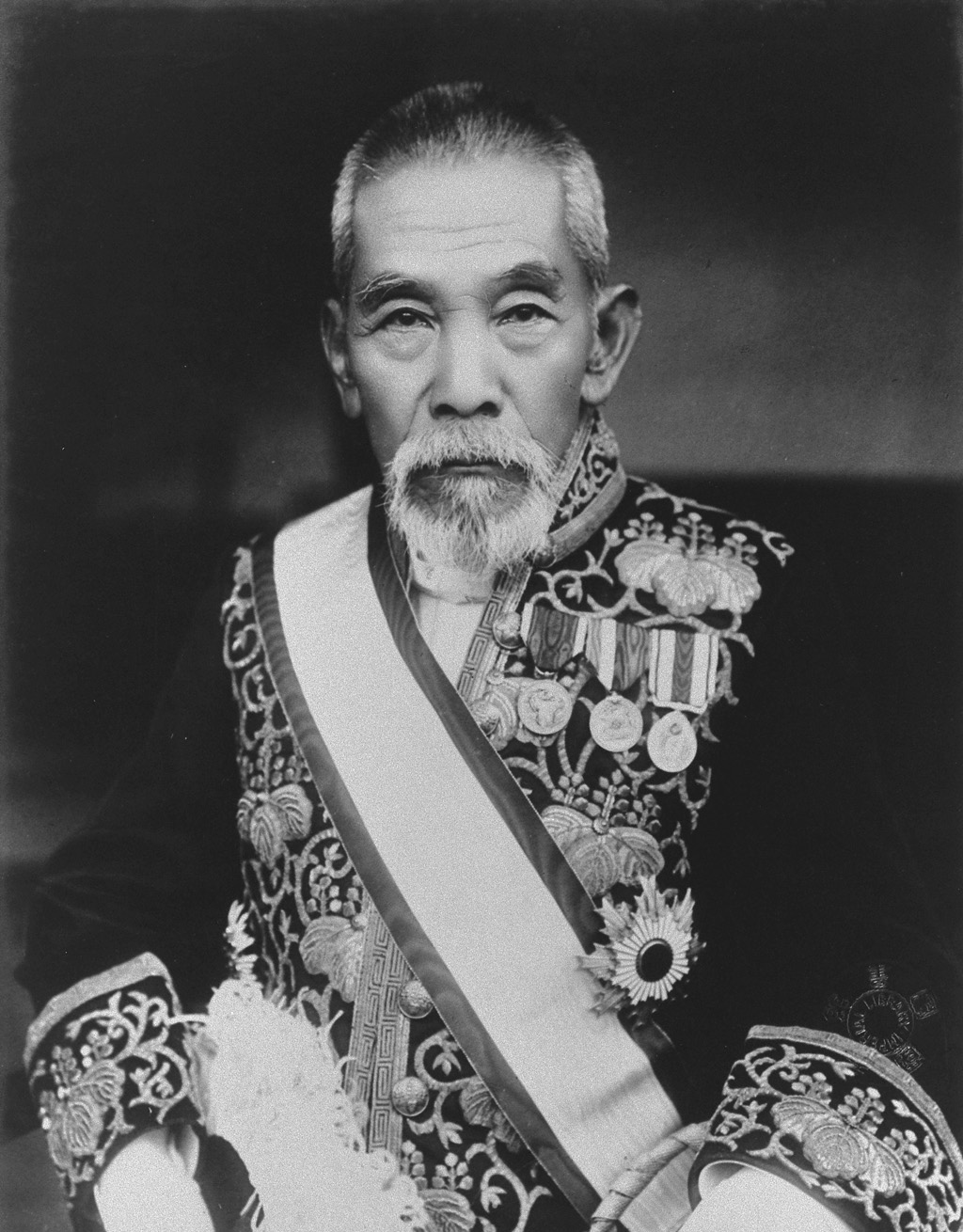

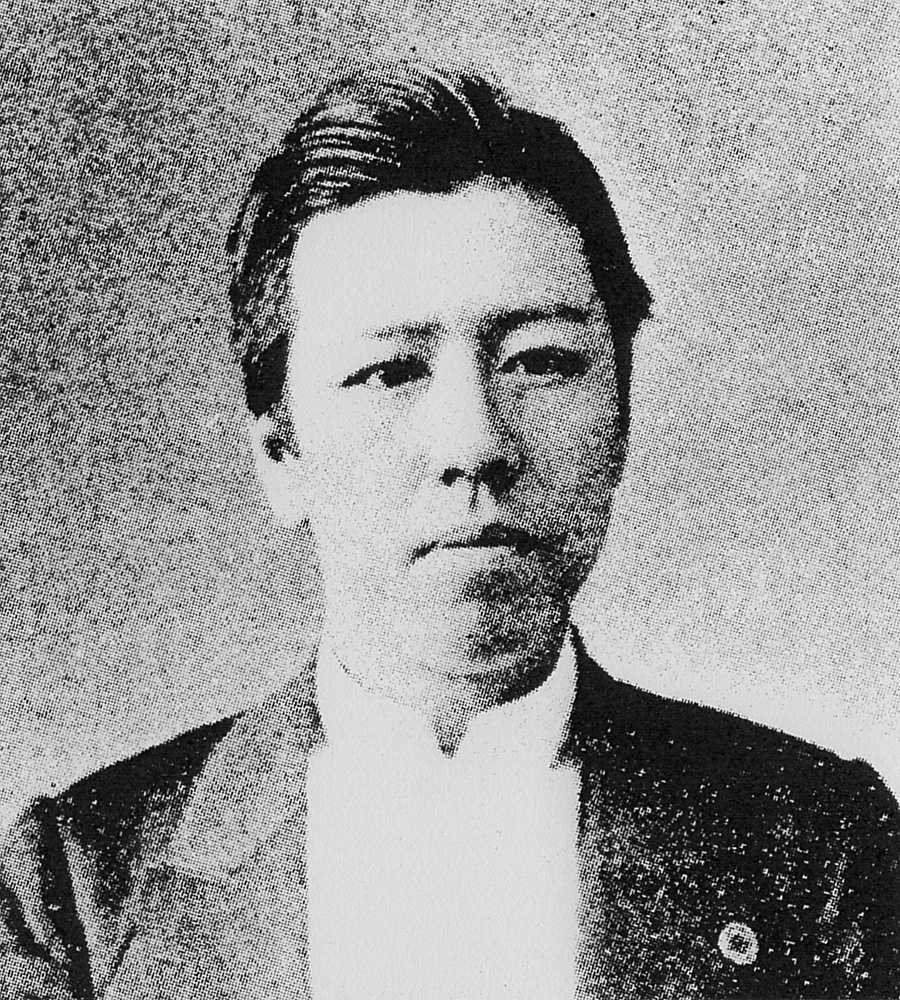
	First party	Second party	Third party
Leader	Kato Takaaki	Hara Takashi	Inukai Tsuyoshi
Party	Rikken Dōshikai	Rikken Seiyūkai	Rikken Kokumintō
Last election	Did not exist	51.52%, 209 seats	28.50%, 95 seats
Seats won	153	108	27
Seat change	New	▼101	▼68
Popular vote	523,228	446,934	106,445
Percentage	36.92%	31.54%	7.51%
Swing	New	▼19.98pp	▼20.99pp
	Fourth party	Fifth party
Leader		Ichishima Kenkichi
Party	Chūseikai	Okuma Kōenkai
Seats won	33	12
Seat change	New	New
Popular vote	101,970	55,684
Percentage	7.20%	3.93%
Swing	New	New
Prime Minister before election
Ōkuma Shigenobu
Dōshikai
Prime Minister after election
Ōkuma Shigenobu
Dōshikai

General elections were held in Japan on 25 March 1915. The Rikken Dōshikai party emerged as the largest party in the House of Representatives, winning 153 of the 381 seats.

== Electoral system ==
The 381 members of the House of Representatives were elected in 51 multi-member constituencies based on prefectures and cities. Voting was restricted to men aged over 25 who paid at least 10 yen a year in direct taxation.

== Results ==
Party	Votes	%	Seats	+/–
Rikken Dōshikai	523,228	36.92	153	New
Rikken Seiyūkai	446,934	31.54	108	–101
Rikken Kokumintō	106,445	7.51	27	–68
Chūseikai	101,970	7.20	33	New
Okuma Kōenkai	55,684	3.93	12	New
Others	182,814	12.90	48	+2
Total	1,417,075	100.00	381	0
Valid votes	1,417,075	99.47		
Invalid/blank votes	7,570	0.53		
Total votes	1,424,645	100.00		
Registered voters/turnout	1,546,411	92.13		
Source: Mackie & Rose, Statistics Bureau of Japan
