= Seikō Club =

Political party in Japan

The Seikō Club (Japanese: 正交倶楽部, "Fairness and Friendship Club") was a political party in Japan.

== History ==
The party was established in December 1918 as a merger of the Seiwa Club and a group of eight independent members of the National Diet, and was initially an "Independent Group". In March 1919 it was renamed the Seikō Club, by which time it had 33 Diet members. It did poorly in the May 1920 general elections due to a new electoral law that replaced multi-member constituencies with single-member ones. The following month its last four members merged with the Shinseikai's sole member and 20 independent members to form the Kōshin Club.
