= Tomi Kōra =

Japanese politician

- 高良 とみ
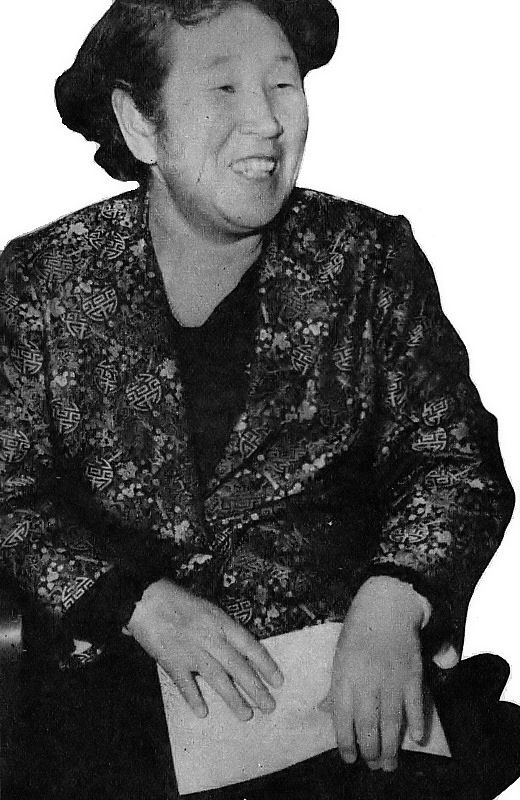
- Kōra in 1953

Member of the House of Councillors
- In office 3 May 1947 – 2 May 1959
- Preceded by: Constituency established
- Succeeded by: Multi-member district
- Constituency: National district

Personal details
- Born: Tomi Wada (和田 とみ, Wada Tomi); 1 July 1896 Toyama Prefecture, Japan
- Died: 17 January 1993 (aged 96)
- Resting place: Tama Cemetery
- Party: Ryokufūkai (1949–1959)
- Other political affiliations: Democratic (1947–1949)
- Children: Rumiko Kōra
- Occupation: Politician; Academic psychologist
- Known for: Peace and women's rights activism, second Japanese woman to attain a PhD in psychology

Academic background
- Education: Columbia University (PhD 1922); Barnard College (M 1920); Japan Women's University (B 1917)
- Thesis: An Experimental Study of Hunger in its Relation to Activity (1922)
- Doctoral advisor: Edward Thorndike
- Other advisors: John B. Watson; Curt Richter
- Influences: Tsuruko Haraguchi; Rabindranath Tagore

Academic work
- Discipline: Psychology
- Institutions: Japan Women's University (Professor); Kyushu University (Researcher)

Tomi Kōra (Japanese: 高良 とみ, Hepburn: Kōra Tomi; July 1, 1896 – January 17, 1993) was a Japanese psychologist, peace activist, and politician. She published under the name Tomiko Kōra (高良 とみ, Kōra Tomiko).

== Early life and education ==
Kōra was born Tomi Wada (Note: 和田 とみ, Wada Tomi) on July 1, 1896, in Toyama Prefecture. She graduated from the Japan Women's University in 1917. While a student, she attended the funeral of Tsuriko Haraguchi, held at the university. Haraguchi was a psychologist and the first Japanese woman to obtain a PhD; Kōra was reportedly inspired by Haraguchi to continue her advanced studies in psychology.

Like Haraguchi, she attended Columbia University, earning her master's degree in 1920 and her PhD in 1922. At Columbia, she collaborated with Curt Richter to conduct her experiments on the effects of hunger. Kōra's doctoral dissertation, completed under the supervision of Edward L. Thorndike, was titled An Experimental Study of Hunger in its Relation to Activity. She was the second Japanese woman to obtain a PhD in psychology, after Haraguchi.

== Career ==
After returning to Japan, Kōra worked as an assistant in a clinical psychiatry laboratory and taught at Kyushu Imperial University. She was promoted to associate professor, but was met with resistance because she was unmarried at the time. She resigned from the institution in 1927 and took a post at Japan Women's University, where she became a professor.

Kōra was a member of the Japanese Christian Women's Peace Movement, and travelled to China. There, in January 1932, she met the Chinese writers Lu Xun and Xu Guangping at a bookstore owned by the Japanese Kanzō Uchiyama; shortly after, Lu Xun wrote a poem for her.

Kōra was elected as a Councillor in the 1947 Japanese House of Councillors election, as a member of the Democratic Party. She switched to the Ryokufūkai party in 1949, and served in the House of Councillors for 12 years.

In April 1952, Kōra attended the International Economic Conference in Moscow. Per a request from the US embassy, the Japanese Foreign Ministry had refused to issue passports to those who wished to travel to the Soviet Union; Kōra got around this restriction by travelling to Moscow through Paris, Copenhagen, and Helsinki. They met with vice-minister of the Chinese Ministry of Foreign Trade Lei Rei-min and were invited to Beijing. At the time, the Japanese government did not recognize the legitimacy of the PRC government. That May, she visited Beijing as a member of the House of Councillors Special Committee for the Repatriation of Overseas Japanese. The visit was a diplomatic breakthrough, resulting in the first PRC–Japan private-sector trade agreement (signed June 1, 1952) and the resumption of the repatriation of Japanese left in China following the end of World War II. Both praise and opposition greeted the trade agreement from Japanese legislators.

Kōra spent four days as a guest at the Women's International Zionist Organization in Israel in April 1960.

== Personal life ==
In 1929, Kōra married psychiatrist Takehisa Kōra. (Note: 高良 武久, Kōra Takehisa) They had three daughters, including the poet Rumiko Kōra. (Note: 高良 留美子, Kōra Rumiko) Kōra was a practising Quaker.
