= Hideko Inoue =

Japanese educator and peace activist

- 井上秀子
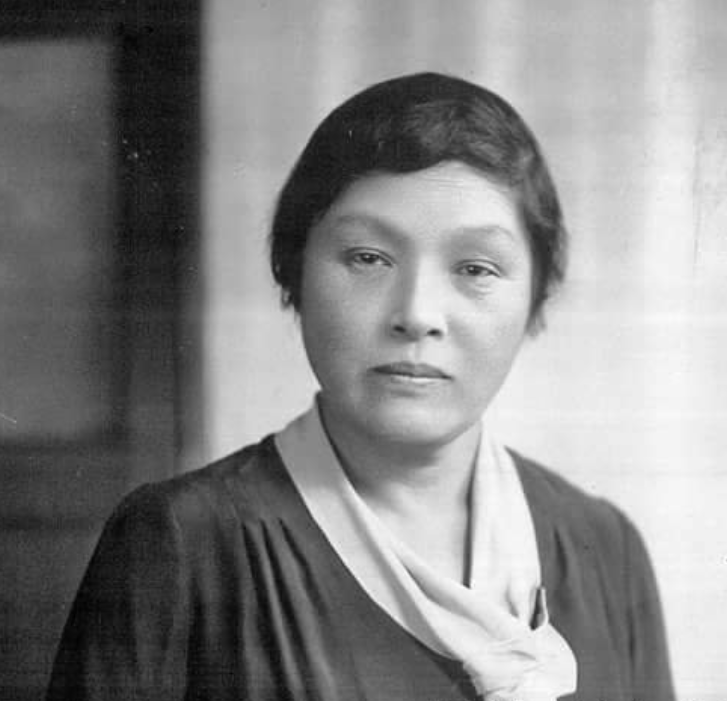
- Inoue, 1931
- Born: 6 January 1875; Funajo Village, Hyōgo Prefecture, Japan
- Died: 19 July 1963 (aged 88)
- Other names: Hideko Inouye, Hide Inoue, Hide Inouye
- Education: Japan Women's University
- Occupations: academic, internationalist, pacifist
- Years active: 1908-1950s
- Spouse: Sadako Adachi (m. 1895)
- Children: Shina Inoue Kan

Hideko Inoue (also Hideko Inouye, Japanese: 井上秀 6 January 1875 – 19 July 1963) was a Japanese educator and peace activist. She taught home economics at Japan Women's University and served as the first woman president of the school from 1931–1946. Active in the peace movement she led the Japanese affiliate of the Women's International League for Peace and Freedom and was one of the leading feminists supporting internationalism in the interwar era. In the 1930s she changed her focus to Pan-Asian cooperation and at the end of the decade was appointed to the Ministry of Greater East Asia to work on educational reforms. In the 1940s, she was decorated by the Emperor of Japan but lost her presidency at Japan Women's University in 1946 when she was purged by the U. S. Occupation Administration. She remained involved in education until the mid-1950s.

== Early life ==
Hideko Inoue was born on 6 January 1875 in Kasuga, Hyōgo Prefecture, Japan to Kahei Inoue. Her family was very affluent and influential. Upon completing elementary school, she entered the Hikami Senior School in Kashihara in 1885, and was one of only three girls in the school. One of her teachers there, Makiko Imai, encouraged Inoue to continue her education, but her father felt that she had had adequate education for a girl. With her grandmother's encouragement, he finally allowed her in 1890 to begin attending the Kyoto First High School, the oldest girls' high school in Japan. As her English scores were poor, Inoue began studying English to prepare, taking both formal classes and private instruction. One of the other students at the school was Kameko Hirooka, daughter of the founder of Japan Women's University, Asako Hirooka and she became close to the family.

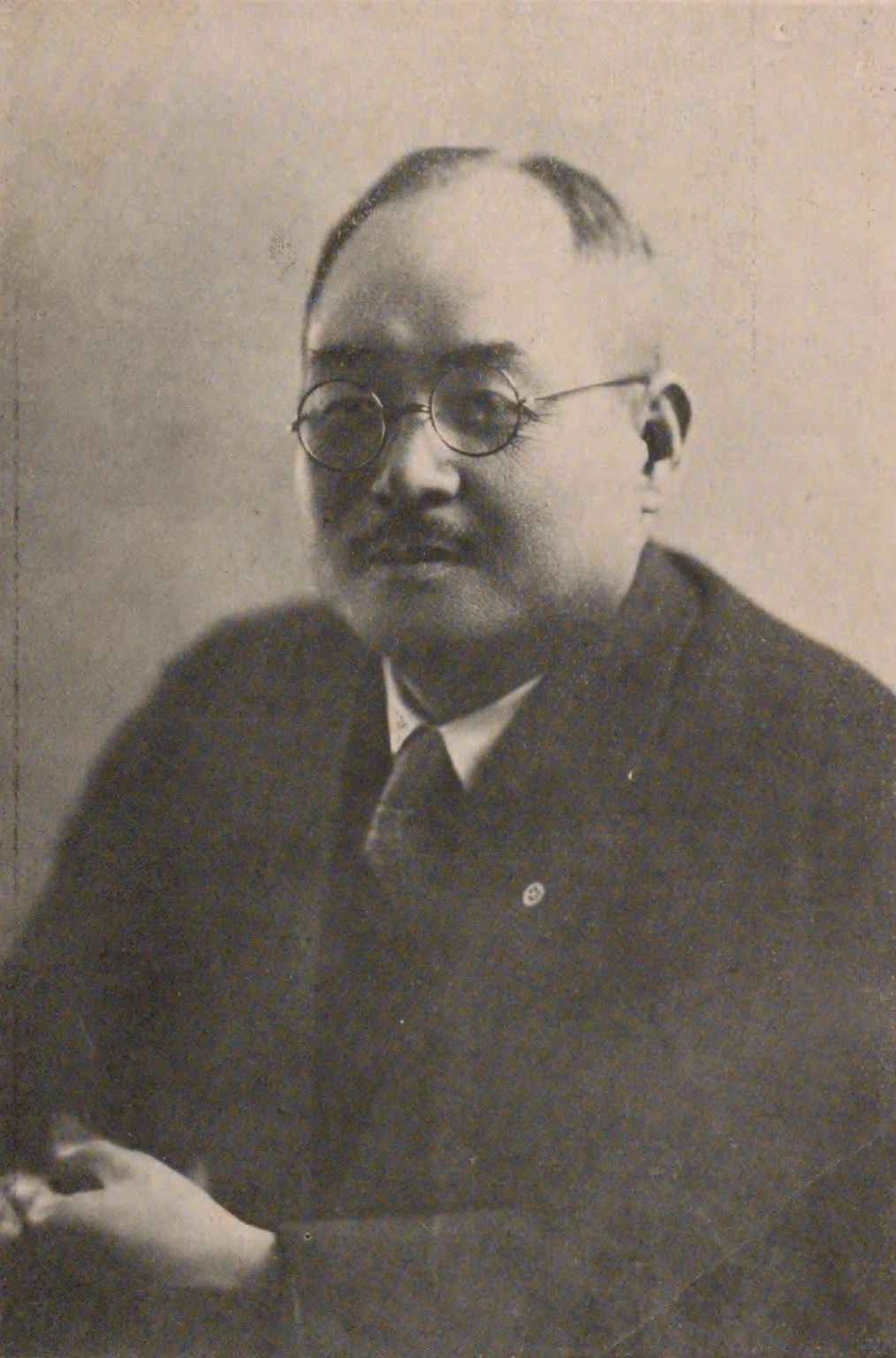
Masaji Inoue

In 1895, Inoue married Sadako Adachi, who was adopted by the Inoue family and took the name of Masaji Inoue, as there were no sons in the family to carry on the family name. After giving birth to her oldest daughter, Shina in 1899 or 1900, Inoue enrolled in 1901 at Japan Women's University to study home economics. When she graduated, she became the secretary general of alumni association and then with the encouragement of Hirooka went to the United States to further her education at Teachers College, Columbia University and the Chicago Normal School.

== Career ==
In 1908, when she returned from the United States, Inoue worked as a professor at the Japan Women's University and helped establish, along with Jinzo Naruse, the field of home economics in Japan. In 1911 she became the head of the Japan Women's Peace Association, an affiliate of the Women's International League for Peace and Freedom. In 1913, through her involvement with the alumni association, Inoue proposed that the graduates hold fundraisers to support a day care system modeled on those she had seen in the United States. The association held music performances and sold items at a bazaar to pay for the operation of the first day care center in Japan, which opened that year in the Sugamo neighborhood of Tokyo. She also founded the Women's Association for the Cultivation of International Friendship to urge women's cooperation globally.

By the 1920s, Inoue was the leading woman in the internationalist movement and was a visible supporter of world peace. As the head of the Japanese Women's Peace League, she attended the Women's World Conference on Arms Limitation, in Washington, D. C. in 1921. She was by that time, head of the home economics department, and traveled to the conference with her secretary, Dr. Marian Irwin, graduate of Bryn Mawr College. At the conference, she spoke on the need for women's education and political rights, as well as for arms control and international peace policies. She believed that if Japan agreed with disarmament policies that would make Japanese immigration more attractive in the United States and lessen the overcrowding at home. She was also the lead delegate to the 1928 Pan-Pacific Women's Conference. In 1931, she became the first woman president of the Japan Women's University and in 1933 helped organize the International Women's and Children Exposition.

In the interwar period Inoue and her husband both supported internationalism, but at the dawn of World War II, they both supported Japan's expansionism and a Pan-Asian focus under Japanese leadership. After the Second Sino-Japanese War, Inoue shifted towards pro-Asian policies and in 1937, when touring Nazi Germany, was a vocal supporter of the Nazi's Strength Through Joy program. That same year, when touring the United States she was struck by the hypocrisy of immigration bans because there was a surplus of undeveloped land. When she returned from abroad, she worked in the Ministry of Greater East Asia on educational reforms. Her lectures of the time showed she had not completely abandoned internationalism, as she argued that rationing foreign edibles which had become staples of the culture would be problematic. She also continued to press for reforms for women's education, believing that even within the cultural context of women's subservience, education was needed to advance societal modernization.

In 1939, Inoue, along with other leading women like Kiuchi Kyo and Yoshioka Yayoi, established the women’s wing of the National Language Association, an organization designed to improve and preserve the Japanese language. The goal of the women's wing was to promote the use of feminine language to embody their gender in their courteous demeanor and speech. In 1940, Inoue was one of four women appointed to serve in the National Spiritual Mobilization Movement. She was decorated by the Emperor of Japan and held many varied government posts until the war ended.

In 1946, Inoue was purged by the U. S. Occupation Administration from her presidency at the Japan Women's University. Ostensibly, her removal was based on an affiliation with the Imperial Rule Assistance Association because in 1941 she was appointed as the vice president of the Dai Nippon Seishonen-dan, (Greater Japan Youth and Child Group). This group was made of up school administrators for the purpose of creating activities for youth participation in the war effort. They organized such events as aid to soldiers' families, crop harvests, savings drives, and training for home and national defense. Inoue's defense of her actions was that she had opposed both her appointment to the Youth and Child Group and its affiliation with the Imperial Rule Assistance Association, but she became one of the few women purged in the period of occupation.

In 1954, she accompanied Dr. Hiro Ohashi on a study tour of the social services and home economics departments of Indiana University, Iowa State College, Michigan State University, and the University of Chicago, among others. They took ideas regarding integrating physical sciences into the home economics courses, updating appliances, and adding audio-visual materials home to add to the curricula of the Women's University.

== Death and legacy ==
Inoue died on 19 July 1963. There is a carved bust of Inoue on display at the Funagi Elementary School in Tanba.
