= Kōyū Club =

Political party in Japan

The Kōyū Club (Japanese: 公友倶楽部, "Friendship Club") was a political party in Japan.

== History ==
The party was established in the build-up to the March 1915 general elections as Okuma Kōenkai, a group of Waseda University graduates campaigning for Prime Minister Ōkuma Shigenobu. It won twelve seats, and upon entering the House of Representatives, became the Mushozoku Dan (Independents Group), with a further 45 National Diet members joining it.

In November the party was renamed Kōyū Club, by which time it had 56 Diet members. It was involved in talks regarding the formation of the Kenseikai in September 1916, although only around half of the Kōyū Club joined the new party. The Kōyū Club continued to exist until December, at which point it merged with a group of independents to form the Kōseikai.
