= Marian Irwin Osterhout =

American plant physiologist

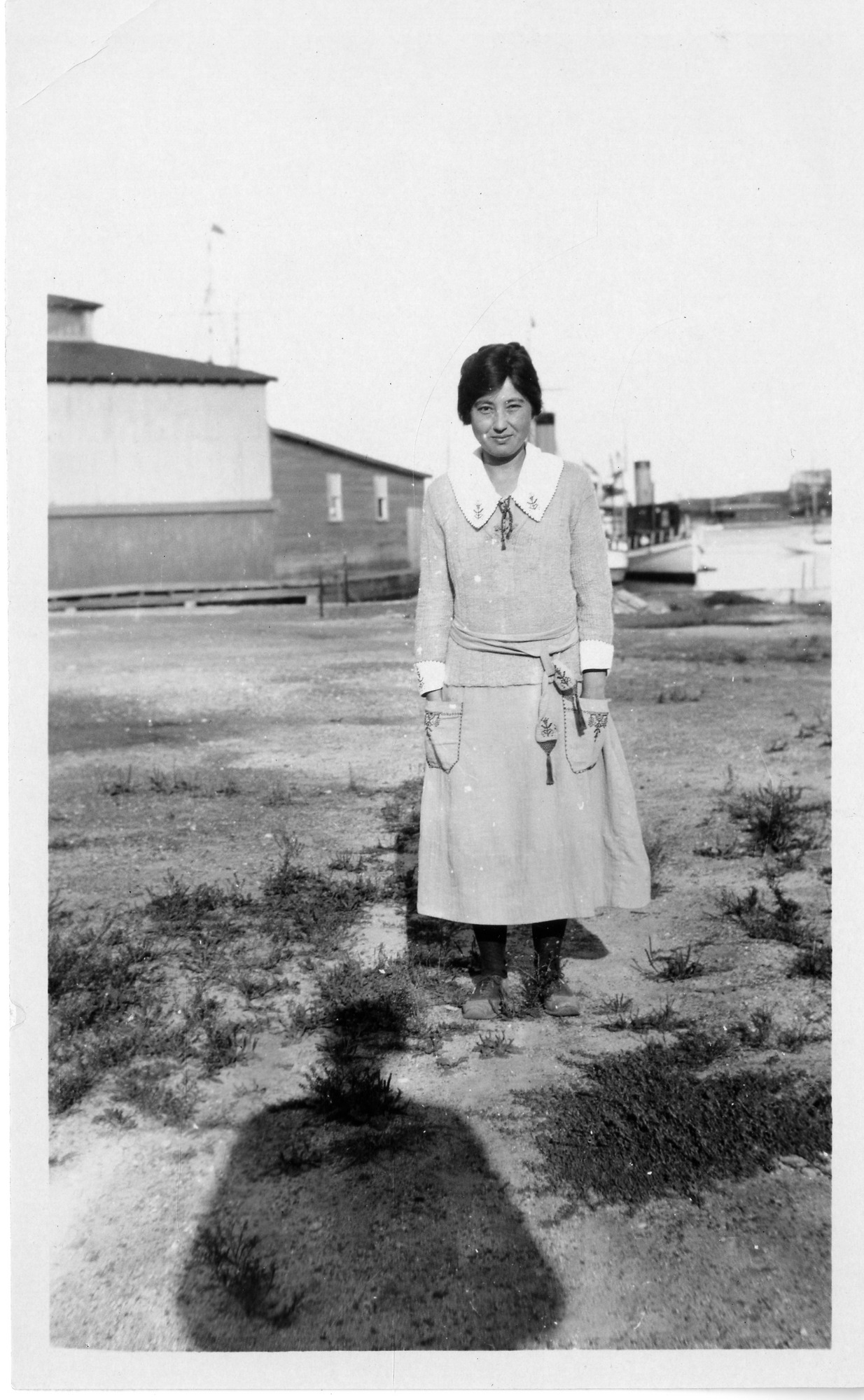
Marian Irwin Osterhout

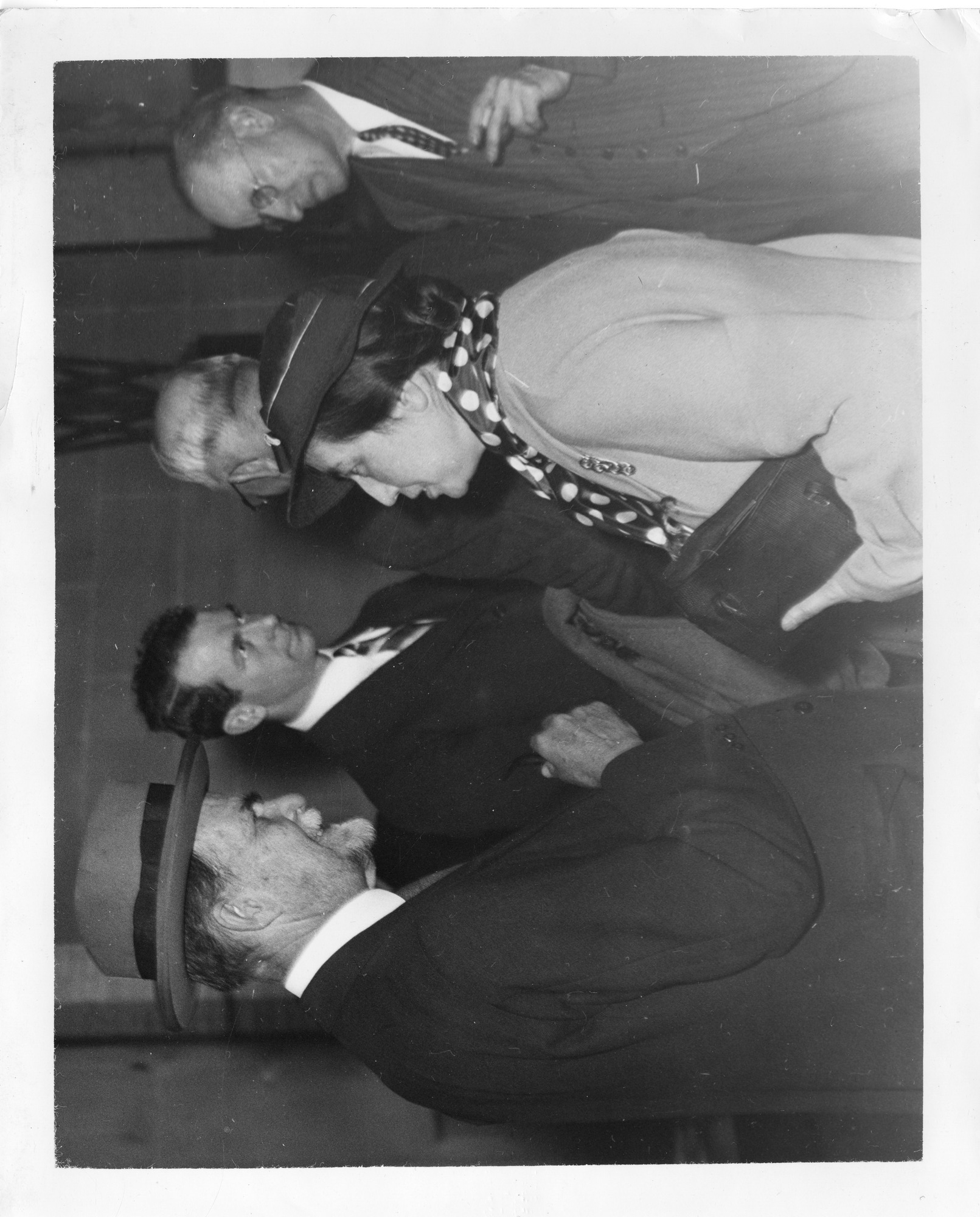
Left to right: Thomas Hunt Morgan, Linus Pauling and Marian Irwin Osterhout

Marian Irwin Osterhout (June 16, 1888 – May 10, 1973), was an American plant physiologist born in Japan. She was the first woman to receive a National Research Council fellowship.

== Early life and education ==
Marian Irwin was born in Tokyo, the daughter of Iki Takechi Irwin and Robert Walker Irwin. Her mother was a Japanese noblewoman, the daughter of a samurai; her father was an American diplomat, the son of William W. Irwin and a direct descendant of Benjamin Franklin. Her older sister Bella Irwin founded a school in Tokyo. Their aunt, Agnes Irwin, was also an educator, the first dean of Radcliffe College.

Marian Irwin was educated in Japan and at Bryn Mawr College, where she earned a bachelor's degree in 1913. She earned a doctoral degree in biology, at Radcliffe College in 1919, as a student of George Howard Parker. Her dissertation title was "Effect of Electrolytes and Non-electrolytes on Organisms in Relation to Sensory Stimulation and Respiration."

== Career ==
After graduate school, Marian Irwin attended the National Conference for the Limitation of Armaments in 1921, as assistant to professor Hideko Inouye, President of the Woman's Peace Organization of Japan. She became the first woman to receive a National Research Council fellowship, which she held at Harvard from 1923 to 1925.

Marian Irwin Osterhout was a paid researcher at the Rockefeller Institute from 1925 to 1933 (and unpaid after that for many years, because she was married to another scientist there), specializing in cell permeability, especially the penetration and accumulation of dyes. She was a member of the Woods Hole Oceanographic Institution, and wrote about fifty scientific papers for publication before she married. She also assisted her husband in his research, and they traveled and wrote together.

== Personal life ==
Marian Irwin married fellow plant scientist Winthrop John Van Leuven Osterhout (1871-1964), in 1933. She died 1973, aged 84 years, in New York City. Her gravesite is with Osterhout's, in a Philadelphia churchyard.
