= Kōseikai =

Political party in Japan

The Kōseikai (Japanese: 公正会, "Fairness Association") was a political party in Japan.

== History ==
The party was established in December 1916 by 36 National Diet members as a merger of a group of independents and the remaining members of the Kōyū Club who had not joined the new Kenseikai when it was established in September. However, it was dissolved the following month in 1917, and several of its members were amongst the founders of the Ishinkai after the April 1917 elections.
