= Ishinkai =

1917 political party in Japan

The Ishinkai (Japanese: 維新会, 'Restoration Society') was a short-lived political party in Japan.

== History ==
The party was established in June 1917 by 43 independent members of the National Diet elected in the April elections, some of whom had previously been members of the Kōseikai. It was pro-government, and supported Prime Minister Terauchi Masatake.

In October 1917 the party merged with a group of 12 independent Diet members known as the "Kansai Group" to form the Shinseikai.
