= Japan Women's University =

Private women's university in Tokyo

Coordinates: 35°43′01″N 139°43′14″E

- Japan Women's University
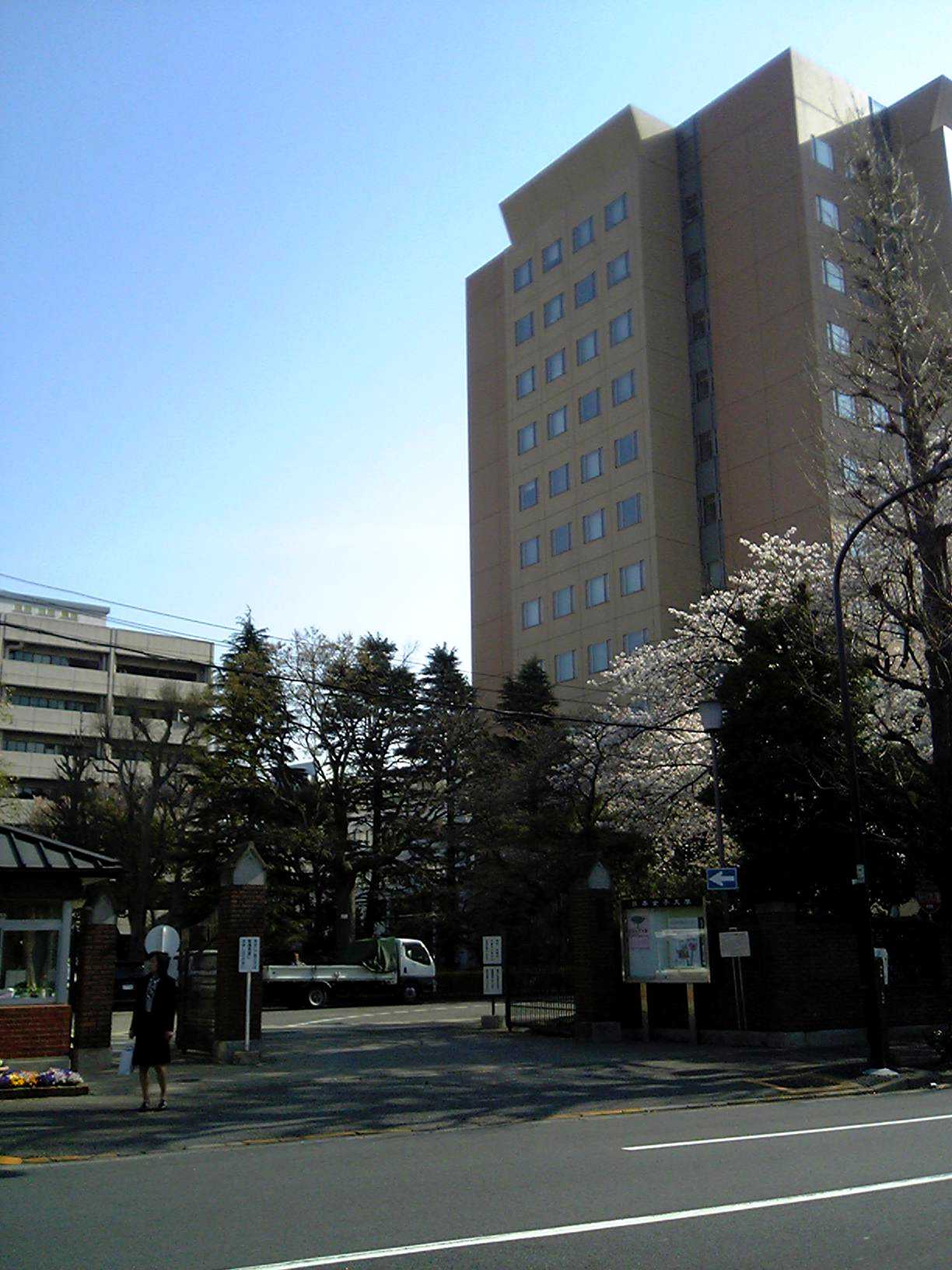
- A building of the Japan Women's University
- Type: Private
- Established: 1901
- Academic staff: 200 (approx.)
- Students: 6000 (approx.)
- Website: www.jwu.ac.jp

Japan Women's University (日本女子大学, Nihon joshi daigaku) is the oldest and largest of private Japanese women's universities. The university was established on 20 April 1901 by education reformist Jinzo Naruse.

The university has around 6000 students and 200 faculty. It has two campuses, named after the neighborhoods in which they are located: Mejirodai (目白台) in Bunkyō, Tokyo, and Nishi-Ikuta (西生田) in Tama, Kawasaki, Kanagawa Prefecture.

There are associated schools from kindergarten through senior high school.

== History ==
Japan Women's University was founded by educator Jinzo Naruse in 1901. Initially, the university comprised three departments: home economics, Japanese literature, and English literature.

== Faculty ==
- home economics
- humanities
- Integrated arts and social sciences
- sciences

== Notable alumnae ==
- Chikako Asō, daughter and wife of Prime Ministers of Japan
- Tsuruko Haraguchi, first Japanese woman to earn a doctorate in psychology
- Yumie Hiraiwa, novelist
- Raicho Hiratsuka
- Tano Jōdai, sixth president of Japan Women's University
- Hideko Inouye, first woman president of Japan Women's University
- Junko Izumi, kyōgen performer
- Shina Inoue Kan
- Tsuruyo Kondo, politician
- Tomi Kora, politician
- Keiko Matsui, jazz musician
- Ayame Mizushima, screenwriter
- Yuriko Miyamoto
- Kazuyo Sejima, architect
- Rumiko Takahashi, manga artist
- Toshiko Tamura
- Satoko Shinohara, president of Japan Women's University (2010–2020), professor, and architect

== Access ==
The closest train stations to the Mejiro Campus are:

- Tokyo Metro Fukutoshin Line: About 8 minutes by foot from Zoshigaya Station (exit 3)
- Tokyo Metro Yurakucho Line: About 10 minutes by foot from Gokokuji Station (exit 4)
